= Jon Øyvind Andersen =

Norwegian black metal guitarist

Jon Øyvind Andersen (born 29 July 1965), mostly known as Jardar, is a Norwegian black metal guitarist. He was one of the founding members of the band Old Man's Child, with Galder and Tjodalv. He has played on all the band's albums, except Ill-Natured Spiritual Invasion (1998), Vermin (2005) and Slaves of the World (2009), where Galder was the sole guitarist. Besides as a guitarist, Jardar has also contributed with backing vocals, and he was also co-writer on two songs on In Defiance of Existence.

In 2005 he formed the band Insidious Disease, together with Silenoz (guitarist of Dimmu Borgir), singer Marc Grewe (of Morgoth), bass player Shane Embury (from Napalm Death) and drummer Tony Laureano.

== Discography ==
=== With Old Man's Child ===
- In The Shades Of Life, Hot Records, 1994,
- Born of the Flickering, Hot Records, 1995
- The Pagan Prosperity, Century Media, 1997
- Revelation 666 - The Curse of Damnation, Century Media, 2000
- In Defiance of Existence, Century Media, 2003
