= The Historical Plague =

Box set by Old Man's Child
- Released: 8 December 2003
- Genre: Black metal
- Length: 3:23:18
- Label: Century Media Records

Old Man's Child chronology
In Defiance of Existence (2003)	The Historical Plague (2003)	Vermin (2005)

The Historical Plague is a collector's vinyl boxed set by the black metal band Old Man's Child, limited to 2000 copies. It was released on 8 December 2003 by Century Media Records. It contained remastered Gatefold Vinyl LP versions of the five Studio Albums that Old Man's Child had released up to 2003: Born of the Flickering (1996), The Pagan Prosperity (1997), Ill-Natured Spiritual Invasion (1998), Revelation 666 - The Curse of Damnation (2000) and In Defiance of Existence (2003).

== Track listing ==
1996 - Born of the Flickering

1. "Demons of the Thorncastle" – 4:47
2. "Swallowed by a Buried One" – 4:51
3. "Born of the Flickering" – 5:05
4. "King of the Dark Ages" – 5:27
5. "Wounds From the Night of Magic" – 3:28
6. "On Through the Desert Storm" – 4:20
7. "Christian Death" – 4:55
8. "Funeral, Swords and Souls" – 4:56
9. "The Last Chapter" – 4:42
10. "...Leads to Utopia/The Old Man's Dream" – 8:44

1997 - The Pagan Prosperity

1. "The Millennium King" – 5:28
2. "Behind the Mask" – 3:58
3. "Soul Possessed" – 4:04
4. "My Demonic Figures" – 3:59
5. "Doommaker" – 3:39
6. "My Kingdom Will Come" – 4:35
7. "Return of the Night Creatures" – 5:36
8. "What Malice Embrace" – 5:13

1998 - Ill-Natured Spiritual Invasion

1. "Towards Eternity" – 5:17
2. "The Dream Ghost" – 3:41
3. "Demoniacal Possession" – 3:31
4. "Fall of Man" – 4:00
5. "Captives of Humanity" – 4:42
6. "God of Impiety" – 5:23
7. "My Evil Revelations" – 3:59
8. "Thy Servant" – 4:46

2000 - Revelation 666 - The Curse of Damnation

1. "Phantoms of Mortem Tales" – 5:35
2. "Hominis Nocturna" – 5:22
3. "In Black Endless Void" – 4:27
4. "Unholy Vivid Innocence" – 5:06
5. "Passage to Pandemonium" – 4:13
6. "Obscure Divine Manifestation" – 4:20
7. "World Expiration" – 6:06
8. "Into Silence Embrace" – 5:02

2003 - In Defiance of Existence

1. "Felonies Of The Christian Art" – 5:48
2. "Agony Of Fallen Grace" – 4:28
3. "Black Seeds On Virgin Soil" – 4:57
4. "In Defiance Of Existence" – 4:56
5. "Sacrifice Of Vengeance" – 4:31
6. "The Soul Receiver" – 4:31
7. "In Quest Of Enigmatic Dreams" – 0:52
8. "The Underworld Domains" – 4:48
9. "Life Deprived" – 4:49

== Personnel ==
=== Additional personnel ===
- Christophe Szpajdel — logo
