= The Invaluable Darkness =

Video by Dimmu Borgir
- Released: 14 October 2008
- Genre: Symphonic black metal
- Length: 280:00
- Language: English; Norwegian
- Label: Nuclear Blast
- Producer: Dimmu Borgir

Dimmu Borgir chronology
In Sorte Diaboli (2007)	The Invaluable Darkness (2008)	Abrahadabra (2010)

The Invaluable Darkness is the second video album by Norwegian symphonic black metal band Dimmu Borgir, released on 14 October 2008. The title comes from the closing track of the band's eighth studio album, In Sorte Diaboli (2007), despite the fact that the track does not appear on this release.

== Track listing ==
=== DVD One: The Invaluable Darkness Tour – Europe 2007 ===
Sentrum Scene in Oslo, Norway – 6 November 2007:

1. Introduction
2. Progenies of the Great Apocalypse
3. The Serpentine Offering
4. The Chosen Legacy
5. Spellbound (By The Devil)
6. Sorgens Kammer Del II
7. The Insight And The Catharsis
8. Raabjørn Speiler Draugheimens Skodde
9. The Sacrilegious Scorn
10. Mourning Palace
11. The Fallen Arises

Columbiahalle in Berlin, Germany – 21 October 2007:

12. The Sinister Awakening
13. A Succubus In Rapture
14. Fear & Wonder
15. Blessings Upon the Throne of Tyranny

The Forum in London, UK – 28 September 2007:

16. Vredesbyrd
17. Puritania

II. Behind-The-Scenes Footage

III. Special Feature

=== DVD Two ===
I. Wacken Open Air, Germany – Black Metal Stage – 2 August 2007

1. Introduction
2. Progenies of the Great Apocalypse
3. Vredesbyrd
4. Cataclysm Children
5. Kings Of The Carnival Creation
6. Sorgens Kammer Del II
7. Indoctrination
8. A Succubus In Rapture
9. The Serpentine Offering
10. The Chosen Legacy
11. The Insight And The Catharsis
12. Spellbound (By The Devil)
13. Mourning Palace
14. The Fallen Arises

II. P3 Session – NRK Studio 19 IN Oslo, Norway – 18 September 2007

1. The Serpentine Offering
2. Spellbound (By The Devil)
3. Mourning Palace

III. Video Gallery

1. Progenies of the Great Apocalypse
2. Vredesbyrd
3. Sorgens Kammer Del II
4. The Serpentine Offering
5. The Sacrilegious Scorn
6. The Chosen Legacy

IV. Gold Awards Oslo

V. Image Gallery

=== Bonus Audio CD ===
P3 Session @ NRK Studio 19 in Oslo, Norway – 18 September 2007

1. Introduction
2. Progenies of the Great Apocalypse
3. Vredesbyrd
4. Sorgens Kammer Del II
5. Indoctrination
6. A Succubus In Rapture
7. The Serpentine Offering
8. The Chosen Legacy
9. The Insight And The Catharsis
10. Spellbound (By The Devil)
11. Mourning Palace
12. The Fallen Arises

== Line-up on this DVD ==
- Shagrath – lead vocals
- Silenoz – rhythm guitar, lead guitar in "Sorgens Kammer Del II"
- Galder – lead guitar
- ICS Vortex – bass guitar, clean vocals
- Mustis – keyboards, piano
- Tony Laureano – drums
