= Century Black discography =

- Arcturus
  - Aspera Hiems Symfonia
- Aura Noir
  - Black Thrash Attack
- Borknagar
  - Borknagar
  - The Olden Domain
- Dodheimsgard
  - Kronet Til Konge
  - Monumental Possession
- Einherjer
  - Odin Owns Ye All
- Emperor
  - Wrath of the Tyrant
  - In the Nightside Eclipse
  - Anthems to the Welkin at Dusk
- Gorgoroth
  - Pentagram
  - Antichrist
  - Under the Sign of Hell
- Kampfar
  - Mellom Skogkledde Aaser
- Katatonia
  - Dance of December Souls
  - Brave Murder Day
  - Discouraged Ones
- Mayhem
  - Live in Leipzig
  - De Mysteriis Dom Sathanas
- Old Man's Child
  - Born of the Flickering
  - The Pagan Prosperity
  - Ill-Natured Spiritual Invasion
- Opeth
  - Orchid
  - Morningrise
  - My Arms, Your Hearse
- Ophthalamia
  - Via Dolorosa
- Rotting Christ
  - Thy Mighty Contract
  - Triarchy of Lost Lovers
  - A Dead Poem
- Sacramentum
  - The Coming of Chaos
- Satyricon
  - Nemesis Divina
- Ulver
  - Nattens Madrigal
