= World Misanthropy =

Video album by Dimmu Borgir
- Released: 28 May 2002
- Genre: Symphonic black metal
- Length: DVDs: 140:00 approx. CD: 33:51
- Label: Nuclear Blast
- Producer: Dimmu Borgir

Dimmu Borgir chronology
Alive in Torment (2002)	World Misanthropy (2002)	Death Cult Armageddon (2003)

Professional ratings
Review scores
Source	Rating
AllMusic	4.5/5 stars

World Misanthropy is the first video album by Norwegian symphonic black metal band Dimmu Borgir. It was released on 28 May 2002 as a two disc set, with early pressings featuring the bonus CD, a VHS and the bonus disc separately as a limited edition clear 12" vinyl with white and green streaked spots with only 2000 copies pressed. The first disc was filmed during the tour to support the band's fifth studio album Puritanical Euphoric Misanthropia, while the second disc is a compilation of videos from previous tours and other media.

== Track listing ==
DVD 1
No.	Title	Length
1.	"Blessings Upon the Throne of Tyranny" (Wacken, 2001)	5:22
2.	"The Blazing Monoliths of Defiance" (Stuttgart, 4 April 2001)	4:44
3.	"IndoctriNation" (Wacken, 2001)	6:10
4.	"The Insight and the Catharsis" (Stuttgart, 4 April 2001)	7:08
5.	"Puritania" (Wacken 2001)	3:06
6.	"Tormentor of Christian Souls" (Stuttgart, 4 April 2001)	5:30
7.	"Kings of the Carnival Creation" (Wacken, 2001)	7:57
8.	"The Maelstrom Mephisto" (Stuttgart, 4 April 2001)	4:45
9.	"Backstage Footage And Home Videos"

DVD 2
No.	Title	Length
1.	"Stormblast" (Kraków, Poland, 1998)	4:34
2.	"Entrance" (Kraków, Poland, 1998)	4:17
3.	"Hunnerkongens Sorgsvarte Ferd Over Steppene" (Kraków, Poland, 1998)	2:57
4.	"Alt Lys Er Svunnet Hen" (1995)	4:38
5.	"Spellbound (By the Devil)" (1997)	4:05
6.	"Arcane Lifeforce Mysteria" (1999)	6:58
7.	"Puritania" (2001)	3:06
8.	"Photogalleries: Official Press Pictures; Live Pictures (Tourdates 1. Pic); Backstage & Friends; P.E.M Orchestra Studio Session; Available Dimmu Borgir Merchandise"	—

Bonus CD
No.	Title	Length
1.	"Masses for the New Messiah"	5:11
2.	"Devil's Path" (Re-recorded version of the one found on their 1996 EP.)	6:05
3.	"Blessings upon the Throne of Tyranny" (Wacken, 2001)	5:22
4.	"Kings of the Carnival Creation" (Wacken, 2001)	7:57
5.	"Puritania" (Wacken 2001)	3:06
6.	"IndoctriNation" (Wacken 2001)	6:10

== Personnel ==
=== DVD 1 / Bonus CD ===
==== Dimmu Borgir ====
- Shagrath – lead vocals
- Silenoz – rhythm guitar
- Galder – lead guitar
- Nicholas Barker – drums
- ICS Vortex – bass, clean vocals
- Mustis – synthesizers, piano

==== Guest (Bonus CD) ====
- Andy LaRocque – guitar solo on "Devil's Path" (Re-recorded version)

=== DVD 2 ===
- Shagrath - lead vocals (tracks 1–3, 5–7), lead guitar (tracks 4, 5)
- Silenoz - lead vocals (track 4), rhythm guitar
- Astennu - lead guitar (tracks 1–3, 6)
- Galder - lead guitar (track 7)
- Nagash - bass, backing vocals (tracks 1–3, 5, 6)
- ICS Vortex - bass (track 7), clean vocals (track 6)
- Brynjard Tristan - bass (track 4)
- Tjodalv - drums (tracks 1–6)
- Nick Barker - drums (track 7)
- Stian Aarstad - keyboards (tracks 4, 5)
- Mustis - keyboards (tracks 1–3, 6, 7)
