= Strid (band) =

Norwegian black metal band

- Also known as: Malfeitor; Battle
- Origin: Askim, Norway
- Genres: Depressive black metal
- Years active: 1991–1994, 1997–?, 2009–2015, 2019-present
- Labels: Malicious Records; Kyrck Productions & Armour; Lupus Lounge
- Members: Yusaf "Vicotnik" Parvez; Ravn Harjar; Sigmund Hansen; Svein Egil Hatlevik; Christian "Clandestine" Eidskrem
- Past members: Espen "Storm" Andersen; Jardar; Lars Fredrik Bergstrøm

Strid is a Norwegian black metal band. The group formed in 1991 as Malfeitor, and changed their name to Battle by 1992 before eventually settling on their current name the year following. Despite Strid's small discography and limited number of recordings, it has acquired a dedicated cult following and is commonly recognized as a major pioneer within the depressive black metal scene.

== History ==
After releasing two demos, "Malfeitor" in 1991 and "Pandemonium" in 1992, Malfeitor changed its name to Battle and underwent several lineup changes. In 1992, Battle recorded its demo "End of Life," which contained only one song and spanned roughly 11 minutes. Its lineup then consisted of Espen 'Storm' Andersen on bass and vocals, Lars Fredrik Bergstrøm on guitars, and Jardar on drums. The band again renamed itself in 1993 to Strid, Norwegian for "strife." That year, Strid released "End of Life" under its new name through the German label "Malicious Records". Lars Fredrik Bergstrøm departed afterward and was replaced by Ravn Harjar. From 1993 to 1994, the band wrote and recorded a self-titled EP, which was released through Malicious Records and contained only two songs: "Det hviskes blant sorte vinder" (Note: "It is whispered amid the black winds" in Norwegian.) and "Nattevandring." (Note: "Night-wandering" in Norwegian.) This demo featured a more ambient sound, earning the band recognition as one of depressive black metal's first pioneers.

Since then, the band released no more official records until 2007, but numerous bootlegs of the band's material were released by publishers such as Ars Mysteriorum in a CD and LP in 2005, each featuring tracks from both "End of Life" and the eponymous EP. Founding member Espen 'Storm' Andersen committed suicide in 2001. Strid officially re-released all of its old material, including that which it released as Malfeitor, in a second eponymous record through Greek label Kyrck Productions & Armour in 2007. The band reunited at some point between 2009 and 2010, featuring Vicotnik (Dødheimsgard, ex-Aphrodisiac, ex-Ved Buens Ende, ex-Manes, ex-Code, ex-Naer Mataron, ex-Endwarfment) and Lars Fredrik Bergstrøm (the main composer of the "End of Life" track). Bergstrøm died in 2014 - by then the band was composed of Ravn Harjar on guitars and vocals, Vicotnik on bass, and Sigmund (ex-Inflabitan, ex-Dødheimsgard) on guitars. Citing Bergstrøm's death and internal conflict, Harjar announced the dissolution of Strid on its official facebook page in January 2015. (Note: The page was still active as of October 2017.)

== Members ==
=== Current lineup ===
- Yusaf "Vicotnik" Parvez – bass, guitars, vocals (2009–2015, 2019–present)
- Edvard Andre "Ravn Harjar" Hauge Rødseth – guitars, vocals (1991–1994, 1997–?, 2009–2015, 2019–present)
- Sigmund Hansen - guitars (2014–2015, 2019–present)
- Svein Egil Hatlevik - drums (2019–present)
- Christian "Clandestine" Eidskrem - guitars, bass (2019–present)

=== Former members ===
- Espen "Storm" Andersen (deceased 2001) – bass, vocals, keyboards (1991–1994, 1997–?)
- Kenneth "Jardar" Søimer Haugen (Note: Not to be confused with Old Man's Child's former guitarist, Jon Øyvind Andersen.) – drums (1991–1993)
- Lars Fredrik Bergstrøm (deceased 2014) – guitars (1991–1994, 1997–?, 2009–2014)

== Discography ==
- Malfeitor (1991, self-released, demo)
- Pandemonium (1992, self-released, demo)
- End of Life (1993, self-released, demo)
- Strid (1994, Malicious Records, EP)
- Strid (2007, Kyrck Productions & Armour, compilation)
