= Vermin (album) =

Studio album by Old Man's Child
- Released: 14 October 2005
- Recorded: Jan–Feb 2005
- Genre: Symphonic black metal
- Length: 37:32
- Label: Century Media
- Producer: Galder

Old Man's Child chronology
| The Historical Plague (2003) | Vermin (2005) | Slaves of the World (2009) |

Professional ratings
Review scores
| Source | Rating |
|---|---|
| Allmusic | 3/5 stars |

Vermin is the sixth studio album by Norwegian black metal band Old Man's Child, released on 14 October 2005.

== Track listing ==
All music and lyrics written and composed by Galder, except "Twilight Damnation" (music by Galder and Jardar, lyrics by Galder).

1. "Enslaved and Condemned" – 4:15
2. "The Plague of Sorrow" – 4:09
3. "War of Fidelity" – 4:19
4. "In Torment's Orbit" – 5:04
5. "Lord of Command (Bringer of Hate)" – 4:51
6. "The Flames of Deceit" – 4:39
7. "Black Marvels of Death" – 4:22
8. "Twilight Damnation" – 4:42
9. "...As Evil Descends" – 1:11

== Credits ==
- Galder – vocals, lead guitars, bass guitar, acoustic guitars, and keyboards
- Reno Kiilerich – drums (session)
- Eric Peterson – guest guitar lead on "In Torment's Orbit"

=== Additional personnel ===
- Christophe Szpajdel — logo
