= The Sacrilegious Scorn =

Single by Dimmu Borgir

from the album In Sorte Diaboli
- Released: 2007
- Genre: Symphonic black metal
- Length: 3:53
- Label: Nuclear Blast
- Songwriters: Shagrath, Silenoz and Galder.

Dimmu Borgir singles chronology
"'"The Serpentine Offering"'" (2007)	"The Sacrilegious Scorn" (2007)	"'"Gateways"'" (2010)

"The Sacrilegious Scorn" is the second promotional single by Norwegian symphonic black metal band Dimmu Borgir from the 2007 album In Sorte Diaboli.

== Music video ==
The video for "The Sacrilegious Scorn" was directed by Joachim Luetke, who explains the concept and symbolism behind the song as follows:

The Sacrilegious Scorn" is mainly a paraphrase of Christianity's core symbolism and motives.

Such examples are the Roman soldiers gambling over Christ's garment, the mockery of St. Michael the Archangel, driving Satan out of Heaven by stepping on him and pointing his sword onto him. Now we see this reversed, when the inaugurated Antichrist is doing that to St. Michael.

We also witness the inauguration of the Antichrist in the Temple of the Baphomet, seeing him taking the oath as the new sovereign while celebrating a mockery of the Last Supper. The story culminates in the Antichrist showing up in front of his followers, bringing out blessings. The Empire of Darkness is then established.

The overall look of the video is a bow to the legendary, unique style of Roger Corman, especially his adaptation of The Masque of the Red Death, featuring the unforgettable Vincent Price.

This lifts the clip to an additional meta-level: The mockery of using an early 60s technique to visualize "The Sacrilegious Scorn" for a present-day audience.
