= In Defiance of Existence =

Studio album by Old Man's Child
- Released: 20 January 2003
- Recorded: April–July 2002
- Genre: Symphonic black metal
- Length: 39:46
- Label: Century Media
- Producer: Galder; Fredrik Nordström

Old Man's Child chronology
Revelation 666 – The Curse of Damnation (2000)	In Defiance of Existence (2003)	The Historical Plague (2003)

Professional ratings
Review scores
Source	Rating
AllMusic	4/5 stars
Rock Hard	6/10

In Defiance of Existence is the fifth studio album by Norwegian black metal band Old Man's Child, released on 20 January 2003.

== Track listing ==
All music and lyrics written and composed by Galder, except on tracks 4 & 7 music by Galder/Jardar.

1. "Felonies of the Christian Art" – 5:48
2. "Agony of Fallen Grace" – 4:28
3. "Black Seeds on Virgin Soil" – 4:57
4. "In Defiance of Existence" – 4:56
5. "Sacrifice of Vengeance" – 4:31
6. "The Soul Receiver" – 4:31
7. "In Quest of Enigmatic Dreams" – 0:52
8. "The Underworld Domains" – 4:48
9. "Life Deprived" – 4:49

== Personnel ==
- Galder – vocals, guitars, bass and synth
- Jardar – guitars
- Nick Barker – drums
- Gus G – guest guitar solos on tracks 1 and 9

Additional personnel

- Christophe Szpajdel — logo
