= Cyrus (musician) =

Norwegian musician

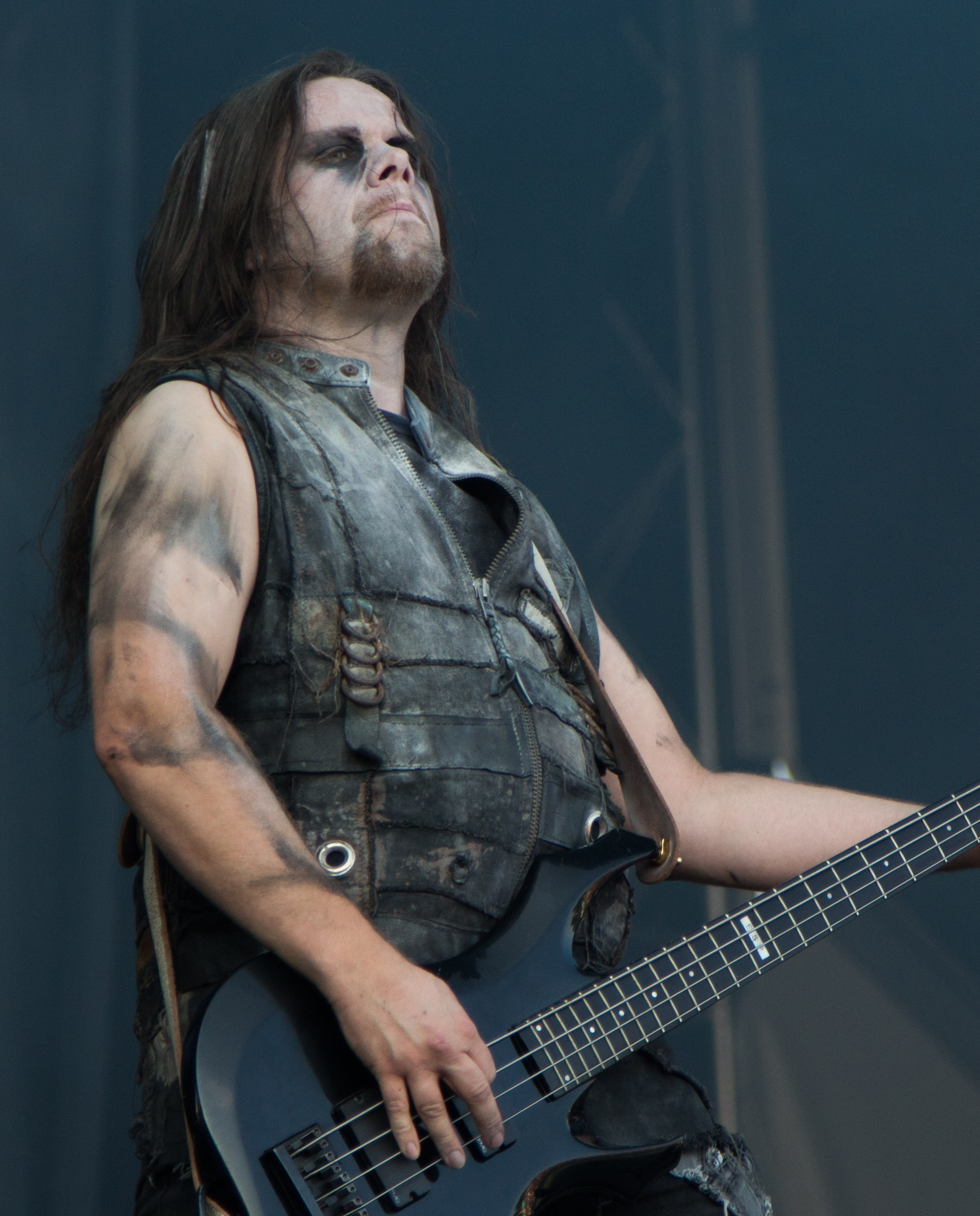
- Cyrus with Dimmu Borgir in 2014

Background information
- Born: Terje Andersen; 12 May 1975 (age 50); Akershus, Norway
- Genres: Symphonic black metal, black metal, heavy metal, thrash metal
- Occupation: Musician
- Instrument(s): Guitar, bass
- Years active: 1998–present

Terje Andersen (born 12 May 1975), known professionally as Cyrus, is a Norwegian musician best known as the guitarist of the thrash metal band Susperia and as former touring bassist of Dimmu Borgir.

== Biography ==
Cyrus started his career in 1997 when he went playing in a band called Seven Sins with ex-Dimmu Borgir drummer Tjodalv. The band released one demo tape in that period. In 1999, they changed name to Susperia.

In 2000, Cyrus went playing guitar with Satyricon for a worldwide tour. He was in Satyricon for two years as session member. In 2009, he became a session guitarist of thrash/black metal band Sarke. In 2011, with Susperia he released first Susperia's single "Nothing Remains".

Cyrus recently played guitar in Susperia (as full-time member) and Sarke (as session member) and bass guitar in Dimmu Borgir (as session member).

== Discography ==
=== With Susperia ===
- Illusions of Evil (Demo, 2000)
- Predominance (Nuclear Blast, 2001)
- Vindication (Nuclear Blast, 2002)
- Unlimited (Tabu, 2004)
- Devil May Care (EP, Tabu, 2005)
- Cut From Stone (Tabu, 2007)
- Attitude (Candlelight Records, 2009)
- Nothing Remains (Single, NRK/MGP, 2011)
- The Lyricist (Agonia, 2018)

=== With Dimmu Borgir ===
- Forces of the Northern Night (2012)

=== With ICS Vortex ===
- Storm Seeker (2011)

=== With Sarke ===
- Oldarhian (2011)
