= Booze, Broads and Beelzebub =

Studio album by Chrome Division
- Released: 18 July 2008
- Recorded: 7–15 January 2008
- Studio: Studio Fredman, Gothenburg
- Genre: Biker metal, hard rock
- Length: 50:22
- Label: Nuclear Blast
- Producer: Chrome Division

Chrome Division chronology
Doomsday Rock 'n Roll (2006)	Booze, Broads and Beelzebub (2008)	3rd Round Knockout (2011)

Professional ratings
Review scores
Source	Rating
AllMusic	3/5 stars
Jukebox:Metal	5/5 stars
Kerrang!	3/5 stars

Booze, Broads and Beelzebub is the second studio album by Norwegian rock band Chrome Division. It was released on 18 July 2008 through Nuclear Blast.

The band announced that they had finished recording the album on 15 January 2008 on their MySpace blog, and announced the title and the planned release date on 14 May 2008, which was picked up on by heavy metal news sources. The album took seven days to record at Studio Fredman in Gothenburg, starting on 7 January 2008. Before either of the blog announcements, bassist Björn Luna said in an interview that Chrome Division's next album would be released on Nuclear Blast, explaining that the band have a three-album contract with the label, and Blabbermouth.net confirmed that the album would be released on Nuclear Blast.

== Track listing ==
All tracks written by Chrome Division, except where noted.

1. "The Second Coming" – 1:02
2. "Booze, Broads and Beelzebub" – 4:20
3. "Wine of Sin" – 4:10
4. "Raven Black Cadillac" – 4:22
5. "Life of a Fighter" – 4:38
6. "The Devil Walks Proud" – 3:50
7. "Hate This Town" – 3:55
8. "The Boys from the East" – 4:47
9. "Doomsday Rider" – 3:46
10. "Let's Hear It" – 4:55
11. "Sharp Dressed Man" (ZZ Top cover) – 3:10 (ZZ Top)
12. "Bad Broad (Good Girl Gone Bad)" – 4:12
13. "Raise Your Flag" – 3:00

== Personnel ==
- Shagrath – guitars
- Eddie Guz – vocals
- Ricky Black – guitars
- Luna – bass
- Tony White – drums

Production

- Arranged and produced by Chrome Division
- Recorded and engineered by Fredrik Nordström; assistant engineers: Henrik Udd and Ricky Black
- Mixed by Shagrath, Fredrik Nordstrom and Henrik Udd
- Mastered by Peter in de Betou
