= Doomsday Rock 'n Roll =

Studio album by Chrome Division
- Released: 21 July 2006
- Recorded: December 2005 – March 2006
- Studio: Panzer Studio, Oslo
- Genre: Biker metal, hard rock
- Length: 46:03
- Label: Nuclear Blast
- Producer: Bjorn Bergersen

Chrome Division chronology
Doomsday Rock 'n Roll (2006)	Booze, Broads and Beelzebub (2008)

Professional ratings
Review scores
Source	Rating
Degeneracion Rock	4/5 stars

Doomsday Rock 'n Roll is an album by Norwegian rock band Chrome Division. It reached #31 on the Norwegian albums chart.

== Track listing ==
1. "Doomsday Overture" – 1:30
2. "Serial Killer" – 3:46
3. "Hate" – 3:50
4. "Trouble with the Law" – 4:44
5. "Chrome Division" – 3:50
6. "Here Comes Another One" – 3:04
7. "1st Regiment" – 5:25
8. "Breathe Easy" – 3:46
9. "The Angel Falls" – 4:16
10. "Till the Break of Dawn" – 3:30
11. "We Want More" – 6:17
12. "When the Shit Hits the Fan" – 2:08

== Credits ==
- Shagrath – rhythm guitar
- Ricky Black – lead guitar
- Björn Luna – bass guitar
- Tony White – drums
- Eddie Guz – vocals
