= Revelation 666 – The Curse of Damnation =

Revelation 666: the Curse of Damnation

Studio album by Old Man's Child
- Released: 13 March 2000
- Recorded: November 1999
- Genre: Symphonic black metal
- Length: 40:09
- Label: Century Media
- Producer: Galder and Peter Tägtgren

Old Man's Child chronology
Ill-Natured Spiritual Invasion (1998)	Revelation 666: the Curse of Damnation (2000)	In Defiance of Existence (2003)

Professional ratings
Review scores
Source	Rating
Allmusic	3/5 stars

Revelation 666: the Curse of Damnation is the fourth studio album by Norwegian black metal band Old Man's Child, released on 13 March 2000.

== Track listing ==
All music and arrangements by Galder. Lyrics by Old Man's Child.

1. "Phantoms of Mortem Tales" – 5:35
2. "Hominis Nocturna" – 5:22
3. "In Black Endless Void" – 4:27
4. "Unholy Vivid Innocence" – 5:06
5. "Passage to Pandemonium" – 4:13
6. "Obscure Divine Manifestation" – 4:20
7. "World Expiration" – 6:06
8. "Into Silence Embrace" – 5:02

== Credits ==
- Galder – vocals, guitar, and synths
- Jardar – guitars
- Memnoch – bass
- Tjodalv – drums on tracks 2, 3, 5 and 7
- Grimar – drums on track 1, 4, 6 and 8
- Marielle Andersen – additional vocals on track 4

=== Additional personnel ===
- Christophe Szpajdel — logo
