= List of biker metal bands =

This is a list of biker metal bands. Biker metal is a fusion genre of punk rock, heavy metal, rock and roll, and blues.

== List ==
- The Almighty
- Anti-Nowhere League
- Black Label Society
- Black Moth
- Chrome Division
- Girlschool
- The Godz
- The Gone Jackals
- Earthride
- High Rise
- Iggy Pop
- Kïll Cheerleadër
- Kylesa
- Loudmouth
- Malignant Tumour
- Metallica
- Motörhead
- The Obsessed
- Orange Goblin
- Plasmatics
- Axel Rudi Pell
- Rogue Male
- Saxon
- Sea Hags
- Spread Eagle
- Steve Jones
- Tank
- Turbonegro
- Tygers of Pan Tang
- Zodiac Mindwarp and the Love Reaction
