= Cut from Stone =

Studio album by Susperia
- Released: 2 April 2007
- Recorded: August–October 2006
- Genre: Thrash metal
- Length: 47:07
- Label: Tabu Recordings
- Producer: Susperia & Marius Strand

Susperia chronology
Unlimited (2004)	Cut from Stone (2007)	Attitude (2009)

Professional ratings
Review scores
Source	Rating
AllMusic	3.5/5 stars

Cut from Stone is the fourth studio album by the Norwegian thrash metal band Susperia. As with their other albums, there is an extreme Testament influence in their music.

== Track listing ==
All lyrics are written by Pål "Athera" Mathiesen

No.	Title	Music	Length
1.	"More"	Terje "Cyrus" Andersen	3:33
2.	"Lackluster Day"	Cyrus	3:22
3.	"The Clone"	Cyrus	4:14
4.	"Distant Memory"	Cyrus, Christian "Elvorn" Hagen	6:55
5.	"Release"	Cyrus	4:44
6.	"Life Deprived"	Cyrus	4:23
7.	"Between the Lines"	Cyrus, Elvorn	3:35
8.	"Bound to Come"	Cyrus	3:45
9.	"Under"	Cyrus	4:09
10.	"Brother"	Cyrus	3:16
11.	"Cut from Stone"	Cyrus	5:11

== Credits ==
Susperia

- Athera – vocals
- Cyrus – lead guitar
- Elvorn (Christian Hagen) – rhythm guitar
- Memnock – bass
- Tjodalv – drums

Production

- Rune Tyvold – cover art

== Release history ==
Country	Date
Norway	2 April 2007
Europe	9 April 2007
