= Unlimited (Susperia album) =

Studio album by Susperia
- Released: 29 June 2004
- Recorded: October–December 2003
- Genre: Thrash metal
- Length: 45:35
- Label: Tabu Recordings
- Producer: Susperia

Susperia chronology
Vindication (2002)	Unlimited (2004)	Cut from Stone (2007)

Professional ratings
Review scores
Source	Rating
chroniclesofchaos.com	8.5/10 stars

Unlimited is the third studio album by the Norwegian thrash metal band Susperia, released in 2004. Reviews specifically noted them as sounding like Testament.

== Track listing ==
No.	Title	Lyrics	Music	Length
1.	"Chemistry"	Athera	Cyrus, Tjodalv, Memnock	4:34
2.	"The Coming Past"	Athera	Cyrus	3:42
3.	"Situational Awareness"	Athera	Cyrus	4:41
4.	"Devil May Care"	Athera, Memnock	Elvorn, Cyrus	5:50
5.	"Off the Grid"	Athera	Cyrus, Tjodalv	4:24
6.	"Years of Infinity"	Athera	Cyrus, Memnock	4:46
7.	"Home Sweet Hell"	Athera	Athera, Cyrus, Tjodalv	4:44
8.	"Mind Apart"	Athera	Cyrus	4:17
9.	"Beast by Design"	Athera	Cyrus	4:03
10.	"Untouched"	Athera	Cyrus	4:34

== Personnel ==
- Athera – vocals
- Cyrus – lead and rhythm guitar
- Elvorn – rhythm guitar
- Memnock – bass
- Tjodalv – drums
