= Pål Mathiesen =

Norwegian singer (born 1977)

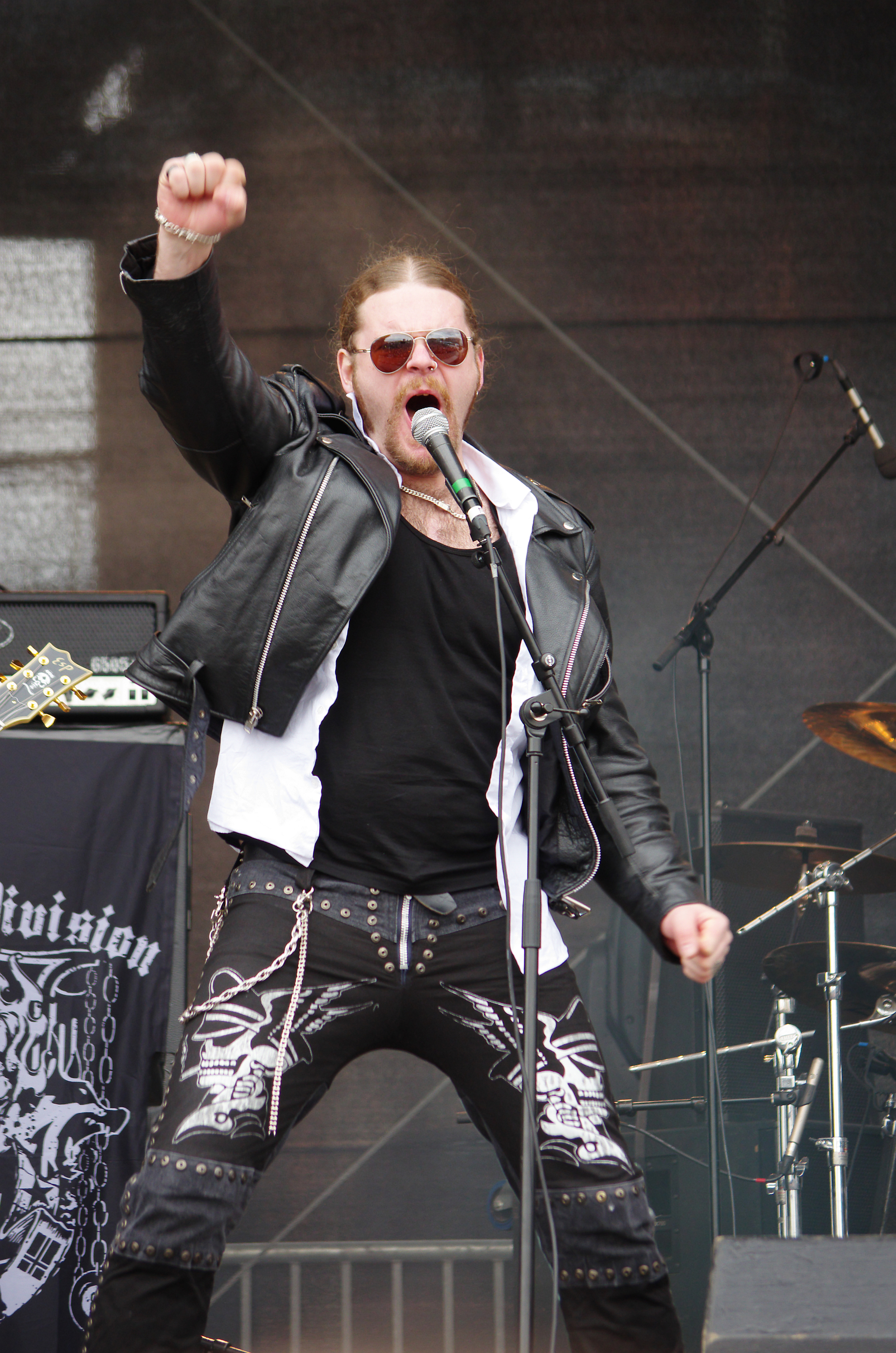
- Mathiesen in 2013

Background information
- Also known as: Athera; Shady Blue; Daukjött
- Born: 14 August 1977 (age 48)
- Genres: Heavy metal; thrash metal; melodic black metal; viking metal
- Occupation: Singer
- Member of: Minas
- Formerly of: Susperia; Vanaheim; Chrome Division

Pål Mathiesen (born on 14 August 1977), also known under the stage names Athera and Shady Blue, is a Norwegian singer, best known as the former lead vocalist of the black/thrash metal band Susperia. He is also the former lead vocalist of Chrome Division and a session live vocalist in Borknagar.

In 2009, Athera suffered a heart attack which resulted in major open-heart surgery.

== Discography ==
=== Vanaheim ===
- En Historie (1997)
- Helter og Kongers Fall (1998)

=== Susperia ===
- Illusions of Evil (demo, 2000)
- Predominance (Nuclear Blast, 2000)
- Vindication (Nuclear Blast, 2002)
- Unlimited (Tabu, 2004)
- Devil May Care (EP, Tabu, 2005)
- Cut from Stone (Tabu, 2007)
- Attitude (Candlelight Records, 2009)

=== Chrome Division ===
- Third Round Knockout (Nuclear Blast, 2011)
- Infernal Rock Eternal (2014)
