= In Sorte Diaboli =

- Cover art by Joachim Luetke

Studio album by Dimmu Borgir
- Released: 23 April 2007
- Recorded: October–December 2006
- Studio: Studio Fredman, Gothenburg, Sweden
- Genre: Symphonic black metal
- Length: 47:26
- Label: Nuclear Blast
- Producer: Dimmu Borgir, Fredrik Nordström

Dimmu Borgir chronology
Stormblåst MMV (2005)	In Sorte Diaboli (2007)	The Invaluable Darkness (2008)

Singles from In Sorte Diaboli
- 1. "The Serpentine Offering" Released: 30 March 2007; 2. "The Sacrilegious Scorn" Released: 2007

Professional ratings
Review scores
Source	Rating
About.com	4/5 stars
AllMusic	3/5 stars
Blabbermouth	9.5/10
Chronicles of Chaos	8/10
Kerrang!	4/5 stars
Metal Hammer (GER)	6/7
Verdens Gang	6/6

In Sorte Diaboli (Latin for "In league with the devil") is the seventh studio album by Norwegian symphonic black metal band Dimmu Borgir, released in 2007. It is the band's first concept album. A site on the Nuclear Blast website was created for In Sorte Diaboli, in which a new promotional photo can be seen and an audio sample can be heard. This would be the last album by Dimmu Borgir to feature ICS Vortex, Hellhammer and Mustis.

== Concept ==
In Sorte Diaboli is the band's first concept album, with a story located in medieval Europe. It is about a priest who begins to doubt his faith, and then ends up taking the place of the Antichrist. "There's this dude that works as a priest's assistant, and after a while he just discovers that he has nothing to do with Christianity", Silenoz says. "He just sort of has this awakening and realizes that he has different abilities and different powers and is leaning more to the dark side." The words "In Sorte Diaboli" are a repeated line in the song "The Chosen Legacy" and the words also appears towards the end of the song, "The Sinister Awakening". The conclusion of the story in the booklet implies that the story of In Sorte Diaboli is not yet finished. This remains to be seen, as their next album, Abrahadabra, is heavily influenced by Aleister Crowley's Thelema text The Book of the Law. IGN named the album the Top Metal Album of 2007.

== Critical reception ==
In Sorte Diaboli received generally positive critical reception. AllMusic praised the music, saying "[T]here's really great stuff here in the music, the production, in the sound effects". However they criticised the concept and lyrics of the album, writing "Too bad it all melts down when it comes to the concept, which is ho hum at best". About.com was more positive and wrote that "[T]he songs are orchestral and melodic, but still plenty of punch and darkness".

The album cover was rated by LA Weekly 9 out of 25 from their article "The 25 Creepiest Heavy Metal Album Covers".

== Sales performance ==
In their native Norway, the album peaked at number 1, which marks the first time in history of a black metal band reaching the number 1 spot. The album sold approximately 14,000 copies in its first week. The album also sold well in Sweden, Finland, Austria and Switzerland. It reached No. 43 in the US Billboard 200 chart, the first Norwegian band to break the U.S. Top 50 since A-ha. In Sorte Diaboli was disqualified twice by The Official UK Charts Company. The first disqualification was for the inclusion of a mirror inside the Digipack; the second was because the album included a flyer promoting a "meet the band" competition.

== Special editions ==
- The album was specially released in a limited edition digipak that contains a bonus DVD, 32-page booklet, and mirrored lyrics. The European limited digipak and the mail order leather-bound book editions come with a plastic mirror with which one can properly read the lyrics. The North American limited edition does not contain this mirror. The DVD contains the video clip for "The Serpentine Offering", two short "making of" documentaries for both the album and the video, a photogallery, and a media player.
- The limited-edition European digipak features the bonus track "The Ancestral Fever" as the fourth track.
- The limited-edition North American digipak features the bonus track "The Heretic Hammer" as the sixth track.
- The limited-edition Japanese digipak features the bonus track "Black Metal", a cover of the classic Venom track, as the tenth track.
- A very limited exclusive mail order edition, which features a leather booklet, was also released. This version also contains the two bonus tracks from the North American and European digipak versions.
- The vinyl edition is a gatefold LP packaged with a bonus 7", which also contains both the European and the North American Bonus track, and is limited to 2000 copies worldwide.
- The artwork is censored by a slipcase cover in North America.

== Track listing ==
- All music by Shagrath, Silenoz and Galder. All lyrics by Silenoz.

No.	Title	Length
1.	"The Serpentine Offering"	5:09
2.	"The Chosen Legacy"	4:16
3.	"The Conspiracy Unfolds"	5:24
4.	"The Sacrilegious Scorn"	3:58
5.	"The Fallen Arises" (Instrumental)	2:59
6.	"The Sinister Awakening"	5:09
7.	"The Fundamental Alienation"	5:17
8.	"The Invaluable Darkness"	4:44
9.	"The Foreshadowing Furnace"	5:50

Vinyl Edition with bonus 7"
No.	Title	Length
1.	"The Ancestral Fever"	5:51
2.	"The Heretic Hammer"	5:09

Digibook Edition
No.	Title	Length
1.	"The Serpentine Offering"	5:09
2.	"The Chosen Legacy"	4:16
3.	"The Conspiracy Unfolds"	5:24
4.	"The Ancestral Fever" (exclusive European Bonus Track)	5:51
5.	"The Sacrilegious Scorn"	3:58
6.	"The Fallen Arises" (Instrumental)	2:59
7.	"The Sinister Awakening"	5:09
8.	"The Fundamental Alienation"	5:17
9.	"The Invaluable Darkness"	4:44
10.	"The Foreshadowing Furnace"	5:50

Digibook Edition bonus DVD
No.	Title	Length
1.	"The Serpentine Offering" (video)	4:54
2.	"Making of the Album with Dimmu Borgir" (Studio Report)
3.	"Making Of "The Serpentine Offering" video with Dimmu Borgir"
4.	"Photogallery"

Leather Book Edition
No.	Title	Length
1.	"The Serpentine Offering"	5:09
2.	"The Chosen Legacy"	4:16
3.	"The Conspiracy Unfolds"	5:24
4.	"The Ancestral Fever" (exclusive European Bonus Track)	5:51
5.	"The Sacrilegious Scorn"	3:58
6.	"The Fallen Arises" (Instrumental)	2:59
7.	"The Heretic Hammer" (exclusive Bonus Track for this Mailorder Edition)	4:37
8.	"The Sinister Awakening"	5:09
9.	"The Fundamental Alienation"	5:17
10.	"The Invaluable Darkness"	4:44
11.	"The Foreshadowing Furnace"	5:50

Leather Book Edition bonus disk
No.	Title	Length
1.	"Black Metal" (Venom cover)	3:22
2.	"The Heretic Hammer"	4:37
3.	"The Ancestral Fever"	5:51
4.	"The Serpentine Offering" (video)	4:54

== Personnel ==
Dimmu Borgir

- Shagrath – lead vocals
- Silenoz – rhythm guitar, liner story
- Galder – lead guitar
- Mustis – synthesizers
- I.C.S. Vortex – bass, clean vocals on tracks 1, 4 & 10
- Hellhammer – drums

Technical

- Fredrik Nordström - Mixing, engineering
- Patrik J. Sten - assistant engineering
- Joachim Luetke - cover concept and artwork
- Patric Ullaeus - photography

== Charts ==
Region	Chart (2007)	Peak position
Norway	VG-lista	1
United States	Billboard 200	43
United States	Billboard Top Independent Albums	2
