= Nick Barker (drummer) =

British drummer

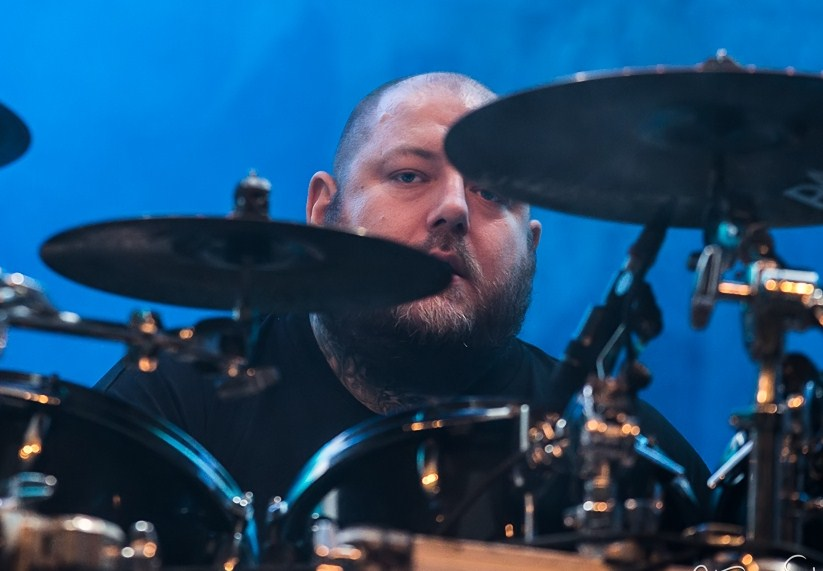
- Barker in 2013

Background information
- Born: Nicholas Howard Barker; 25 April 1973 (age 53); Chesterfield, England
- Genres: Black metal; thrash metal; death metal; grindcore
- Occupation: Drummer
- Years active: 1990–2023

Nicholas Howard Barker (born 1973) is an English extreme metal drummer best known for his work in Cradle of Filth from 1993 to 1999, Dimmu Borgir from 1999 to 2004, Brujeria from 2003 to 2005 and from 2016 to 2022, and Shining from 2022 to 2023. Currently he is the drummer for Borstal, Liquid Graveyard, Twilight of the Gods, and United Forces.

== Biography ==
Barker was born on 25 April 1973. His career started as a touring drum tech for Cancer, for whom he filled in on drums at live shows when Carl Stokes suffered an injury in 1993.

He joined Cradle of Filth as a full-time member later in 1993 replacing Was Sarginson and playing on the first four albums. After leaving in 1999, he joined Norwegian symphonic black metal band Dimmu Borgir. After being removed from the line-up, Barker went on to play with Brujeria, Old Man's Child, Lock Up, Gaahl and King ov Hell, Ancient, Atrocity, Leaves' Eyes. In 2007 he recorded with Winter's Thrall, on their EP In:Through:Out.

On Dimmu Borgir's 2002 World Misanthropy video, Barker mentioned the following names as influences on his playing style: Neil Peart (Rush), Gene Hoglan (Dark Angel, Death, Strapping Young Lad), Clive Burr, Nicko McBrain (Iron Maiden), Dave Lombardo (Slayer), and Pete Sandoval (Morbid Angel).

In 2011, Barker joined Los Angeles death metal band Sadistic Intent, replacing longtime drummer Emilio Marquèz.

As of 2012 Barker was drumming in United Forces, featuring two former members of Stormtroopers of Death, vocalist Billy Milano and bassist Dan Lilker, and guitarist Anton Reisenegger. Barker also joined Voices, featuring former members of Akercocke, as live drummer for their tour of the United Kingdom with Winterfylleth.

In July 2023, it was announced that Barker was battling kidney failure. In July 2026, Barker said he also developed calciphylaxis, but that his health had since improved.

== Discography ==
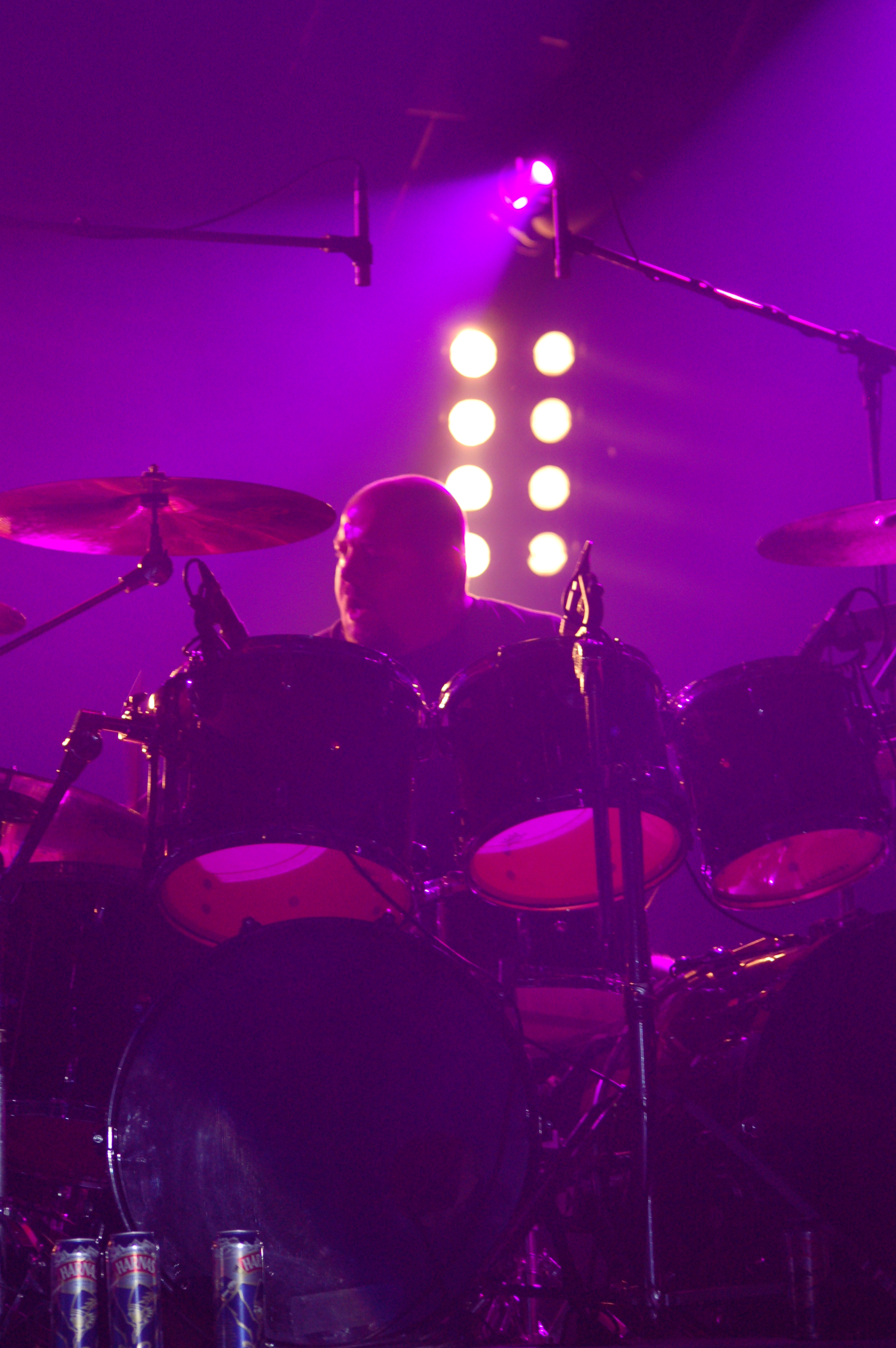
Barker during a Testament concert at the 2007 Metalmania festival in Poland

=== Ancient ===
- Back to the Land of the Dead (2016, Soulseller Records)

=== Borstal ===
- At Her Majesty's Pleasure (2021, Rucktion Records/4 Family Records)

=== Brujeria ===
- Brujerizmo (2000, Roadrunner Records)
- Pocho Aztlan (2016, Nuclear Blast)
- Esto es Brujeria (2023, Nuclear Blast)

=== Cradle of Filth ===
- The Principle of Evil Made Flesh (1994, Cacophonous Records)
- V Empire or Dark Faerytales in Phallustein (1996, Cacophonous Records)
- Dusk... and Her Embrace (1996, Music for Nations)
- Cruelty and the Beast (1998, Music for Nations)
- From the Cradle to Enslave (1999, Music for Nations) (only on the "Funeral in Carpathia" re-recording)

=== Dimmu Borgir ===
- Puritanical Euphoric Misanthropia (2001, Nuclear Blast)
- Alive in Torment EP (2002, Nuclear Blast)
- World Misanthropy EP (2002, Nuclear Blast)
- World Misanthropy DVD (2002, Nuclear Blast)
- Death Cult Armageddon (2003, Nuclear Blast)

=== Liquid Graveyard ===
- By Nature So Perverse LP & CD (2016, Sleaszy Rider Records/Season Of Mist)

=== Lock Up ===
- Pleasures Pave Sewers (1999, Nuclear Blaster)
- Hate Breeds Suffering (2002, Nuclear Blast)
- Play Fast or Die (2004, Toy Factory)
- Necropolis Transparent (2011, Nuclear Blast)
- Demonization (2017, Listenable Records)

=== Monolith ===
- Sleep with the Dead 7" (1992, Cacophonous Records)
- Tales of the Macabre (1993, Vinyl Solution)

=== Noctis Imperium ===
- Glorification of Evil: The Age of the Golden Dawn LP (2008, Ariah Records)

=== Obskkvlt ===
- Blackarhats (2019, Nooirax Producciones)

=== Old Man's Child ===
- In Defiance of Existence (2003, Century Media Records)

=== Shining ===
- Shining (2023, Napalm Records)

=== Twilight of the Gods ===
- Fire on the Mountain (2013, Season of Mist)

=== Winter's Thrall ===
- In:Through:Out EP (2007, self-released)

== Live / session ==
- Borknagar – live drums 1999
- Nightrage – live drums 2004
- Anaal Nathrakh – live drums 2004
- God Seed – live drums 2007 and 2008
- Gorgoroth – live drums 2008
- Divine Heresy - session drums 2007
- Testament – live drums 2007
- Exodus
- Anathema – Bloodstock Open Air UK Festival 2009
- Ancient
- Criminal – live drums in Santiago (2010)
- Evile – live drums in London (12/8/2009)
- Leaves' Eyes – live drums 2009
- Nuclear Assault – live drums on South America shows in April 2019 and Maryland Deathfest XIV (28 May 2016)
- Voices – live drums 2016
