= Predominance =

Studio album by Susperia
- Released: 26 March 2001
- Recorded: Abyss Studios, October 2000
- Genre: Black metal, thrash metal
- Length: 45:11
- Label: Nuclear Blast
- Producer: Peter Tägtgren and Susperia

Susperia chronology
Illusions of Evil (2000)	Predominance (2001)	Vindication (2002)

Professional ratings
Review scores
Source	Rating
AllMusic	3/5 stars
CoC	8/10 stars

Predominance is the debut album by the Norwegian thrash metal band Susperia. Produced at the Abyss Studios, it combines thrash metal with black metal.

== Track listing ==
1. "I Am Pain" – 4:34
2. "Vainglory" – 4:35
3. "Illusions of Evil" – 5:44
4. "Specimen" – 3:57
5. "Journey into Black" – 3:50
6. "Of Hate We Breed" – 4:57
7. "Objects of Desire" – 4:03
8. "The Hellchild" – 4:43
9. "Blood on My Hands" – 5:14
10. "The Coming of a Darker Time" – 3:34

== Personnel ==
- Athera – vocals
- Cyrus – lead guitar
- Elvorn – rhythm guitar
- Memnock – bass
- Tjodalv – drums
