= Old Man's Child =

Norwegian black metal band

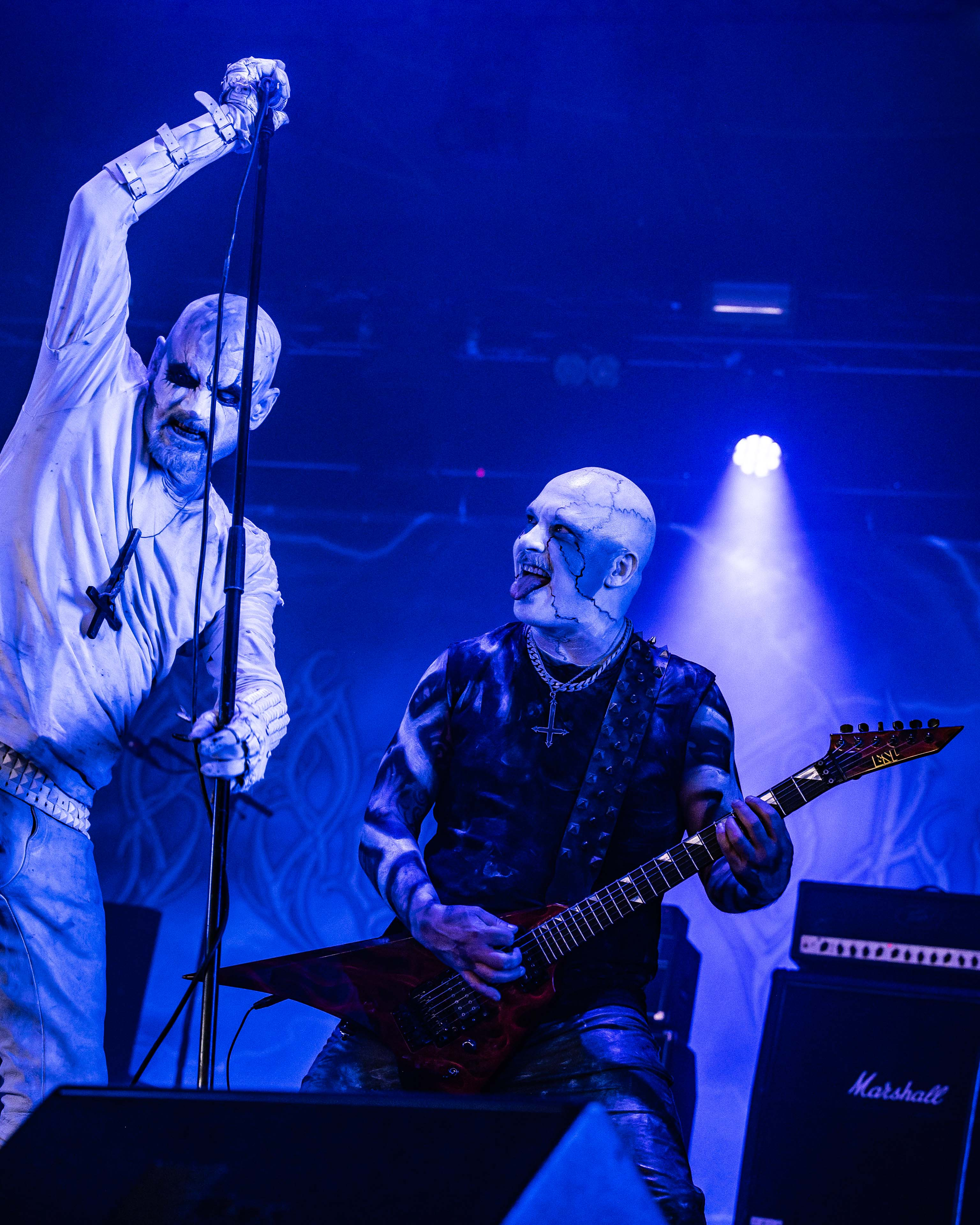
- Hoest and Galder in 2025

Background information
- Origin: Oslo, Norway
- Genres: Melodic black metal, symphonic black metal
- Years active: 1993–present
- Label: Century Media
- Members: Galder; Tjodalv
- Past members: (see below)

Old Man's Child is a Norwegian black metal band from Oslo, founded by Galder (formerly Grusom, born Thomas Rune Andersen), the group's sole permanent member.

== History ==
Old Man's Child was officially founded in 1993, but its roots go back to 1989, when Galder, Jardar, and Tjodalv formed death/thrash band Requiem. They covered songs by Slayer and Metallica, and released a demo album in 1990. "Requiem" dissolved in 1992.

In 1996, after their first full-length album, Born of the Flickering, they signed with Century Media. Following the releases of The Pagan Prosperity and Ill-Natured Spiritual Invasion through Century Media, the band embarked on a rare tour. Old Man's Child tours infrequently due to line-up changes.

In 2000, Galder joined Dimmu Borgir but continued to work with Old Man's Child. Over the years, the band became a one-man project, using session musicians for their albums.

Between 2000 and 2005, Galder released the albums Revelation 666 – The Curse of Damnation (2000), In Defiance of Existence (2003), and Vermin (2005). In July 2008, Old Man's Child announced that they would record their seventh album, Slaves of the World. It was released in 2009.

In an early 2011 interview, Galder stated that he was focused on the current Dimmu Borgir tour. He mentioned that after the tour, he would begin writing music for Old Man's Child, possibly releasing an album in 2012. This did not occur, and the band entered a period of inactivity, during which Galder appeared focused on Dimmu Borgir.

In December 2019, the group was reactivated. Galder posted a video on the band's Facebook page of him working on new Old Man's Child material—the first in over a decade. Galder left Dimmu Borgir in August 2024, announcing that he would finish the new album and tour with Old Man's Child. In March 2025, Galder announced Tjodalv's return to the band to tour in the summer.

== Discography ==
=== Studio albums ===
- Born of the Flickering (1996)
- The Pagan Prosperity (1997)
- Ill-Natured Spiritual Invasion (1998)
- Revelation 666 – The Curse of Damnation (2000)
- In Defiance of Existence (2003)
- Vermin (2005)
- Slaves of the World (2009)

=== Compilations ===
- The Historical Plague (2003)

=== Demos ===
- In the Shades of Life (1994)

=== Splits ===
- Sons of Satan Gather for Attack (with Dimmu Borgir — also known as "Devil's Path / In the Shades of Life") (1999)

== Band members ==
Current members

- Galder (Tom Rune Andersen) – vocals, guitars, bass, keyboards (1993–present)
- Kenneth "Tjodalv" Åkesson – drums (1993–1996, 1999–2001, 2025–present)
- Elvorn – bass (2025–present)
- Cyrus – guitars (2025–present)
- Hoest – vocals (2025–present)

Former members

- Brynjard Tristan – bass (1994–1995)
- Frode "Gonde" Forsmo – bass (1995–1997)
- Jon Øyvind "Jardar" Andersen – guitars, backing vocals (1993–1997, 1999–2003)
- Tony Kirkemo – drums (1996–1997)
- Jan Roger "Grimar" Halvorsen – drums (1999–2000)

Former session musicians

- Bjørn "Aldrahn" Dencker Gjerde - vocals (1995–1996)
- Stian Aarstad – keyboards (1996–1999)
- Gene Hoglan – drums (1998)
- Håkon "Memnoch" Didriksen – bass (2000)
- Nick Barker – drums (2003)
- Reno Kiilerich – drums (2005)
- Peter Wildoer – drums (2008)

=== Recording ===
Album	Vocals	Guitar 1	Guitar 2	Bass	Keyboards	Drums
In the Shades of Life	Galder		Jardar	Brynjard Tristan	Galder	Tjodalv
Born of the Flickering	Galder / Aldrahn	Galder	Jardar	Gonde	Galder	Tjodalv
The Pagan Prosperity	Galder		Jardar	Gonde	Galder	Tony
Ill-Natured Spiritual Invasion	Galder		Galder		Galder	Gene Hoglan
Revelation 666: The Curse of Damnation	Galder		Jardar	Memnoch	Galder	Tjodalv (4 tracks) Jan Roger Halvorsen (4 tracks)
In Defiance of Existence	Galder		Jardar	Galder	Galder	Nick Barker
Vermin	Galder		Galder	Galder	Galder	Reno Kiilerich
Slaves of the World	Galder		Galder	Galder	Galder	Peter Wildoer
