= Voices (British band) =

British extreme metal band

- Origin: London, England
- Genres: Black metal, progressive metal, avant-garde metal
- Years active: 2011–present
- Labels: Candlelight; Church Road
- Spinoff of: Akercocke
- Members: Dan Abela; David Gray; Sam Loynes; Peter Benjamin

Voices are a black metal band from London founded in 2011. Formed by former members of Akercocke, the band has described itself as seeking to produce "extreme and challenging music."

== Biography ==
Voices was formed in 2011 by David Gray, Sam Loynes, and Peter Benjamin following the break-up of Akercocke. In 2012, Voices signed with Candlelight Records. The band released its debut, From the Human Forest Create a Fugue of Imaginary Rain in 2013. Peter Benjamin explained that the band was heavily influenced by movies, particularly the 2009 film Tony London Serial Killer by Gerard Johnson. He described the film as "about a guy who just can't connect with reality at all or people or anything. That’s kind of how we were feeling anyway so we just wanted to make something really cold, lonely, horrible and dissonant, so that’s kind of the whole theme."

Peter Benjamin, reflecting upon Voices' debut, described the album as the outcome of the band just playing "some riffs randomly" that resulted in "a really cathartic explosion, basically." Benjamin also described the album as "horrible music" that he views as more of a demo. David Gray was more forgiving in his assessment of the album, suggesting that "it's pretty much the sound of a live band in a room playing heavy metal – very simple songwriting, performances and production values. That all changed when it came to composing the second album though, I do feel we had to create more artistic ambition to actually create something superior."

In 2014, Voices released the concept album London. The album was once again heavily influenced by a film, in this case the 1999 movie The End of the Affair by Neil Jordan. Peter Benjamin observed that, "With the second one, we thought a lot about where we wanted it to go, with the narrative as well, adding that kind of depth." He described the concept as based on the "real experiences and twisted obsessions from our dark city" that is designed to blend "an intense yet euphoric beauty" with "the terrible, the poisoned and ugliness of London life. Bitter, cold, jealous and alone." David Gray described the concept of London as

the story of a lonely soul in a busy city and the effect it can have on your personality – human interaction or the lack thereof and the dilemmas of an impecunious pseudo hero desperate and alone. His mental illness feeds his obsession with a prostitute, an Eastern European model who dreamed of moving to London and being an actress. Their tragedies collide in the dark, wet streets of South London where sometimes suicide can be a serious option."

Rod Smith, writing for Decibel Magazine, praised the album's focus on its "namesake dystopia" and the manner in which the complexity of the music evolved to represent the downward spiral and ultimately disintegration of the protagonist. Awarding the album a score of 9/10, Smith suggested that, "Even at their best, Akercocke couldn't touch this shit." J.D. Considine, writing for Revolver Magazine described London as "sprawling, ambitious, and coldly beautiful" and suggested that "it’s everything a progressive black-metal concept album should be." Invisible Oranges praised the album as "harrowing, evocative, and full of ideas — mostly good ones," but criticized the album for what writer Joseph Schafer described as "a little misogyny" which stands "in the way of London going from great to excellent."

== Themes ==
Vocalist Peter Benjamin has said that Voices is philosophically distinguished from Akercocke. "Akercocke was more focused on the imagery and ideals of Satanism. For us, it would be boring to go where Akercocke and many other black metal bands have been. We believe that it's time to do something different, so we have taken on our urban surroundings and all that happens within as our influence." Sam Loynes confirmed Benjamin's perspective, noting that "The themes in Voices do not relate to any religious ideology. We are interested in trying to decipher the world that surrounds us. The music forms an impression of our misgivings relating to the distaste we have for this world. Yet, it is still a mystery to us."

== Live performances ==
Voices describes its live performances as "exhibitions." Peter Benjamin explained that "it’s not really a gig, it’s a display of beauty and awfulness. It’s like art, we’re not just a band blasting it out, we’re displaying it."

In 2015, Voices was joined by Nick Barker on drums for its tour of the United Kingdom in support of Winterfylleth. Barker filled in due to permanent drummer David Gray's previous work commitments.

== Members ==
=== Current members ===
- Peter Benjamin – guitars, vocals, piano (2012–present)
- Sam Loynes – guitars, keyboards (2012–present)
- David Gray – drums (2012–present)
- Dan Abela – bass (2012–present)

=== Touring members ===
- Matt Adnett – guitars
- Nick Barker – drums (2015)

== Discography ==
- From the Human Forest Create a Fugue of Imaginary Rain (2013)
- London (2014)
- Frightened (2018)
- Breaking the Trauma Bond (2021)
