= Susperia =

Norwegian thrash metal band

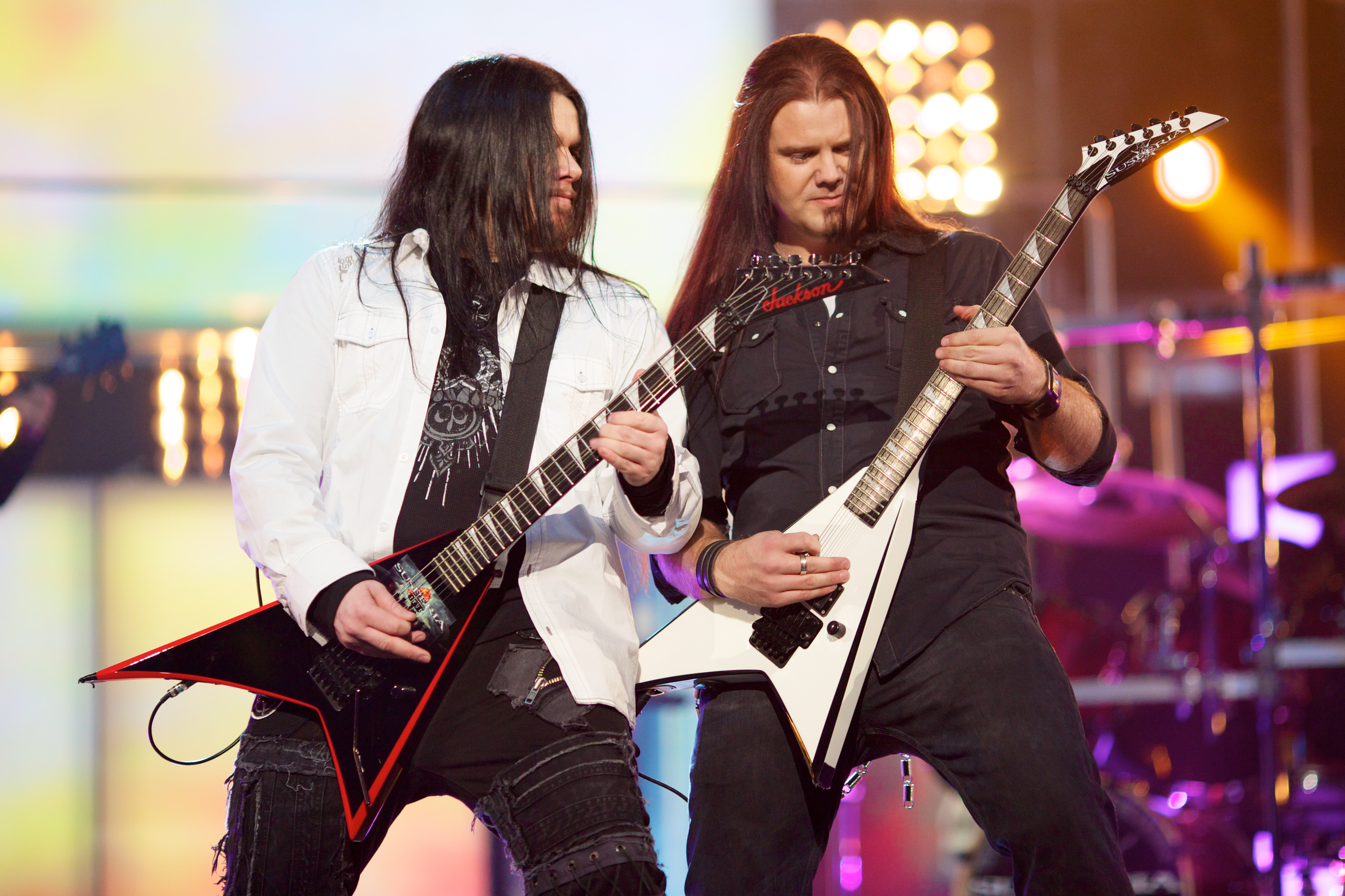
- Susperia performing in 2011

Background information
- Also known as: Seven Sins (1998–2000)
- Origin: Bærum, Norway
- Genres: Thrash metal, black metal (early)
- Years active: 1998–present
- Labels: Nuclear Blast, Tabu, Chrome Division, Candlelight
- Members: Bernt Fjellestad; Cyrus; Elvorn; Memnock; Tjodalv
- Website: susperia.net

Susperia is a Norwegian thrash metal band formed in October 1998 by Tjodalv and Cyrus. The band change their original name, Seven Sins, because another band already had it. They renamed themselves after the film Suspiria, changing the spelling to differentiate themselves from Suspiria, a gothic rock band also named after the film.

== History ==
Tjodalv (Dimmu Borgir, Old Man's Child) and Cyrus (Satyricon, Old Man's Child) started Susperia in October 1998. After Tjodalv left Dimmu Borgir in March 1999, he and Cyrus concentrated on Susperia. At Wacken Open Air in 1999, Tjodalv met singer Athera (Vanaheim). He, guitarist Elvorn, and bassist Memnock (Old Man's Child, Vanaheim) joined the band. They recorded the demo Illusions of Evil in December 1999 at Pitfire Studio outside Oslo, which L. Argedick mixed and mastered. Mustis (Dimmu Borgir) played synthesizer and piano. He was briefly an official band member before he left to concentrate on Dimmu Borgir. Mustis returned to the band in 2010, after Dimmu Borgir fired him.

They sent the demo to record companies and received some positive feedback. They signed with Nuclear Blast for four records in early 2000. Susperia played their first live show at John Dee in Oslo, following Ragnarok and Alsvartr. A few months later, they played at the Scream Magazine 10-year anniversary party.

In March 2009, vocalist Athera (real name Pål Mathisen) reportedly suffered a heart attack. It was later confirmed that he had been rushed to hospital in Lørenskog, suffering from acute stomach pain and heavy bleeding. He was expected to remain hospitalised for some time. It was later announced that he would undergo a triple bypass operation on 16 March 2009.

Susperia joined Melodi Grand Prix in 2011, but lost before the semi-final.

Cyrus played bass with Dimmu Borgir between 2010 and 2018, having previously filled in on lead guitar in 2008.

In 2015, founding vocalist Athera left the band.

== Musical style ==
On their early albums, the band experimented with a mixture of black and thrash metal. Testament, one of the members' favorite bands, was a major influence, and by the time the album Unlimited was released, the black metal elements had disappeared. Instead, the band gave more space to influences from heavy metal. Today, Susperia are generally regarded as a melodic thrash metal band.

The lyrics written by singer Athera are personal and either purely fictional or autobiographical. Politics and religion are not dealt with, nor are certain concepts. Athera uses both guttural and clean vocals.

Susperia is not a Satanic band, though their lyrics tend to criticise and question the views and morals of Christianity.

== Band members ==
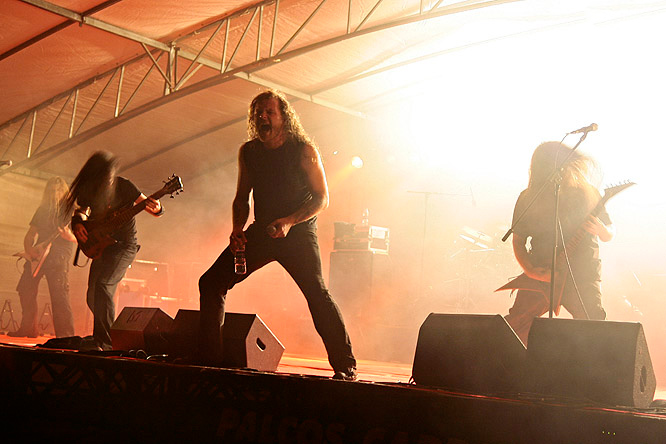
Susperia in 2008

Current members

- Terje "Cyrus" Andersen – guitars (1998–present)
- Christian "Elvorn" Hagen – guitars (1998–present)
- Ian Kenneth "Tjodalv" Åkesson – drums (1998–present)

Former members

- Håkon "Memnock" Didriksen – bass (1998–2019)
- Pål "Athera" Mathiesen – vocals (1998–2015; touring musician: 2019)
- Øyvind Johan "Mustis" Mustaparta – keyboards (1998–2000; touring musician: 2010–2011)
- Bernt "Dagon" Fjellstad – vocals (2015–2019; touring musician: 2009, 2014–2015)

Live musicians

- Lars "Tristhan" Fredriksen – bass (2019)

Timeline

== Discography ==
=== Studio albums ===
- Predominance (2001)
- Vindication (2002)
- Unlimited (2004)
- Cut from Stone (2007)
- Attitude (2009)
- The Lyricist (2018)

=== EPs/singles ===
- Devil May Care (2005)
- Nothing Remains (single, 2011)
- We Are the Ones (2011)

=== Demos ===
- Illusions of Evil (2000)
