= Slaves of the World =

Studio album by Old Man's Child
- Released: 18 May 2009
- Recorded: Studio Fredman in Gothenburg, Sweden
- Genre: Symphonic black metal
- Label: Century Media
- Producer: Fredrik Nordström

Old Man's Child chronology
| Vermin (2005) | Slaves of the World (2009) |

Alternative Cover
- Alternative Artwork for the Limited Edition Digipak

Professional ratings
Review scores
| Source | Rating |
|---|---|
| About.com | 4/5 stars |
| Fangoria | 4/5 stars |
| Rock Sound | 7/10 stars |
| Sputnikmusic | 4/5 stars |

Slaves of the World is the seventh studio album by Norwegian black metal band Old Man's Child. The album was released 18 May 2009 in Europe and 19 May 2009 in North America via Century Media Records. The album was recorded in autumn 2008 at Studio Fredman in Gothenburg, Sweden, with producer Fredrik Nordström. All instruments were recorded by Galder with the exception of drums, which were played by Peter Wildoer (Darkane).

== Track listing ==
1. "Slaves of the World" - 4:41
2. "Saviours of Doom" - 4:03
3. "The Crimson Meadows" - 4:34
4. "Unholy Foreign Crusade" - 3:40
5. "Path of Destruction" - 5:21
6. "The Spawn of Lost Creation" - 4:07
7. "On the Devil's Throne" - 4:49
8. "Ferden Mot Fienden's Land" - 5:34
9. "Servants of Satan's Monastery" - 5:19
10. "Born of the Flickering" - 5:05 (limited edition bonus track)

== Personnel ==
- Galder – vocals, guitar, bass, keyboards
- Peter Wildoer – drums

=== Crew ===
- Fredrik Nordstrom – production
- Henrik Udd – engineering, mixing
- Christophe Szpajdel – logo
