= Abrahadabra (album) =

- Cover art by Joachim Luetke

Studio album by Dimmu Borgir
- Released: 22 September 2010
- Studios: Dug Out Studios, Uppsala, Sweden; Living Room Studios, Oslo, Norway; Pimp Plaza Recordings, Oslo, Norway; NRK Studios, Oslo, Norway
- Genre: Symphonic black metal
- Length: 48:56
- Label: Nuclear Blast
- Producer: Dimmu Borgir

Dimmu Borgir chronology
The Invaluable Darkness (2008)	Abrahadabra (2010)	Eonian (2018)

Singles from Abrahadabra
- 1. "Gateways" Released: 20 August 2010; 2. "Dimmu Borgir" Released: 3 January 2011

Professional ratings
Review scores
Source	Rating
Absurd History	4.5/5 stars
Allmusic	4/5 stars
Metal Hammer	(de)
Lords of Metal	(8.7/10)
Fury Rocks	(8.2/10)
Blabbermouth.net	7.5/10 stars
BW&BK	6/10 stars

Abrahadabra is the eighth studio album by Norwegian symphonic black metal band Dimmu Borgir, released in 2010. The first single from the album, "Gateways", was released on 20 August in Europe and 24 August in North America. On 14 September a video for "Gateways" was released featuring Djerv front-woman, Agnete Kjølsrud. On 17 September the song "Born Treacherous" was released on Dimmu Borgir's official Myspace for streaming. On 24 September the band announced they would stream Abrahadabra in its entirety, until 7 p.m. EST that evening. This would mark the first official release of all the tracks on the album. The album features drummer Daray and additional keyboards by Gerlioz.

== Track listing ==
All lyrics written by Silenoz. All music composed by Shagrath, Silenoz and Galder.

No.	Title	Length
1.	"Xibir" (Instrumental)	2:50
2.	"Born Treacherous"	5:02
3.	"Gateways"	5:10
4.	"Chess with the Abyss"	4:08
5.	"Dimmu Borgir"	5:35
6.	"Ritualist"	5:13
7.	"The Demiurge Molecule"	5:29
8.	"A Jewel Traced Through Coal"	5:16
9.	"Renewal"	4:11
10.	"Endings and Continuations"	5:58

Europe Limited edition
No.	Title	Length
11.	"Gateways" (Orchestral version)	5:44

Mailorder edition
No.	Title	Length
11.	"DMDR (Dead Men Don't Rape)" (GGFH cover)	4:24
12.	"Perfect Strangers" (Deep Purple cover)	5:01
13.	"Gateways" (Orchestral version)	5:44
14.	"Dimmu Borgir" (Orchestral version)	5:35
15.	"Gateways" (Music video)

USA Limited edition
No.	Title	Length
11.	"Dimmu Borgir" (Orchestral version)	5:35

Japanese Limited edition
No.	Title	Length
11.	"Gateways" (Orchestral version)	5:44
12.	"Perfect Strangers" (Deep Purple cover)	5:01

iTunes edition
No.	Title	Length
11.	"Gateways" (Orchestral version)	5:44
12.	"The Demiurge Molecule" (Orchestral version)	5:23
13.	"Gateways" (Music video)

HOT TOPIC edition
No.	Title	Length
11.	"DMDR (Dead Men Don't Rape)" (GGFH cover)	4:24
12.	"Perfect Strangers" (Deep Purple cover)	5:03
13.	"Gateways" (Music video)

== Production ==
Abrahadabra was in production for eleven months. Silenoz explained that the growing periods of time between albums was because the band had stopped writing music while touring, which was affecting the quality of the music. He described the new album as having an "eerie and haunting feel to it," adding that the material is "epic," "primal," atmospheric and ambient. A promotional image released with the statement showed Shagrath returning to the keyboards. The album features an ensemble orchestra, the Kringkastingsorkestret (the Norwegian Radio Orchestra), as well as the Schola Cantorum choir, totaling more than 100 musicians and singers.

Gaute Storaas, composer of the orchestral arrangements, released a statement on his role in working on the album. "Their music is epic, thematic and symphonic already from the creation; they are clearly having an orchestral approach to composing. My role in this is sometimes just to transcribe their themes, sometimes to take their ideas, tear them apart and build them back up in ways that are true to the band's intentions. The music must also be both interesting and playable for the musicians, and hopefully, meet the quality standards of the orchestral world.".

=== Title and artwork ===
"Abrahadabra", loosely translated as "I will create as I speak", was created by author Aleister Crowley in his work Liber AL vel Legis, or The Book of the Law. This album is the second in the band's repertoire to deviate from the traditional three-word title. Silenoz explained: "[It made] a lot of sense for us to move on from that. It has served its purpose. We are a band that's all about change and moving forward. An album title consisting of one word goes hand-in-hand with the new material". In addition, Silenoz referenced the changes in the band's "musical and lyrical content", as well as changes in the band's line-up playing a role.

The album cover artwork was designed by Joachim Luetke, who described the artwork's setting as "icy, bleak, wintery, [and] post-industrial". Luetke added that the central figure's mask on the cover is representative of H. P. Lovecraft's Elder Gods. "The mask/face personifies dominion of powers far beyond mankind. The nameless gods witnessed the birth of our universe and they'll watch it implode. To them, the age of mankind is but a blink of an eye".

After the release of the album, the band announced that all future pressings would carry a different album cover.

=== Musical style ===
As stated by guitarists, Silenoz and Galder, in an interview with Outune.net, the album presents musical influences reminiscent of Puritanical Euphoric Misanthropia and Death Cult Armageddon, with more emphasis on orchestral arrangements.

=== Lyrical content ===
The album's lyrics are a notable departure from the usual style that Dimmu Borgir implements. Songs contain subjects that deal with redemption, power, rebirth and astral planes, among other, more vague concepts. Rather than focus on ideas that are often panned as Satanic and offensive, the band has instead opted to use more worldly and open matters. The start of track six contains a backward message: "In Nomine dei Nostri Satanas Luciferi" (English translation: In the name of our God, Satan the Morning Star).

== Personnel ==
Dimmu Borgir

- Shagrath – lead vocals; keyboards, programming
- Galder – lead guitar, additional vocals (track 5)
- Silenoz – rhythm guitar, additional vocals (track 5)

Additional musicians

- Dariusz Brzozowski – drums
- Snowy Shaw – bass, clean vocals (track 4, 6, 9)
- Geir Bratland – keyboards
- Agnete Kjølsrud – additional vocals (track 3, 10)
- Garm – additional vocals (track 10)
- Andy Sneap – lead guitar (track 3, 9), mixing, mastering
- Ricky Black – slide guitar (track 10)
- Kringkastingsorkesteret (Norwegian Radio Orchestra)
  - Atle Sponberg – concertmaster
  - Rune Halvorsen – conductor
- Schola Cantorum
  - Tone Bianca Dahl – chorus master

Production

- Dimmu Borgir – production, mixing, mastering
  - Shagrath – photography, sound engineering, keyboards recording
- Gaute Storaas – choir and orchestra arrangements
- Russ Russell – mastering, sound engineering, guitars and bass recording
- Daniel Bergstrand – sound engineering, drums and vocals recording
- Urban Naesvall – drum technician
- Petter Braar – guitar technician
- Kjell Ivar Lund, Marcelo Vasco, Tove Asum Forwald – photography
- Tyson Tabbert – masks and armour construction
- Joachim Luetke – cover artwork and layout, photography
- Giuliana Mayo, Tod Waters – clothing design and construction
- Yvette Uhlmann – management

Note

- Drums and vocals recorded in Dugout Studios, Uppsala, Sweden.
- Guitars and bass recorded in Livingroom Studios, Oslo, Norway.
- Keyboards and additional tracking recorded at Pimp Plaza Recordings, Oslo, Norway.
- Orchestra and choirs recorded at the NRK Studios, Oslo, Norway.
- Mastered at Backstage Studio, Derbyshire, England.

== Release history ==
Country	Date
Japan	22 September 2010
Germany	24 September 2010
Europe	27 September 2010
Australia	1 October 2010
United States	12 October 2010
India	15 October 2010

== Charts ==
Chart (2010)	Peak position
Australian Albums (ARIA Charts)	87
Austrian Albums Chart	20
Belgian Albums Chart	41
Croatian Albums Chart	25
Dutch Albums Chart	100
European Top 100 Albums	33
Finnish Albums Chart	8
French Albums Chart	43
German Albums Chart	15
Japanese Albums Chart	282
Norwegian Albums Chart	2
Polish Albums Chart	50
Swedish Albums Chart	17
Swiss Albums Chart	24
UK Albums Chart	117
US Billboard 200	42
