= Liquid Graveyard =

British death metal band

- Origin: UK
- Genres: Death metal, progressive metal
- Years active: 2006–present
- Labels: My Kingdom Music (Italy); Rising Records (UK); Sleaszy Rider Records (Greece)
- Members: Raquel Walker; John Walker

Liquid Graveyard are a British progressive death metal band formed in 2006 by John Walker, frontman and guitarist of Cancer, Adrian de Buitléar, ex-bassist of Mourning Beloveth, and vocalist Raquel Walker.

The band recruited Shane Embury (Napalm Death, Lock Up, Brujeria) and Nick Barker (Lock Up, Dimmu Borgir, Cradle of Filth) to record their third album, By Nature So Perverse, released in 2016 on Sleaszy Rider Records.

== Members ==
- Raquel Walker – vocals
- John Walker – guitars

Additional members:

- Nick Barker – drums
- Shane Embury – bass

Session members

- Daniel Maganto – bass

== Discography ==
- Criministers (2008) (demo)
- On Evil Days (2009) (My Kingdom Music )
- Ecstasy (2010) (compilation album – My Kingdom Music )
- The Fifth Time I Died (2011) (Rising Records)
- By Nature So Perverse (2016) (Sleaszy Rider)
