= Attitude (Susperia album) =

Studio album by Susperia
- Released: 18 May 2009
- Recorded: October–December 2008
- Genre: Thrash metal
- Length: 36:41
- Label: Candlelight
- Producer: Susperia and Marius Strand

Susperia chronology
Cut from Stone (2007)	Attitude (2009)	The Lyricist (2018)

Alternative cover
- Limited edition slip cover

Professional ratings
Review scores
Source	Rating
AllMusic	3.5/5 stars

Attitude is the fifth studio album by the Norwegian thrash metal band Susperia.

== Track listing ==
All tracks are written by Susperia

No.	Title	Length
1.	"The Urge"	3:58
2.	"Live My Dreams"	3:30
3.	"Attitude"	3:41
4.	"Elegy and Suffering"	3:58
5.	"Sick Bastard"	4:06
6.	"Another Turn"	3:23
7.	"Mr. Stranger"	4:43
8.	"Character Flaw"	4:28
9.	"The One After All"	5:05

== Personnel ==
- Athera – vocals
- Cyrus – guitar
- Elvorn – guitar
- Memnock – bass
- Tjodalv – drums

=== Production ===
- Arranged by Susperia
- Produced by Susperia and Marius Strand
- Recorded and engineered by Marius Strand and Cyrus
- Mixed by Henrik Udd and Fredrik Nordstrom
- Mastered by Tim Turan

== Release history ==
Country	Date
Europe	18 May 2009
United States	19 May 2009
