= Alive in Torment =

EP by Dimmu Borgir
- Released: 26 February 2002
- Recorded: 4 April 2001
- Venue: LKA Longhorn, Stuttgart, Germany
- Genre: Symphonic black metal
- Length: 25:01
- Label: Nuclear Blast
- Producer: Dimmu Borgir

Dimmu Borgir chronology
Puritanical Euphoric Misanthropia (2001)	Alive in Torment (2002)	World Misanthropy (2002)

Professional ratings
Review scores
Source	Rating
AllMusic	2.5/5 stars

Alive in Torment is the third EP by Norwegian symphonic black metal band Dimmu Borgir. It was recorded in Stuttgart, Germany on 4 April 2001, during the tour supporting their fifth studio album Puritanical Euphoric Misanthropia.

== Track listing ==
No.	Title	Writer(s)	Length
1.	"Tormentor of Christian Souls"	Kopperud, Thoresen	5:25
2.	"The Blazing Monoliths of Defiance"	Thoresen, Nagash	4:32
3.	"The Insight and the Catharsis"	Thoresen, Silenoz	7:10
4.	"Puritania"	Lunde, Shagrath, Silenoz	3:07
5.	"The Maelstrom Mephisto"	Archon, Galder, Mustis, Shagrath, Silenoz	4:50

== Personnel ==
- Shagrath – lead vocals
- Silenoz – rhythm guitar
- Galder – lead guitar
- Nicholas Barker – drums
- ICS Vortex – bass, clean vocals
- Mustis – synthesizers, piano
