= Vindication (Susperia album) =

Studio album by Susperia
- Released: 6 May 2002
- Recorded: November–December 2001
- Studio: Abyss Studio A
- Genre: Black metal, thrash metal
- Length: 46:26
- Label: Nuclear Blast
- Producer: Peter Tägtgren and Susperia

Susperia chronology
Predominance (2001)	Vindication (2002)	Unlimited (2004)

Professional ratings
Review scores
Source	Rating
AllMusic	2.5/5 stars

Vindication is the second studio album by Norwegian black metal band Susperia. It was produced by Peter Tägtgren completely free of charge before closing down his studio.

== Track listing ==
All lyrics are written by Athera (lyrical concept for Dead Man's World by Memnock); all music is composed by Cyrus

No.	Title	Length
1.	"Cage of Remembrance"	4:53
2.	"The Bitter Man"	4:33
3.	"Anguished Scream (For Vengeance)"	4:46
4.	"Petrified"	4:48
5.	"The Bounty Hunter"	4:44
6.	"Completion"	4:41
7.	"Warmaster"	5:12
8.	"Dead Man's World"	3:47
9.	"Cast Life into Fire"	4:08
10.	"Bleed Yourself"	4:54

== Personnel ==
- Athera – vocals
- Cyrus – lead and rhythm guitar
- Elvorn – rhythm guitar
- Memnock – bass
- Tjodalv – drums

Production

- Music recorded in Abyss Studio A – Sweden during November and December 2001
- Music engineered and recorded by Lars Szöke
- Vocals recorded in BBM Studio – Norway during December 2001
- Vocals engineered and recorded by Bjorn Boge
- Vocals produced by Athera. Assisted by Bjorn Boge
- Album mixed by Peter Tägtgren
- Album produced by Susperia and Peter Tägtgren
- Album mastered at Cutting Room, Stockholm by Björn Engelmann
- Cover design, artwork and logo by Rune Tyvold
