= The Serpentine Offering =

Single by Dimmu Borgir

from the album In Sorte Diaboli
- Released: March 30, 2007
- Recorded: June–November 2006
- Genre: Symphonic black metal
- Length: 13:53
- Label: Nuclear Blast Records
- Songwriters: Shagrath, Silenoz and Galder.
- Producer: Dimmu Borgir

Dimmu Borgir singles chronology
"'"Vredesbyrd"'" (2004)	"The Serpentine Offering" (2007)	"'"The Sacrilegious Scorn"'" (2007)

"The Serpentine Offering" is a single by Dimmu Borgir from their 2007 album In Sorte Diaboli. The European version of the single features an instrumental version of "The Serpentine Offering" and the North American version, instead, features an instrumental version of "The Heretic Hammer".

== Music video ==
The video for "The Serpentine Offering" was directed by Patric Ullaeus.

On beginning of the music video, the following lines appear:

What you believe to be true is false
What you thought right, wrong

The music video begins with Christian crusaders (Teutonic Knights) raiding a Lithuanian village and slaughtering innocent people. Here, a priest's assistant is shown to dislike killing people just because of faith. When crusaders find a woman, who had just given birth, hiding in the barn and set it afire to incinerate her, the priest's assistant leaves to the forest where he pulls off and throws to the ground the Christian cross he was wearing, symbolizing his rejection of Christianity. Later a group of Lithuanians are shown in a cave in the forest, and later around a fire. In the end of the video they attack and win the battle against the Christian crusaders.

In the end of the music video following lines appear:

The battle will never end
In Sorte Diaboli - Antichristus Spiritualis

== Track listing ==
=== European version ===
1. "The Serpentine Offering" (Album Version) – 5:09
2. "The Serpentine Offering" (Single Version) – 3:37
3. "The Serpentine Offering" (Instrumental Version) - 5:11

=== North American Version ===
1. "The Serpentine Offering" (Album Version) – 5:09
2. "The Serpentine Offering" (Single Version) – 3:37
3. "The Heretic Hammer" (Instrumental Version) - 4:37

=== 7" Version ===
1. "The Serpentine Offering" (Single Version) – 3:37
2. "The Serpentine Offering" (Instrumental Version) - 5:11

=== Promotional Version ===
1. "The Serpentine Offering" (Video Edit) – 4:42
