= Schola Cantorum (Norwegian choir) =

Schola Cantorum is a chamber choir from Norway. The choir was founded by composer and conductor Knut Nystedt in 1964, and has given valuable musical experience to generations of Norwegian musicians. Affiliated with the University of Oslo, Department of Musicology, the choir recruits most of their singers from this institution, as well as the Norwegian Academy of Music.

== History and repertoire ==
The American choral tradition in which the founder Nystedt was trained emphasises the importance of new music – a practice Nystedt brought back with him to Oslo. Knut Nystedt’s music became a vital element of Schola Cantorum’s repertoire.

Tone Bianca Sparre Dahl became conductor in 2002, and has further established the choir’s firm position in Norway’s musical life. She has continued Nystedt’s tradition of performing modern music. The repertoire consists of a mix of contemporary and older choir music, as well as folk music arrangements. In recent years the choir has increasingly focused on commissioned works from young Nordic composers.

Schola Cantorum has a varied repertoire that includes contemporary music, folk music and collaboration with the metal band Dimmu Borgir on their past two albums, Abrahadabra (2010) and Eonian (2018). In recent years the choir has visited Ukraine, Germany, Italy, South Korea, Russia, England and the Nordic countries. The choir collaborates regularly with leading musicians and ensembles such as the Norwegian Radio Orchestra, the Norwegian Wind Ensemble and Nordic Voices.

== Competitions ==
In 2005 the choir participated in the prestigious international choir competition in Tolosa, Spain, and won every award as well as the Grand Prize - never before won by a Norwegian choir.

In 2007, Schola Cantorum competed in another prestigious competition, EBU's Let the Peoples Sing, and won first prize in the adult choir class, as well as the main prize - «The Silver Rose Bowl».

== Recordings ==
Schola Cantorum has released four CDs with producer Morten Lindberg of Lindberg Lyd. The first in 1997 and 1999 under conductor Kåre Hanken. Featuring music by Norwegian composers, they were not released outside of Norway. Their third CD, Audiens (2010) is released on the label 2L and features music by composer Bjørn Morten Christophersen. Their newest album Hymn to the Virgin, a recording of hymns to Mary, the Mother of God, was released internationally in May 2013. The choir also contributed to American composer Christopher Tin's second album The Drop That Contained The Sea which was released in 2014.
