= Born of the Flickering =

Studio album by Old Man's Child
- Released: 1996
- Recorded: November–December 1995
- Genre: Melodic black metal
- Length: 51:15
- Label: Hot
- Producer: Old Man's Child, Tom Sennerud

Old Man's Child chronology
In the Shades of Life (1994)	Born of the Flickering (1996)	The Pagan Prosperity (1997)

Alternate cover
- Century Media cover

Professional ratings
Review scores
Source	Rating
Allmusic	3/5 stars

Born of the Flickering is the debut studio album by Norwegian black metal band Old Man's Child. It was released in 1996, through Hot Records, then later through Century Media with different artwork.

== Track listing ==
1. "Demons of the Thorncastle" – 4:47
2. "Swallowed by a Buried One" – 4:51
3. "Born of the Flickering" – 5:05
4. "King of the Dark Ages" – 5:27
5. "Wounds from the Night of Magic" – 3:28
6. "On Through the Desert Storm" – 4:20
7. "Christian Death" – 4:55
8. "Funeral, Swords and Souls" – 4:56
9. "The Last Chapter" – 4:42
10. "...Leads to Utopia/The Old Man's Dream" – 8:44

== Personnel ==
- Galder – vocals, guitar, synthesizer
- Jardar – guitar
- Tjodalv – drums
- Gonde – bass guitar
- Aldrahn - vocals

=== Additional personnel ===
- Christophe Szpajdel — logo
