= Chrome Division =

Norwegian heavy metal band

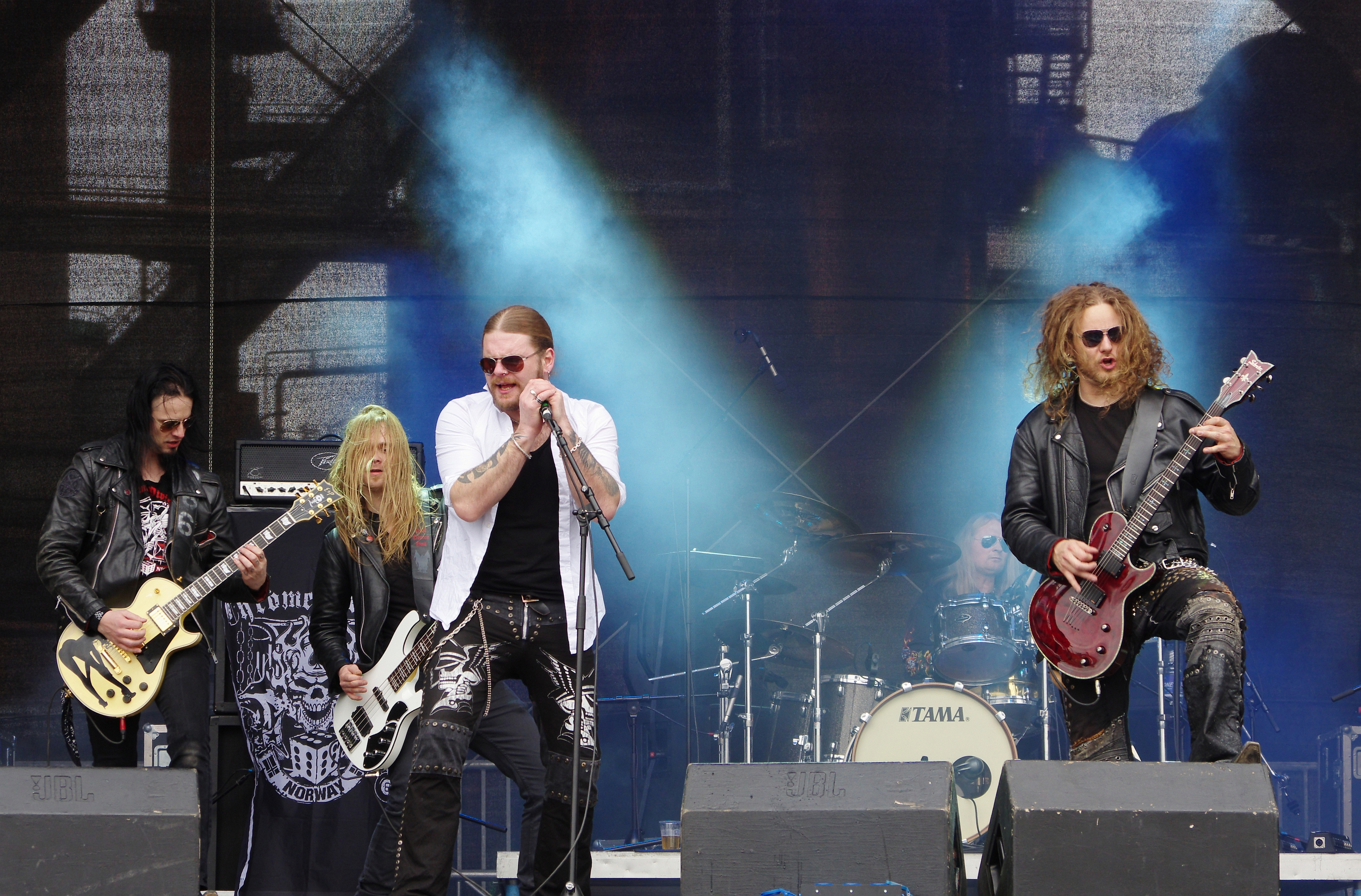
- Chrome Division in 2013

Background information
- Origin: Oslo, Norway
- Genres: Heavy metal, hard rock, biker metal
- Years active: 2004–present
- Label: Nuclear Blast
- Members: Eddie Guz; Mr. Damage; Shagrath; Tony White
- Past members: Lex Icon; Shady Blue; Ricky Black; Björn Luna; Ogee
- Website: chromedivision.com

Chrome Division is a Norwegian rock band formed in 2004. The current lineup consists of founding member Shagrath (also of Dimmu Borgir) on rhythm guitar, along with Eddie Guz as the vocalist, Mr Damage on lead guitar and Tony White on drums. The band has released five albums through Nuclear Blast: Doomsday Rock 'n Roll in 2006, Booze, Broads and Beelzebub in 2008, 3rd Round Knockout in 2011, Infernal Rock Eternal in 2014, and One Last Ride in 2018. The band announced that their fifth album would be their last.

As of early 2024/2025, no new album has been officially released beyond One Last Ride, and no widely reported announcements confirm a concrete follow-up. However, the band's social media indicates ongoing presence and suggests they have not fully disbanded.

== History ==
=== Formation ===
The idea for the band was conceived by Shagrath (Stian Thoresen) and Lex Icon (Stian Arnesen), both members of Dimmu Borgir at the time, in 1999. This consisted of the two musicians jamming after Dimmu Borgir rehearsals. With Shagrath on guitars and Lex Icon on drums, they recorded some material, but could take it no further due to their commitments to their other bands. Shagrath later said that Dimmu Borgir will always be his priority.

It was not until mid-2004 that the band was properly formed. Shagrath and Lex Icon once again met up, and by this time Lex Icon had left Dimmu Borgir and founded The Kovenant. Shagrath had free time due to Dimmu Borgir taking a break after Ozzfest. Shagrath got in contact with bassist Björn Luna (of Ashes to Ashes) and invited him to join them. The trio formed the base of Chrome Project. Luna then contacted Eddie Guz (of The Carburetors) who joined as vocalist, after Jarle Bernhoft of Span had to decline. Guitarist Ricky Black was the final member to be drafted in. Shortly afterwards, Lex Icon was replaced with drummer Tony White of Minis Tirith, because he was missing a large number of practice sessions, which was holding the band back. Although Shagrath has said that he never meant for Chrome Division to be a side project, many critics have referred to it as such. Björn Luna has stated that he considers Chrome Division to be a "proper band" rather than a side project.

=== Doomsday Rock 'n Roll (2004–2006) ===
It was this lineup that entered the Panzer Studio in Oslo to record the band's first album, Doomsday Rock 'n Roll, on 4 December 2005. The album was produced by Björn Bergesen, who was chosen for his commitment to the band and the fact that he was a fan of them. Chrome Division announced that they had signed with Nuclear Blast on 1 February 2006. It was through Nuclear Blast that Doomsday Rock N' Roll was released on 8 August 2006, in North America, and slightly earlier in Norway, where it entered the charts at number 31. It received numerous positive reviews, and some that were less positive. Jackie Smit, of Chronicles of Chaos, said "the band seemingly ends up having more [fun] than the listener". Although the album was described as being unoriginal by reviewers, Live-Metal.net's Jeff Maki claims that "what makes this album special is the high level of talent with which it is performed". Adam Harrold, of Rock Something, finished his review with the thought that the album "might not be smartest record of 2006, but it is the sweatiest." Chrome Division also recorded a music video for the song "Serial Killer" to publicise the album. The video was directed by Patric Ullaeus, a Swedish director.

=== Booze, Broads and Beelzebub (2007) ===
Although there was no official release on the subject, Shagrath said in an interview with Live-Metal.net that Chrome Division had several new songs post Doomsday Rock 'n Roll, and that the band would probably try to produce a new album in mid-2007. Björn Luna also said that there was to be a second album in an interview on MetalEagle.com and explained that the band has signed a three-album contract with Nuclear Blast.

On 15 January 2008, Chrome Division announced they had finished recording their second album. It was recorded between 7 and 14 January 2008 at Studio Fredman. The album, entitled Booze, Broads and Beelzebub, was released on 18 July 2008, with the band claiming it is "a much better sounding album than the first one".

In addition, the band issued a statement on their MySpace confirming preparation for their third release.

== Musical style ==
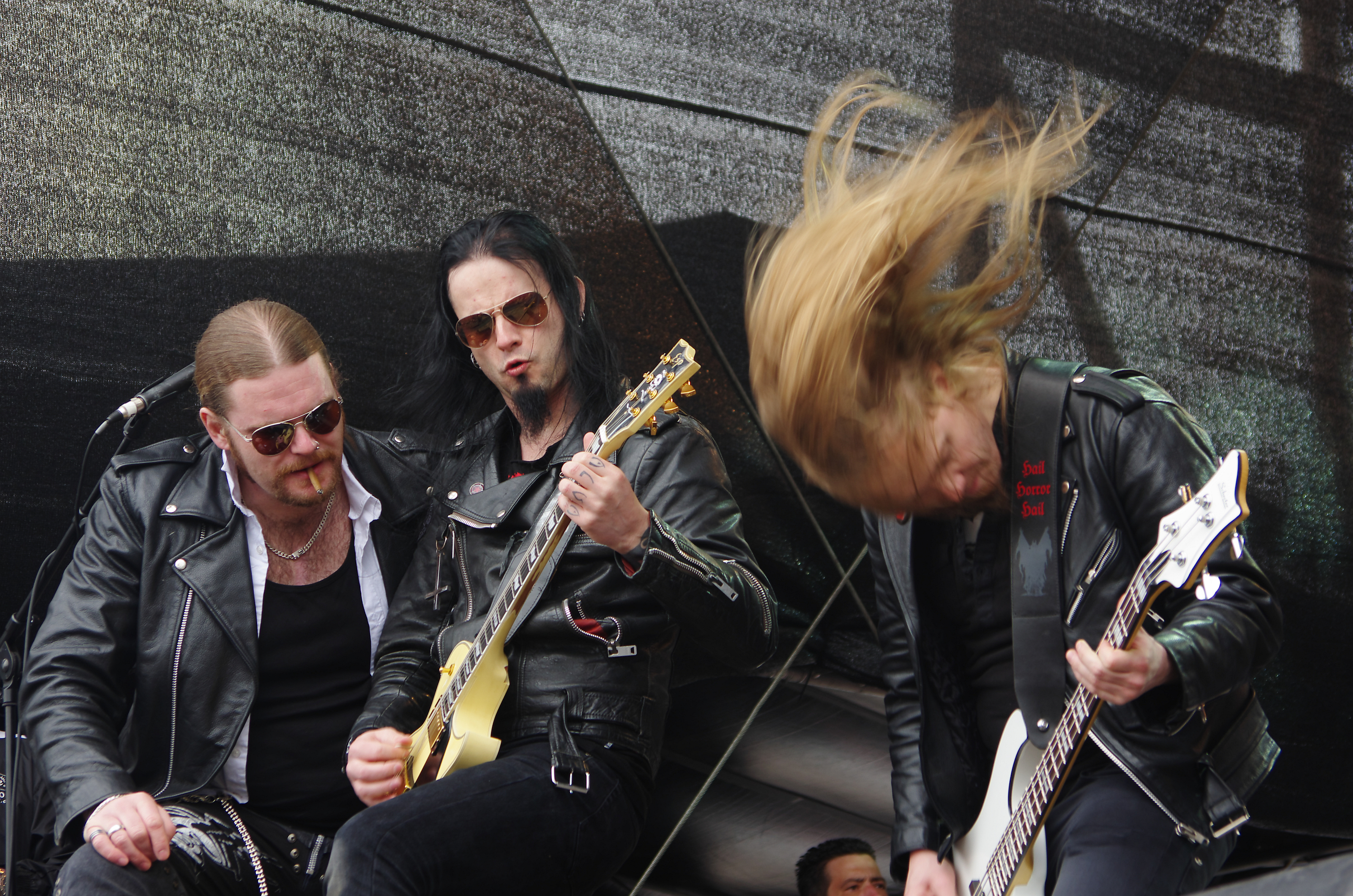
Chrome Division performing in 2013

Shagrath cites Chrome Division's influences as Black Label Society, Spiritual Beggars and AC/DC, and says that he wanted the band to sound like an '80s rock 'n roll heavy metal band. He also talked about the band trying adhere to that image, through lyrical content and such. Reviewers compared the sound of the music to Motörhead and Black Label Society and compared the "fun" attitude of the band to the punk band Turbonegro. Martin Popoff called Chrome Division a biker metal band. Other common labels include hard rock and heavy metal. Shagrath has said that future releases from the band will be "musically the same thing", but that they will "try to add different ingredients" and they may also change the lyrical content.

== Members ==
=== Current lineup ===
- Shagrath (Stian Thoresen) – rhythm guitar (2004–present), bass (2017–present)
- Tony White (Tony Kirkemo) – drums (2004–present)
- Eddie Guz (Edwin Gustoff) – vocals (2004–2009, 2017–present)
- Kjell Aage "Damage" Karlsen – lead guitar (2012–present)

=== Former members ===
- Lex Icon (Stian Arnesen) – drums (2004)
- Shady Blue (Pål Mathiesen) – vocals (2009–2017)
- Björn Luna – bass (2004–2012)
- Ricky Black (Rikard Wikstrand) – lead guitar (2004–2012)
- Ogee (Åge Trøite) – bass (2012–2017)

== Discography ==
- Doomsday Rock 'n Roll (2006), Nuclear Blast
- Booze, Broads and Beelzebub (2008), Nuclear Blast
- 3rd Round Knockout (2011), Nuclear Blast
- Infernal Rock Eternal (2014), Nuclear Blast
- One Last Ride (2018), Nuclear Blast
