= Vredesbyrd =

Single by Dimmu Borgir

from the album Death Cult Armageddon
- Released: May 14, 2004
- Recorded: 2003
- Genre: Symphonic black metal, melodic black metal
- Length: 7:18
- Label: Nuclear Blast Records
- Songwriters: Mustis, Shagrath, Silenoz
- Producer: Dimmu Borgir

Dimmu Borgir singles chronology
"'"Progenies of the Great Apocalypse"'" (2003)	"Vredesbyrd" (2004)	"'"The Serpentine Offering"'" (2007)

"Vredesbyrd" (English: Testimony of Wrath) is the second single by Dimmu Borgir from their 2003 album Death Cult Armageddon. The song is the fourth track on the album. "Vredesbyrd" was also released as a single in 2004. The single contains, together with the radio edit of "Vredesbyrd", the radio edit of the song "Progenies of the Great Apocalypse" as well. In the CMJ New Music Report, the song was described as "testosterone pumping".

== Track listing ==
1. "Vredesbyrd" (Radio Edit) – 3:44
2. "Progenies of the Great Apocalypse" (Radio Edit) – 3:35
3. "Progenies of the Great Apocalypse" (music video) – 3:35

== Appearance ==
The song was featured and appeared on the soundtrack of the 2005 film Alone In The Dark.
