= Reno Kiilerich =

- Birth name: Reno Hilligsø Kiilerich
- Born: 21 October 1976 (age 48)
- Genres: death metal, black metal
- Occupation: drums

Reno Hilligsø Kiilerich (born October 21, 1976) is a heavy metal drummer from Denmark. Kiilerich has played with such bands as Panzerchrist, Evil Morgan, Kobeast, 12Gauge, Chthonic, Downlord, Exmortem, Hate Eternal, Strangler, Old Man's Child, Vile, Human Erupt, and Dimmu Borgir.

== Awards ==
- 2003 Fastest feet in the world at NAMM
