= Galder (artist) =

Norwegian musician (born 1976)

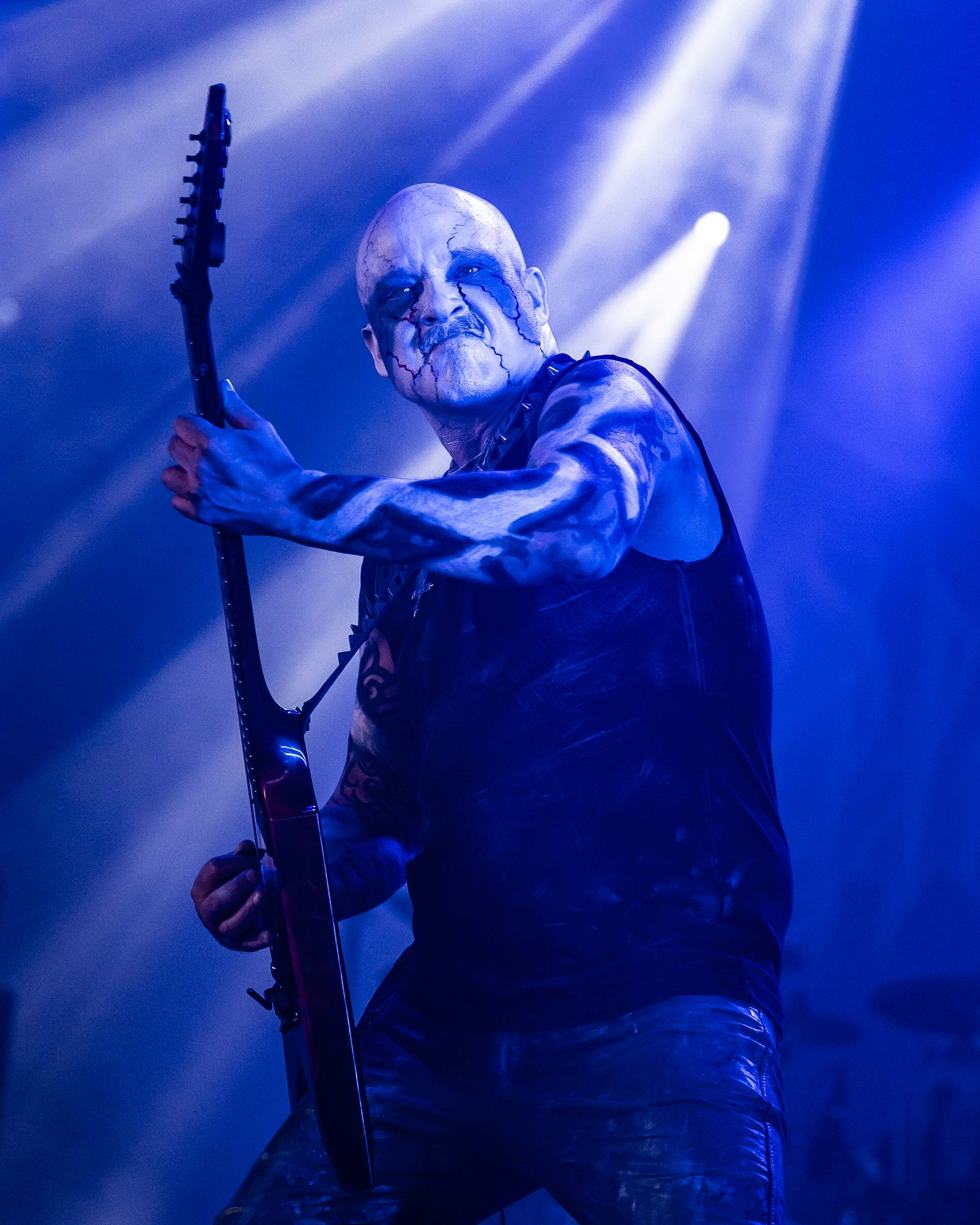
- Galder performing in 2025

Background information
- Born: Tom Rune Andersen; 18 October 1976 (age 49)
- Genres: Black metal, symphonic black metal
- Occupations: Musician, songwriter
- Instruments: Guitar, vocals, bass, keyboards
- Member of: Old Man's Child
- Formerly of: Dødheimsgard, Dimmu Borgir

Tom Rune Andersen (born 18 October 1976), also known by his stage name Galder, is a Norwegian guitarist and vocalist. He is from the small town of Jessheim, north of Oslo. He is a founding member of the melodic black metal band Old Man's Child as well as the lead guitarist of Dimmu Borgir from 2000 to 2024. In 1993, under the stage name Grusom, he, Jardar, and Tjodalv created Old Man's Child. On Old Man's Child albums, he has performed vocals, guitars, bass, and keyboards, though with a full line-up, his primary instruments are guitar and keyboards, as well as vocals. He joined Dimmu Borgir in 2000 but has kept Old Man's Child active.

Galder has also worked with other Norwegian bands such as Dødheimsgard. A member of Dødheimsgard, Aldrahn, wrote some of the lyrics for Old Man's Child's demo album In the Shades of Life.

Galder has two sons, Alex and Kevin, who are listed in the credits of Slaves of the World.

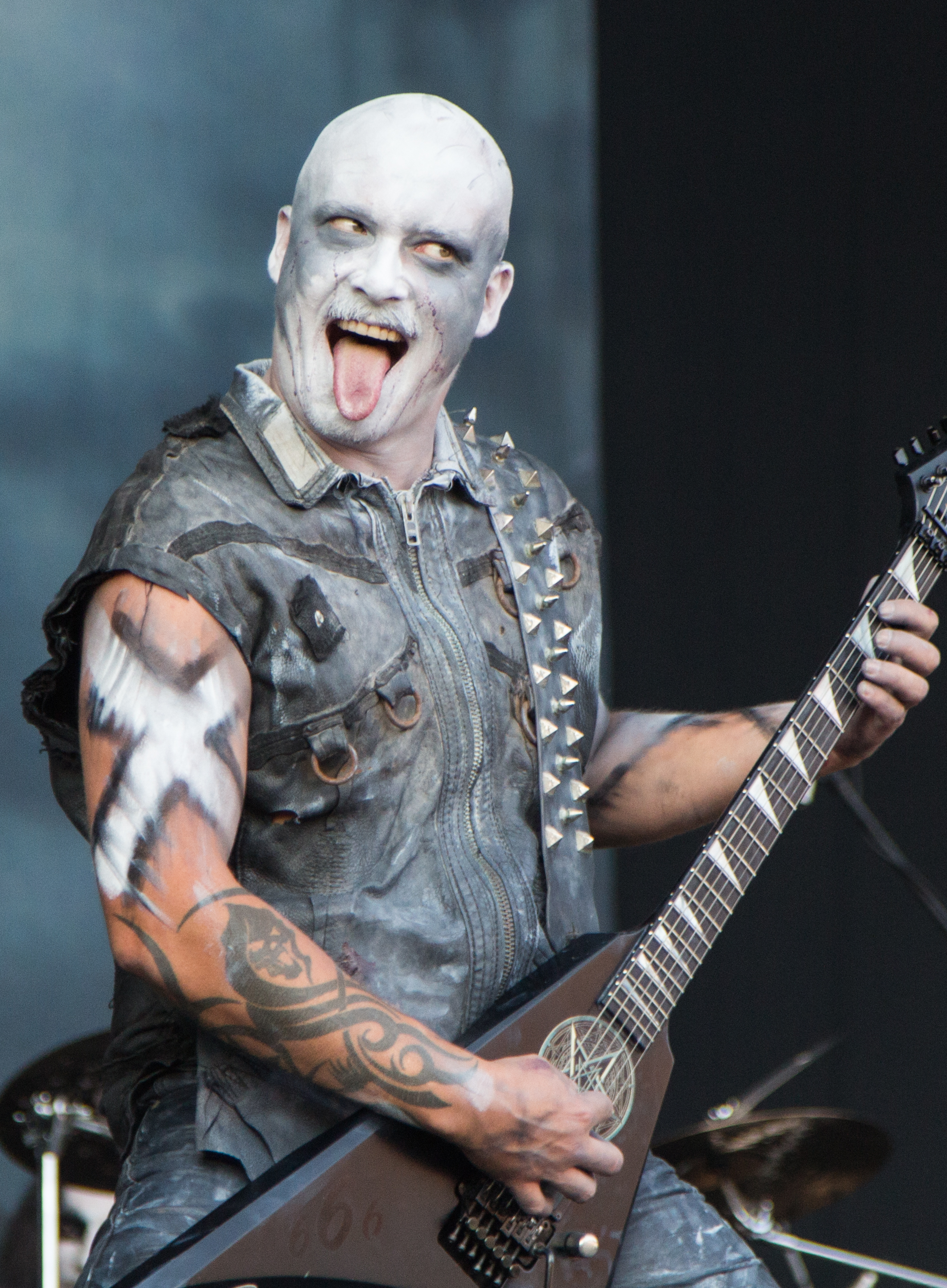
On stage in 2014

== Discography ==
With Old Man's Child

1. In the Shades of Life (1994)
2. Born of the Flickering (1996)
3. The Pagan Prosperity (1997)
4. Ill-Natured Spiritual Invasion (1998)
5. Revelation 666 – The Curse of Damnation (2000)
6. In Defiance of Existence (2003)
7. Vermin (2005)
8. Slaves of the World (2009)

With Dimmu Borgir

1. Puritanical Euphoric Misanthropia (2001)
2. World Misanthropy (2002) (DVD)
3. Death Cult Armageddon (2003)
4. In Sorte Diaboli (2007)
5. Abrahadabra (2010)
6. Forces of the Northern Night (2017)
7. Eonian (2018)

With Dødheimsgard

1. Satanic Art (1998)

== Videography ==
1. Behind the Player: Dimmu Borgir (DVD, 2010)

== Equipment ==
- ESP Galder Custom V guitar with Pentagram graphic
- Ltd Shadow Galder signature guitar
- ESP SV series, F Series, and V Series Guitars
- Jackson Guitars (former)
- Randall Amplification (former)
- Peavey Amplification
- Marshall amplifiers (former)
- ENGL amplifiers (former)
- Shure wireless systems
- D'addario strings
- Dunlop Picks with Pentagram graphic
