= The Pagan Prosperity =

Studio album by Old Man's Child
- Released: 7 October 1997
- Recorded: June 1997
- Genre: Melodic black metal
- Length: 36:32
- Label: Century Media
- Producer: J Lohngrin Cremonese

Old Man's Child chronology
Born of the Flickering (1996)	The Pagan Prosperity (1997)	Ill-Natured Spiritual Invasion (1998)

Professional ratings
Review scores
Source	Rating
Allmusic	4/5 stars

The Pagan Prosperity is the second album by black metal band Old Man's Child, released on 7 October 1997. It was recorded and mixed at Studiomega in June 1997.

== Track listing ==
All music, lyrics and arrangements by Galder.

1. "The Millennium King" – 5:28
2. "Behind the Mask" – 3:58
3. "Soul Possessed" – 4:04
4. "My Demonic Figures" – 3:59
5. "Doommaker" – 3:39
6. "My Kingdom Will Come" – 4:35
7. "Return of the Night Creatures" – 5:36
8. "What Malice Embrace" – 5:13

== Credits ==
- Galder – vocals, guitars, keyboards
- Jardar – guitars
- Gonde – bass
- Tony Kirkemo – drums
- J. Lohngrin Cremonese - Vocal tribute on "The Millennium King", "Doommaker" and "Return of the Night Creatures"

=== Additional personnel ===
- Christophe Szpajdel — logo
