= Puritanical Euphoric Misanthropia =

Studio album by Dimmu Borgir
- Released: 20 March 2001
- Recorded: October–November 2000
- Studio: Studio Fredman, Gothenburg, Sweden
- Genre: Symphonic black metal
- Length: 57:58
- Label: Nuclear Blast
- Producer: Dimmu Borgir, Fredrik Nordström

Dimmu Borgir chronology
Spiritual Black Dimensions (1999)	Puritanical Euphoric Misanthropia (2001)	Alive in Torment (2002)

Puritanical Euphoric Misanthropia is the fifth studio album by Norwegian symphonic black metal band Dimmu Borgir. It was released by Nuclear Blast Records in 2001. This is the first album to feature drummer Nick Barker, guitarist Galder, and ICS Vortex on bass. It is also the first album upon which the band used real orchestral instrumentation besides keyboards and the first of the three subsequent albums recorded in Studio Fredman in Gothenburg, Sweden, with producer Fredrik Nordström. The drum sound on this particular album strongly relies on using triggered samples, thus giving it a distinct drum machine sounding result. According to Nick Barker, the idea to this recording approach at that time was heavily inspired by his friend Hellhammer and him doing the same thing on Mayhem's album Grand Declaration of War. Specifically, the bass drum sound uses a direct sample from the beginning of "5 Minutes Alone" by Pantera off their 1994's Far Beyond Driven album. Also the exact tom drum sound used on this album was later re-used on Reaping the World Winds, debut album by Dimension F3H, which was mixed by Nordström as well.

A remixed and remastered version (again by Fredrik Nordström) of the album was released on 28 October 2022. This version features less prominent and more natural sounding drums as well as less volume on samples and keyboards among other things.

== Critical reception ==
Professional ratings
Review scores
Source	Rating
AllMusic	4/5 stars
Chronicles of Chaos	9/10
Metal.de	8/10
Rock Hard	9.0/10

AllMusic wrote, "A minority of purists might see this as too much of a departure, a complaint that would have more merit if Puritanical Euphoric Misanthropia wasn't as exquisite as it is diverse."

== Track listing ==
No.	Title	Lyrics	Music	Length
1.	"Fear and Wonder" (instrumental)		Mustis	2:48
2.	"Blessings Upon the Throne of Tyranny"	Silenoz	Galder, Silenoz, Shagrath	5:18
3.	"Kings of the Carnival Creation"	Silenoz	Mustis, Silenoz, Shagrath	7:48
4.	"Hybrid Stigmata - The Apostasy"	Silenoz	Shagrath, Silenoz, Mustis	6:57
5.	"Architecture of a Genocidal Nature"	Shagrath	Silenoz, Shagrath	6:08
6.	"Puritania"	Silenoz, Morten Lunde	Shagrath	3:06
7.	"IndoctriNation"	Silenoz	Silenoz, Shagrath, Mustis	5:57
8.	"The Maelstrom Mephisto"	Silenoz	Silenoz, Archon, Galder, Shagrath, Mustis	4:42
9.	"Absolute Sole Right"	Silenoz	Silenoz, Shagrath, Mustis	6:26
10.	"Sympozium"	Vortex	Mustis, Shagrath, Silenoz	5:13
11.	"Perfection or Vanity" (instrumental)		Shagrath	3:30

Limited Japanese Edition bonus tracks
No.	Title	Lyrics	Music	Length
12.	"Devil's Path (2000 Version)"	Shagrath	Silenoz, Shagrath	6:06
13.	"Burn in Hell" (Twisted Sister cover)	Dee Snider	Snider	5:05

=== Puritanical Euphoric Misanthropia (Remixed & Remastered) ===
No.	Title	Length
1.	"Fear and Wonder"	2:49
2.	"Blessings Upon the Throne of Tyranny"	5:23
3.	"Kings of the Carnival Creation"	7:51
4.	"Hybrid Stigmata - The Apostasy"	6:59
5.	"Architecture of a Genocidal Nature"	6:13
6.	"Puritania"	3:06
7.	"IndoctriNation"	6:01
8.	"The Maelstrom Mephisto"	4:44
9.	"Absolute Sole Right"	6:31
10.	"Sympozium"	5:13
11.	"Perfection or Vanity"	3:48
12.	"Burn in Hell" (Twisted Sister cover)	5:13
13.	"Devil's Path" (2000 Version)	6:06

Dust of Cold Memories
No.	Title	Length
1.	"Hybrid Stigmata - The Apostasy" (Preprod. Session 2000)	5:33
2.	"Blessings upon the Throne of Tyranny" (Preprod. Session 2000)	4:02
3.	"Indoctrination" (Preprod. Session 2000)	5:39
4.	"Architecture of a Genocidal Nature" (Preprod. Session 2000)	6:07
5.	"Absolute Sole Right" (Preprod. Session 2000)	6:27
6.	"Fear and Wonder" (The Kolbotn Tapes)	2:26
7.	"Blessings upon the Throne of Tyranny" (The Kolbotn Tapes)	5:39
8.	"Kings of the Carnival Creation" (The Kolbotn Tapes)	7:40
9.	"Puritania" (The Kolbotn Tapes)	2:49
10.	"The Maelstrom Mephisto" (The Kolbotn Tapes)	4:00
11.	"Sympozium" (The Kolbotn Tapes)	5:28

== Personnel ==
Dimmu Borgir

- Shagrath – lead vocals, keyboards
- Silenoz – rhythm guitar
- Galder – lead guitar
- ICS Vortex – bass guitar, clean vocals (3, 4, 8, 10, & "Burn in Hell")
- Mustis – keyboards, piano and samples
- Nicholas Barker – drums and percussion

Guest musicians

- Andy LaRocque – guitar solo on "Devil's Path" (2000 version)
- Charlie Storm – sample manipulation on "Puritania"

Gothenburg Symphony Orchestra (tracks 1–4, 6–8, & 10–11)

- Orchestration arranged and conducted by Gaute Storås
- Annica Kroon, Annika Hjelm, Bertil Lindh, Catherine Claesson, Nicola Boruvka, Per Enokson, Thore Svedlund – violins
- Henrik Edström, Nils Edin, Per Högberg – violas
- Grzegorz Wybraniec, Johan Stern – cellos
- Bo Eklund – double bass

Technical

- Fredrik Nordström – mixing, engineering
- Jan Baan – assistant engineer
- Alf Børjesson – cover concept, artwork
- Thomas Ewerhand – layout

== Charts ==
Chart	Peak position
Austrian Albums (Ö3 Austria)	23
Dutch Albums (Album Top 100)	71
Finnish Albums (Suomen virallinen lista)	11
French Albums (SNEP)	66
German Albums (Offizielle Top 100)	16
Norwegian Albums (VG-lista)	16
Polish Albums (ZPAV)	14
Swedish Albums (Sverigetopplistan)	28
UK Rock & Metal Albums (OCC)	25
UK Independent Albums (OCC)	33
