= Ill-Natured Spiritual Invasion =

Studio album by Old Man's Child
- Released: 23 June 1998
- Recorded: March – April 1998
- Genre: Melodic black metal
- Length: 35:19
- Label: Century Media Records
- Producer: Galder

Old Man's Child chronology
The Pagan Prosperity (1997)	Ill-Natured Spiritual Invasion (1998)	Revelation 666 – The Curse of Damnation (1999)

Professional ratings
Review scores
Source	Rating
Allmusic	2.5/5 stars

Ill-Natured Spiritual Invasion is the third studio album by Norwegian black metal band Old Man's Child. Most of the vocals were improvised by Galder while in the studio.

== Track listing ==
All music, lyrics and arrangements by Galder.

1. "Towards Eternity" – 5:17
2. "The Dream Ghost" – 3:41
3. "Demoniacal Possession" – 3:31
4. "Fall of Man" – 4:00
5. "Captives of Humanity" – 4:42
6. "God of Impiety" – 5:23
7. "My Evil Revelations" – 3:59
8. "Thy Servant" – 4:46

== Credits ==
- Galder – vocals, guitars, bass and synth
- Gene Hoglan – drums (incorrectly credited as Gene Hogland)

=== Additional personnel ===
- Christophe Szpajdel — logo
