= Biker metal =

Musical genre

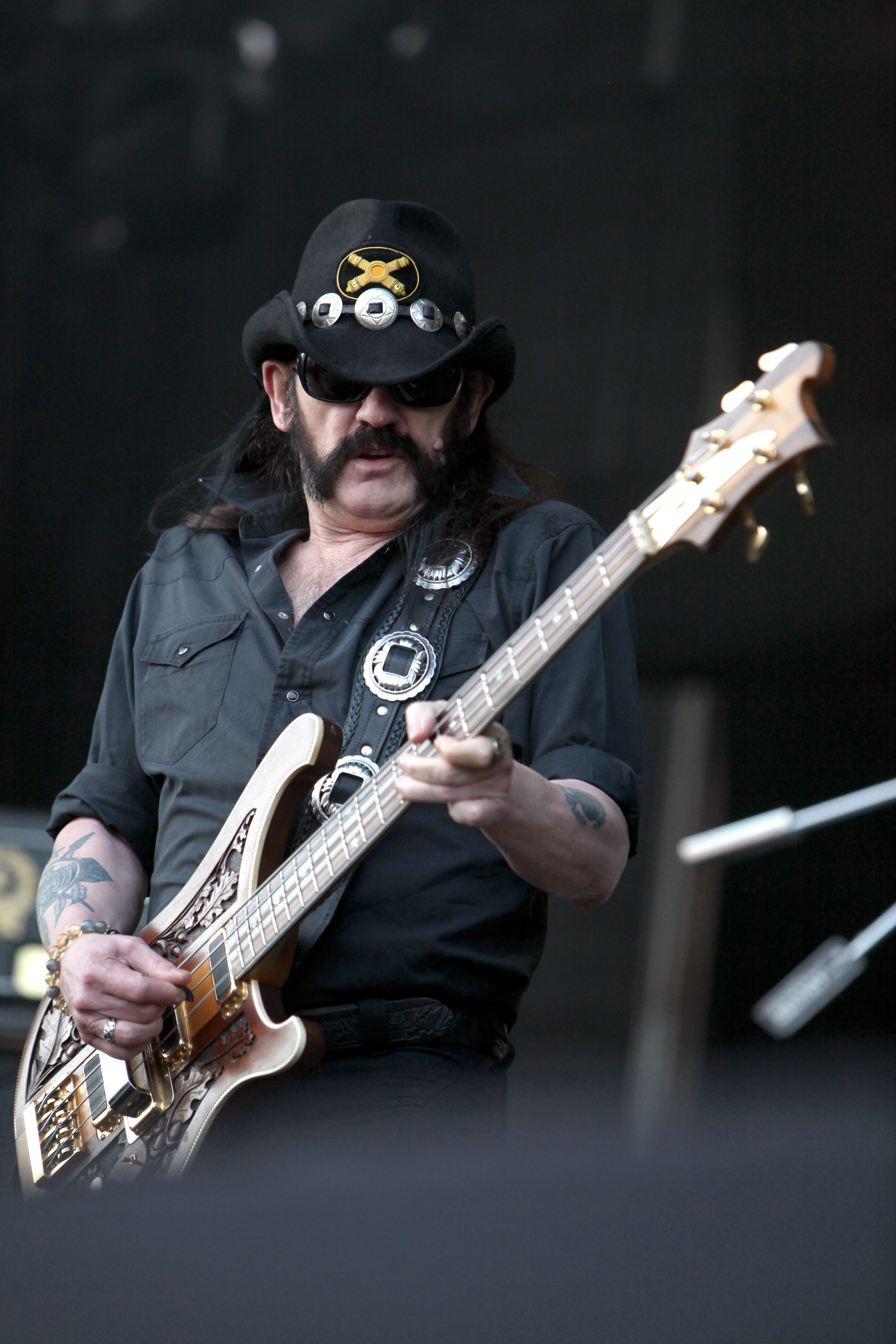
- Lemmy of biker metal band Motörhead
- Other names: Biker punk
- Stylistic origins: Punk rock; heavy metal; rock and roll; blues
- Cultural origins: England and United States, late 1970s–early 1980s
- Typical instruments: Vocals; electric guitars; electric bass guitar; drum kit
- Derivative forms: Speed metal; hardcore punk; crust punk; extreme metal

Other topics
- List of biker metal bands; glam metal; street punk; thrash metal; NWOBHM; doom metal; stoner metal; grunge; punk blues

Biker metal (also known as biker punk) is a fusion genre that combines elements of punk rock, heavy metal, rock and roll and blues, that was pioneered in the late-1970s to early-1980s in England and the United States, by Motörhead, Plasmatics, Anti-Nowhere League and Girlschool.

== Characteristics ==
Biker metal has been described as being influenced by punk rock, rock and roll, heavy metal and blues. Sleazegrinder, a writer at Classic Rock, described biker metal as "glam metal gone Mad Max".

Biker metal is characterized by its mid-tempo approach to metal, its "gritty and American" sound, and its alignment with biker culture as a whole. The genre has been contrasted with slower and more operatic forms of metal, such as Judas Priest's work in the early 2000s. Similarly, biker metal eschews the speed and virtuosity that rose to prominence in the 1980s.

Bands such as Black Moth, Orange Goblin, The Obsessed, Earthride and Black Label Society have been described as fusing the style with doom metal, whereas Clutch have been described as merging elements of biker metal and Southern rock into their stoner rock sound. Black Sabbath's song "Paranoid" has been considered a classic of the genre.

Biker metal has proven influential to genres ranging from speed metal to hardcore punk and crust punk, and was integral to the development of extreme metal. Giuseppe Sbrana of Botswanan heavy metal band Skinflint has stated that biker metal bands were heavily influential on the aesthetic of African heavy metal bands.

== Terminology ==
The association with biker culture has been present for most of heavy metal and punk rock's lifetime: Thin Lizzy were photographed frequently with motorcycles stretching as far back as 1973; Joan Jett appeared on the cover of Outlaw Biker Magazine; Judas Priest used a biker image beginning in the mid-1970s, however also borrowed heavily from sadomasochism; and the common dressing style of metalheads is closely tied to those in biker gangs. Spin hails Motörhead frontman Lemmy as the first to bring motorcycle culture into punk rock and heavy metal, likely through the influence of earlier rock bands such as Steppenwolf, Lynyrd Skynyrd and Grateful Dead. An early use of the term "heavy metal" was even present in Steppenwolf's 1968 song "Born to Be Wild", in reference to a motorcycle.

== See also ==
- List of biker metal bands
- Speed metal
- First-wave black metal
