= Tabu Recordings =

- Founded: 2003
- Distributor: Tuba Records
- Genre: Metal
- Country of origin: Norway
- Official website: www.taburec.com

Tabu Recordings is an independent Norwegian record label founded in 2003 in Oslo. It is owned by Tuba Records, a major Scandinavian independent music distributor. The label focuses on releasing products from the Norwegian metal bands.

== Bands signed with Tabu Recordings ==
- Battered
- Benea Reach
- Einherjer
- Enslaved
- Funeral
- Keep of Kalessin
- Khold
- Lumsk
- Ram-Zet
- Susperia
- Vreid
- Windir

== See also ==
- List of record labels
