= Tjodalv =

Norwegian drummer (born 1976)

- Born: Ian Kenneth Åkesson; 22 February 1976 (age 50)
- Genres: Black metal, thrash metal, industrial metal, death metal, symphonic metal, heavy metal
- Occupation: Musician
- Instruments: Drums; guitar

Ian Kenneth Åkesson (born 1976), known professionally as Tjodalv, is a Norwegian drummer. He is a founding member of the black metal bands Dimmu Borgir and Old Man's Child. He now plays in Black Comedy and Susperia. Tjodalv played guitar on the first Dimmu Borgir albums Inn i evighetens mørke and For all tid. He then switched to drumming for them on Stormblåst and continued with this until 1999. Due to his family, he left Dimmu Borgir. He was replaced by Nick Barker, formerly of Cradle of Filth.

Shortly before leaving Dimmu Borgir, he founded the group Susperia, with whom he remains active to date.

== Discography ==
With Dimmu Borgir

- Inn i evighetens mørke (1994)
- For all tid (1995)
- Stormblåst (1996)
- Enthrone Darkness Triumphant (1997)
- Godless Savage Garden (1998)
- Spiritual Black Dimensions (1999)

With Gromth

- The Immortal (2011)
- Alone (Single, 2012)

With Susperia

- Illusions of Evil (Demo, 2000)
- Predominance (2001)
- Vindication (2002)
- Unlimited (2004)
- Devil May Care (EP, 2005)
- Cut from Stone (2007)
- Attitude (2009)
- Nothing Remains (Single, 2011)
