= Century Media Records =

German record label

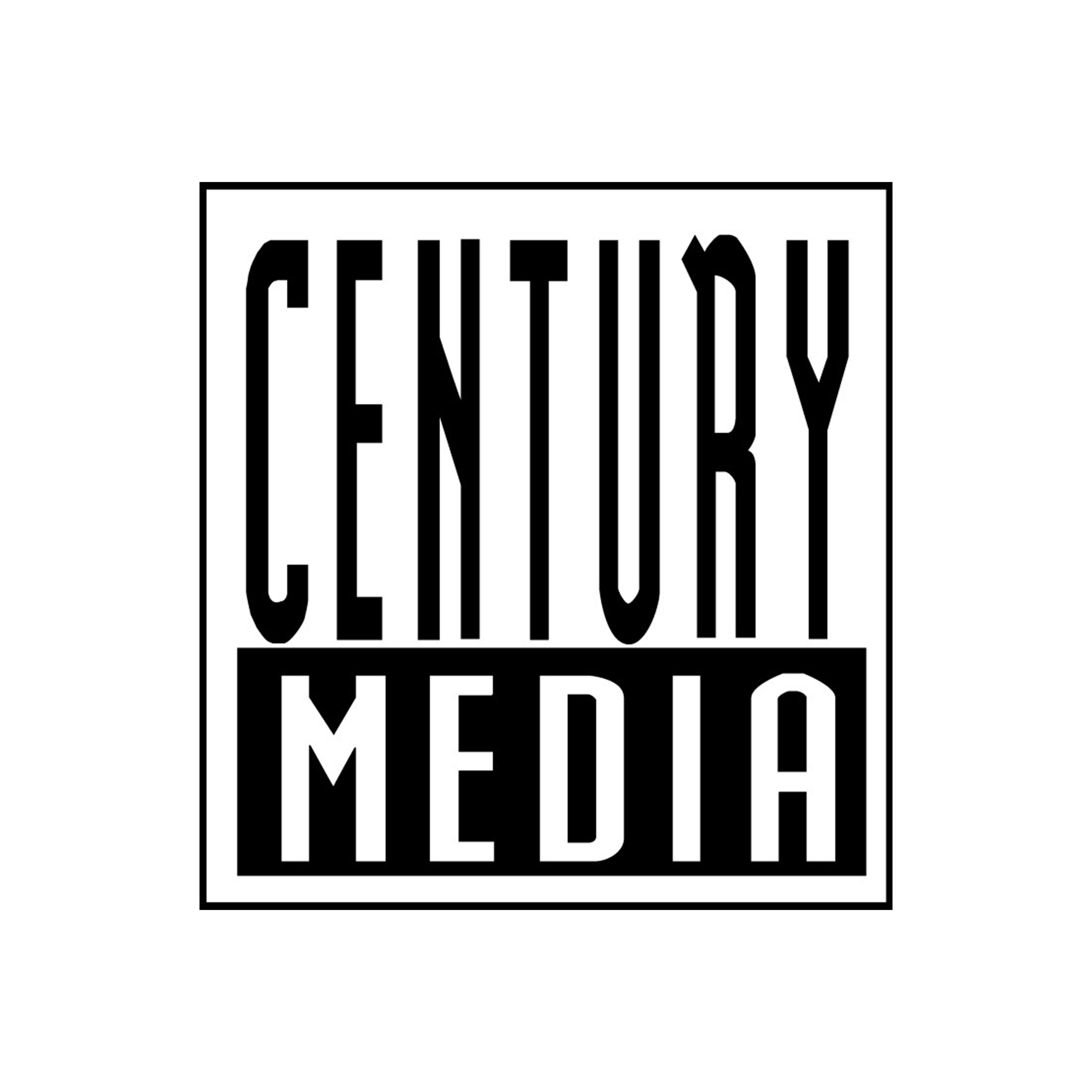
- Parent company: Sony Music Entertainment
- Founded: 1988; 38 years ago
- Founder: Robert Kampf; Oliver Withöft
- Status: Active
- Distributors: Self-distributed (Germany); The Orchard (US); Sony Music; (International)
- Genre: Heavy metal; extreme metal; hard rock; hardcore punk
- Country of origin: Germany
- Location: Dortmund, Germany (headquarters)
- Official website: centurymedia.com cmdistro.com

Century Media Records is a German heavy metal record label with offices in Germany, the United States and the United Kingdom. In August 2015, Century Media was acquired by Sony Music for US$17 million.

== Background ==
Century Media was founded by Robert Kampf and Oliver Withöft in Dortmund, Germany, in 1988 and has gone on to launch or further the careers of bands such as Grave, Samael, Tiamat, Unleashed, Asphyx, Architects, Butcher Babies, Devin Townsend, Diecast, Divine Heresy, Eyehategod, God Forbid, Iced Earth, In This Moment, Lacuna Coil, Moonspell, Nevermore, Shadows Fall, Suicide Silence, Warbringer, Winds of Plague and Skinlab. The label specializes in many different styles of heavy metal music. A number of artists listed are licensed to Century Media for the American market from labels mostly based in Europe. Century Media is also home to Arch Enemy, Lorna Shore, Napalm Death, Orbit Culture, and Queensrÿche.

Shadows Fall experienced its greatest success during its time with the label. Iconic hardcore punk band Sick of It All also resides in the Century Media family. Lacuna Coil's 2002 album, Comalies, became Century Media's first act to crack the Billboard 200 album chart, peaking at No. 178 two years after its release. Their fourth album, Karmacode, improved on that achievement, having sold over 490,000 copies since its release, and peaking at No. 28 on the U.S. Billboard Album Chart. It hit number one on the Top Independent Albums Chart. Shadows Fall's 2004 album, The War Within, set a new milestone for the label with a Top 20 debut on the Billboard 200 and also debuted at number one on the Independent Albums chart, having sold over 300,000 copies since its release. Other notable artists on the label that have also made appearances on the Billboard 200 include In This Moment, Arch Enemy, Stuck Mojo, Nightrage, Behemoth, Strapping Young Lad, Suicide Silence, and God Forbid. The Finnish metal band Sentenced was awarded on August 14, 2008, for its platinum Buried Alive live DVD released by Century Media. In April 2009, the label announced that it were extending its existing distribution deal with EMI, which had been distributing its releases in the United States since 1997, and in Europe since 2005, to include Australasia. Since being bought out by Sony Music in August 2015, the label's releases are distributed worldwide by Sony Music while RED is distributing the label's releases in the U.S.

On June 7, 2017, Century Media sold its music publishing catalogue to Reservoir Media Management.

== Another Century ==
In late 2014 Robert Kampf, founder of Century Media Records, launched a new hard rock-focused label named Another Century. This label is leaning away from straight-up metal of Century Media and looking to make a name for itself as a premiere hard rock label. Kampf, who started Century Media Records back in 1988, said in a statement that it's his, "undying love for rock" that led to the formation of the new label, and he hopes to, "develop and break the best bands in rock."

Robert Kampf was quoted on his new label: Twenty five years after starting Century Media the excitement to do another version of the label could not be any larger. My undying love for rock has driven the formation of this label ANOTHER CENTURY. Over the years great bands like Otherwise and In This Moment have been released on Century Media but sometimes got lost or felt ill mixed among some of the heavier CM bands. Another Century now has a clear path and mission statement: To develop and break the best bands in rock to come!

The label has since acquired breakout bands New Years Day, XO Stereo, Like a Storm, Awaken the Empire, and Stitched Up Heart.

Adrenaline Mob and Fozzy, both of whom have released albums on Century Media, are listed on the Artists page of the new Another Century website.

== Century Black ==
In the mid to late 1990s, Century Media launched an imprint called Century Black, often described as "the Miramax Films of black metal", releasing or re-releasing hard-to-find black metal albums from foreign bands, which normally would have been nearly impossible to find in America. Usually, those records had been released by smaller European labels, such as Malicious Records or Candlelight Records. Century Black was founded by Rayshele Teige, who also served as A&R for Century Black and had been a publicist for Century Media Records. Teige was also in charge of the American distribution arm for Osmose Productions and later went on to spearhead the American office for Prophecy Productions. By 2000, the Century Black imprint was discontinued as several of its bands had signed with other American metal record labels, or had signed deals with Century Media Records and became part of the "Century Family".

== Abacus Recordings ==
Abacus Recordings was an imprint of Century Media created in 2002, signing mostly metalcore bands. On July 24, 2007, it was reported that Abacus Recordings had been absorbed into Century Media, who had previously distributed Abacus' releases.

== Spotify controversy ==
In August 2011, Century Media decided to pull all of their acts from Spotify, an online music streaming service, citing this as "an attempt to protect the interests of their artists". Metal blog MetalSucks criticized Century Media in a post, which was later replied to by the label in an email. On July 30, 2012, Century Media Records made their entire catalog available on Spotify again after "impressive debates and messages from fans" and discussions with Spotify.

== Death of Oliver Withöft ==
On January 21, 2014, it was reported that co-owner Oliver Withöft had died after a long period of illness. Tributes were paid to him by Monte Conner, head of US A&R for Nuclear Blast Records, Nachtmystium's Blake Judd and Sumerian Records publicist George Vallee (a former employee of Century Media), among others.

== See also ==
- List of record labels
- List of Century Media Records artists
- List of Century Black Albums
