= List of Dimmu Borgir members =

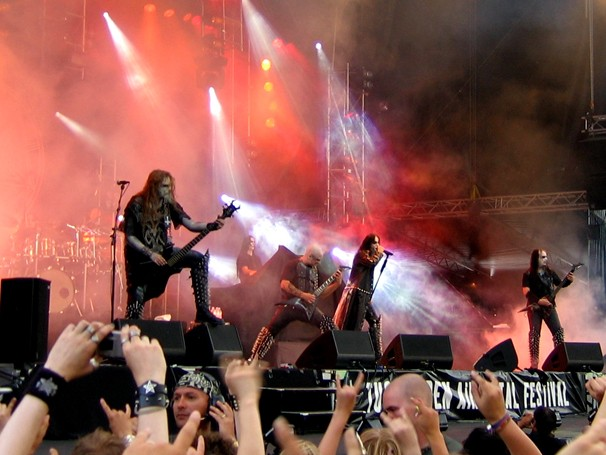
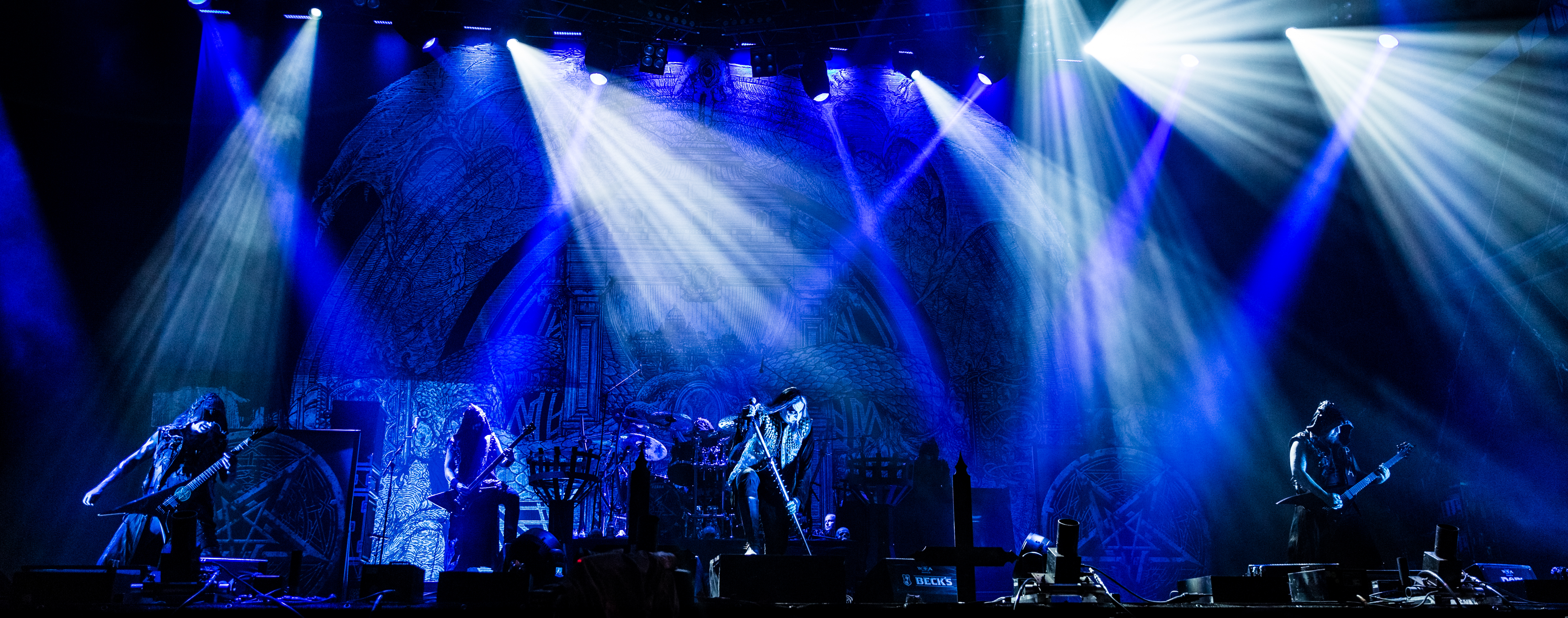
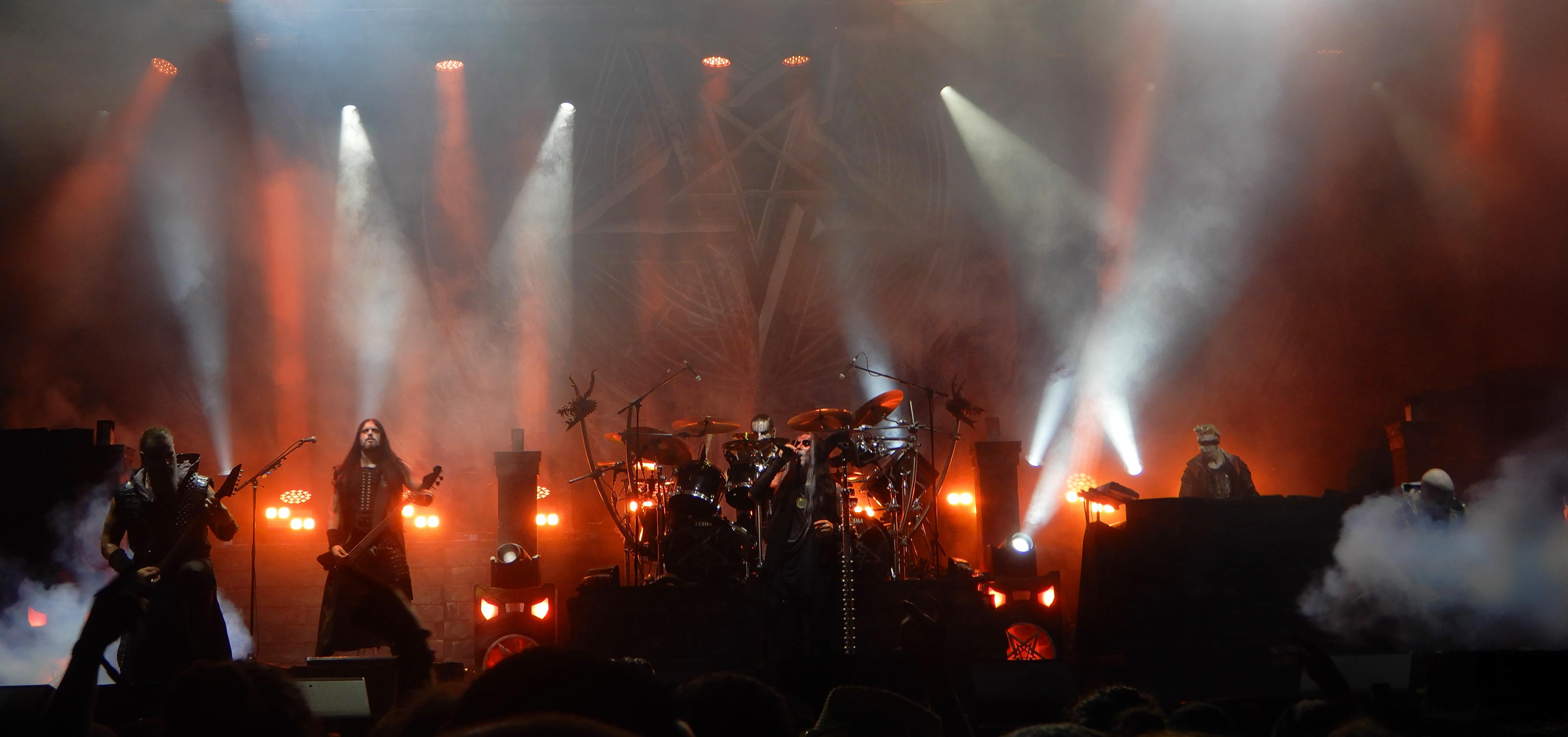
Two lineups of Dimmu Borgir performing in 2005, 2018 and 2025

Dimmu Borgir is a Norwegian symphonic black metal band from Jessheim. Formed in 1993, the group was originally a trio which featured Sven Atle "Erkekjetter Silenoz" Kopperud on lead vocals and rhythm guitar, Ian Kenneth "Tjodalv" Åkesson on lead guitar, and Stian Tomt "Shagrath" Thoresen on drums. They were soon joined by bassist Ivar "Brynjard" Tristan and keyboardist Stian Aarstad. The band's current lineup is officially a duo comprising Shagrath on lead vocals and Silenoz on rhythm guitar. They are joined by backup members Dariusz "Daray" Brzozowski on drums (since 2008), Geir "Gerlioz" Bratland on keyboards (since 2010), Victor Brandt on bass (since 2018) and Kjell Åge "Damage" Karlsen on lead guitar (since 2025).

== History ==
=== 1993–1999 ===
Silenoz, Tjodalv and Shagrath formed Dimmu Borgir in 1993, finalising the band's initial lineup with the addition of Tristan and Aarstad shortly thereafter. After the group released several early demos and its debut album For all tid, Tjodalv and Shagrath switched roles in the lineup. Shortly after the release of the band's second album Stormblåst, Tristan was replaced by Stian "Nagash" Hinderson for the recording of the Devil's Path EP. Enthrone Darkness Triumphant followed in early 1997, the tour for which saw the addition of Jamie "Astennu" Stinson on lead guitar.

During the tour in promotion of Enthrone Darkness Triumphant, Aarstad was fired from Dimmu Borgir after failing to show up for the band's performance at Dynamo Open Air in May 1997. He was temporarily replaced by Kimberly Goss, most recently of Therion, for the remainder of the cycle. Early the next year, Øyvind Johan "Mustis" Mustaparta took over full-time. After the recording of 1999's Spiritual Black Dimensions, both Tjodalv and Nagash left Dimmu Borgir. They were replaced on the subsequent tour by Nick Barker and Simen "ICS Vortex" Hestnæs, respectively.

=== 1999–2007 ===
At the end of 1999, Astennu was fired from Dimmu Borgir, which Barker claimed was due to his lack of interest in the band. He was replaced initially early the next year by Lars Archon, before Tom Rune "Galder" Anderson took over in the summer. The lineup of Shagrath, Galder, Silenoz, Vortex, Mustis and Barker remained stable for several years, releasing the albums Puritanical Euphoric Misanthropia, World Misanthropy and Death Cult Armageddon. In January 2004, Barker was dismissed from the band, which he suggested was likely due to the fact that he lived in a different country.

Despite an early rumour that Barker's place had been taken by Asgeir Mickelson, a bandmate of ICS Vortex's in Borknagar, it was announced in March that the new temporary touring drummer was Reno Kiilerich, most notably of Panzerchrist. After he was unable to obtain a US visa in time for the tour, the drummer was replaced for Ozzfest in the summer by Tony Laureano of Nile. Laureano remained for live shows the following summer, while Mayhem drummer Jan Axel "Hellhammer" Blomberg was brought in to record Stormblåst MMV as a guest session contributor.

=== Since 2007 ===
Hellhammer continued working with Dimmu Borgir for the album In Sorte Diaboli and subsequent tour dates, although he never became an official band member. When he broke his arm in June 2007, he was replaced by the returning Tony Laureano. By October 2008, he had been replaced in the touring lineup by former Vader drummer Dariusz "Daray" Brzozowski. At the end of August 2009, long-term members ICS Vortex and Mustis were both dismissed. The remaining band members later claimed that the pair had displayed "unprofessionalism and bad live performances for years".

In 2010, Vortex and Mustis were replaced by Tommie "Snowy Shaw" Helgesson and Geir "Gerlioz" Bratland, respectively, although both were credited as guest performers (alongside Daray) and the band's frontman Shagrath confirmed that only he, Silenoz and Galder were official members of the group. Shaw left in August and was replaced on tour by Susperia guitarist Terje "Cyrus" Andersen. He remained until May 2018, when he was replaced by Victor Brandt (of Firespawn and formerly of Entombed A.D.).

On August 18, 2024, Galder announced via his Instagram account that he had left Dimmu Borgir, playing his last show the day before at Dynamo Metal Fest. In June 2025, the band announced Kjell Åge "Damage" Karlsen (of Chrome Division) as new lead guitarist.

== Members ==
=== Current ===
Image	Name	Years active	Instruments	Release contributions
	Shagrath (Stian Tomt Thoresen)	1993–present	vocals (lead since 1996); drums (1993–95); lead guitar (1995–97); keyboards and bass (1993, occasionally since 2008)	all Dimmu Borgir releases
	Erkekjetter Silenoz (Sven Atle Kopperud)	1993–present	rhythm guitar; lead vocals (1993–96); bass (1993, occasionally since 2009)	all Dimmu Borgir releases

=== Former ===
Image	Name	Years active	Instruments	Release contributions
	Tjodalv (Ian Kenneth Åkesson)	1993–1999 (guest 2024)	lead guitar (1993–95); drums and percussion (1995–99)	all Dimmu Borgir releases from Rehearsal January 1994 (1994) to Spiritual Black Dimensions (1999); World Misanthropy (2002); Live at Dynamo Open Air 1998 (2019)
	Stian Aarstad	1993–1997	keyboards; synthesizers	all Dimmu Borgir releases from Rehearsal January 1994 (1994) to Live & Plugged, Vol. 2 (1997), except Devil's Path (1996)
	Brynjard Tristan (Ivar Tristan Lundsten)	1993–1996	bass	all Dimmu Borgir releases from Rehearsal January 1994 (1994) to Stormblåst (1996)
	Nagash (Stian André Hinderson)	1996–1999	bass; backing vocals; lead guitar (studio 1997)	all Dimmu Borgir releases from Devil's Path (1996) to Spiritual Black Dimensions (1999); World Misanthropy (2002); Live at Dynamo Open Air 1998 (2019)
	Astennu (Jamie Stinson)	1997–1999	lead guitar	Live & Plugged, Vol. 2 (1997); Godless Savage Garden (1998); Spiritual Black Dimensions (1999); World Misanthropy (2002); Live at Dynamo Open Air 1998 (2019)
	Mustis (Øyvind Johan Mustaparta)	1998–2009 (guest 2024)	keyboards; synthesizers; piano; samples	all Dimmu Borgir releases from Godless Savage Garden (1998) to The Invaluable Darkness (2008); Live at Dynamo Open Air 1998 (2019)
	ICS Vortex (Simen Hestnæs)	1999–2009 (guest 2024)	bass; clean vocals	all Dimmu Borgir releases from Spiritual Black Dimensions (1999) to The Invaluable Darkness (2008), except Stormblåst MMV (2005)
	Nick Barker	1999–2004	drums; percussion	all Dimmu Borgir releases from Puritanical Euphoric Misanthropia (2001) to Death Cult Armageddon (2003)
	Lars Archon	2000	lead guitar	none
	Galder (Thomas Rune Anderson)	2000–2024	lead guitar; bass (occasionally since 2009)	all Dimmu Borgir releases from Puritanical Euphoric Misanthropia (2001) to Inspiratio Profanus (2023), except Stormblåst MMV (2005) and Live at Dynamo Open Air 1998 (2019)

=== Touring ===
Image	Name	Years active	Instruments	Details
	Kimberly Goss	1997–1998	keyboards; synthesizers	Goss temporarily toured with Dimmu Borgir after Stian Aarstad was fired from the band in May 1997.
	Aggressor (Carl-Michael Eide)	1997 (substitute)	drums	Aggressor briefly substituted for Tjodalv in 1997, after he took a sabbatical to be with his newborn child.
	Reno Kiilerich	2004	drums	After Nick Barker was dismissed in January 2004, Kiilerich briefly joined as a touring replacement.
	Tony Laureano	2004–2005; 2007–2008	drums	Laureano took over from Kiilerich due to a visa issue, then from Hellhammer after he broke his arm.
	Hellhammer (Jan Axel Blomberg)	2005–2007	drums	Stormblåst MMV (2005); In Sorte Diaboli (2007)
	Daray (Dariusz Brzozowski)	2008–present	drums	Abrahadabra (2010); Forces of the Northern Night (2017); Eonian (2018); Grand Serpent Rising (2026)
	Secthdamon	2007 (substitute)	bass	Secthdamon handled the live bass on Dimmu Borgir's European Tour in 2007, when ICS Vortex was not able to play.
	Gerlioz (Geir Bratland)	2010–present	keyboards; synthesizers	Abrahadabra (2010); Forces of the Northern Night (2017); Eonian (2018); Grand Serpent Rising (2026)
	Snowy Shaw (Tommie Mike Christer Helgesson)	2010	bass; clean vocals	Abrahadabra (2010)
	Cyrus (Terje Andersen)	2010–2014 (substitute in 2008)	bass; lead guitar (2008)	Forces of the Northern Night (2017)
	Victor Brandt	2018–present	bass	Grand Serpent Rising (2026)
	Damage (Kjell Åge Karlsen)	2025–present	lead guitar	Grand Serpent Rising (2026)

== Timelines ==
=== Recording ===
Album	Lead vocals	Lead guitar	Rhythm guitar	Bass	Keyboards	Drums	Clean vocals
Inn i evighetens mørke (1994)	Silenoz	Tjodalv	Silenoz	Brynjard Tristan	Stian Aarstad	Shagrath	none
For all tid (1995)	Silenoz	Tjodalv	Silenoz	Brynjard Tristan	Stian Aarstad	Shagrath	Aldrahn (1 track)
Stormblåst (1996)	Silenoz	Shagrath	Silenoz	Brynjard Tristan	Stian Aarstad	Tjodalv	none
Devil's Path (1996)	Shagrath	Shagrath	Silenoz	Nagash	Shagrath	Tjodalv	none
Enthrone Darkness Triumphant (1997)	Shagrath	Shagrath	Silenoz	Nagash	Stian Aarstad	Tjodalv	none
Godless Savage Garden (1998)	Shagrath	Astennu	Silenoz	Nagash	Stian Aarstad (5 tracks); Mustis (3 tracks)	Tjodalv	none
Spiritual Black Dimensions (1999)	Shagrath	Astennu	Silenoz	Nagash	Mustis	Tjodalv	ICS Vortex
Puritanical Euphoric Misanthropia (2001)	Shagrath	Galder	Silenoz	ICS Vortex	Mustis	Nick Barker	ICS Vortex
Death Cult Armageddon (2003)	Shagrath	Galder	Silenoz	ICS Vortex	Mustis	Nick Barker	ICS Vortex
Stormblåst MMV (2005)	Shagrath	Shagrath	Silenoz	Shagrath	Mustis	Hellhammer	none
In Sorte Diaboli (2007)	Shagrath	Galder	Silenoz	ICS Vortex	Mustis	Hellhammer	ICS Vortex
Abrahadabra (2010)	Shagrath	Galder	Silenoz	Snowy Shaw	Shagrath/Gerlioz	Daray	Snowy Shaw (3 tracks) Agnete Kjølsrud (1 track) Garm (1 track)
Eonian (2018)	Shagrath	Galder	Silenoz	Shagrath/Galder/Silenoz	Shagrath/Gerlioz	Daray	none
Grand Serpent Rising (2026)	Shagrath	Kjell Åge Karlsen	Silenoz	Victor Brandt	Shagrath/Gerlioz	Daray	none

== Lineups ==
Period	Members	Releases
1993	Shagrath – drums, additional vocals, bass, keyboards; Silenoz – lead vocals, rhythm guitar, bass; Tjodalv – lead guitar, additional drums	none
1993 – summer 1995	Shagrath – drums, additional vocals; Silenoz – lead vocals, rhythm guitar; Tjodalv – lead guitar, additional drums; Brynjard Tristan – bass; Stian Aarstad – keyboards, synthesizers	Rehearsal January 1994 (1994); Rehearsal February 1994 (1994); Rehearsal August 1994 (1994); Inn i evighetens mørke (1994); For all tid (1995)
Summer 1995 – early 1996	Shagrath – lead guitar, additional vocals; Silenoz – lead vocals, rhythm guitar; Tjodalv – drums, percussion; Brynjard Tristan – bass; Stian Aarstad – keyboards, synthesizers	Stormblåst (1996)
Early 1996 – early 1997	Shagrath – lead guitar, lead vocals; Silenoz – rhythm guitar; Tjodalv – drums, percussion; Stian Aarstad – keyboards, synthesizers; Nagash – bass, backing vocals	Devil's Path (1996) (does not feature Stian Aarstad); Enthrone Darkness Triumphant (1997)
March – May 1997	Shagrath – lead vocals; Silenoz – rhythm guitar; Tjodalv – drums, percussion; Stian Aarstad – keyboards, synthesizers; Nagash – bass, backing vocals; Astennu – lead guitar	Live & Plugged, Vol. 2 (1997); Godless Savage Garden (1998) – five tracks
Summer 1997 – early 1998	Shagrath – lead vocals; Silenoz – rhythm guitar; Tjodalv – drums, percussion; Nagash – bass, backing vocals; Astennu – lead guitar	none
Early 1998 – March 1999	Shagrath – lead vocals; Silenoz – rhythm guitar; Tjodalv – drums, percussion; Nagash – bass, backing vocals; Astennu – lead guitar; Mustis – keyboards, synthesizers	Godless Savage Garden (1998) – three tracks; Spiritual Black Dimensions (1999); Live at Dynamo Open Air 1998 (2019)
March – late 1999	Shagrath – lead vocals; Silenoz – rhythm guitar; Astennu – lead guitar; Mustis – keyboards, synthesizers; ICS Vortex – bass, clean vocals; Nick Barker – drums, percussion	none
Late 1999 – summer 2000	Shagrath – lead vocals; Silenoz – rhythm guitar; Mustis – keyboards, synthesizers; ICS Vortex – bass, clean vocals; Nick Barker – drums, percussion; Lars Archon – lead guitar	none
Summer 2000 – January 2004	Shagrath – lead vocals; Silenoz – rhythm guitar; Mustis – keyboards, synthesizers; ICS Vortex – bass, clean vocals; Nick Barker – drums, percussion; Galder – lead guitar	Puritanical Euphoric Misanthropia (2001); Alive in Torment (2002); World Misanthropy (2002); Death Cult Armageddon (2003)
March – July 2004	Shagrath – lead vocals; Silenoz – rhythm guitar; Mustis – keyboards, synthesizers; ICS Vortex – bass, clean vocals; Galder – lead guitar; Reno Kiilerich – drums (touring)	none
July 2004 – April 2005	Shagrath – lead vocals; Silenoz – rhythm guitar; Mustis – keyboards, synthesizers; ICS Vortex – bass, clean vocals; Galder – lead guitar; Tony Laureano – drums (touring)	none
April – August 2005	Shagrath – lead vocals; Silenoz – rhythm guitar; Mustis – keyboards, synthesizers; ICS Vortex – bass, clean vocals; Galder – lead guitar; Tony Laureano – drums (touring); Hellhammer – drums (session)	Stormblåst MMV (2005) (does not feature Galder or ICS Vortex)
August 2005 – June 2007	Shagrath – lead vocals; Silenoz – rhythm guitar; Mustis – keyboards, synthesizers; ICS Vortex – bass, clean vocals; Galder – lead guitar; Hellhammer – drums (session and touring)	In Sorte Diaboli (2007)
June 2007 – October 2008	Shagrath – lead vocals; Silenoz – rhythm guitar; Mustis – keyboards, synthesizers; ICS Vortex – bass, clean vocals; Galder – lead guitar; Tony Laureano – drums (touring)	The Invaluable Darkness (2008)
October 2008 – August 2009	Shagrath – lead vocals; Silenoz – rhythm guitar; Mustis – keyboards, synthesizers; ICS Vortex – bass, clean vocals; Galder – lead guitar; Daray – drums (session and touring)	none
Early – August 2010	Shagrath – lead vocals, bass, keyboards; Silenoz – rhythm guitar, bass; Galder – lead guitar, bass; Daray – drums (session and touring); Gerlioz – keyboards (session and touring); Snowy Shaw – bass, vocals (session and touring)	Abrahadabra (2010)
September 2010 – August 2014	Shagrath – lead vocals, bass, keyboards; Silenoz – rhythm guitar, bass; Galder – lead guitar, bass; Daray – drums (session and touring); Gerlioz – keyboards (session and touring); Cyrus – bass (session and touring)	Forces of the Northern Night (2017)
August 2014 – May 2018	Shagrath – lead vocals, bass, keyboards; Silenoz – rhythm guitar, bass; Galder – lead guitar, bass; Daray – drums (session and touring); Gerlioz – keyboards (session and touring)	Eonian (2018)
May 2018 – August 2024	Shagrath – lead vocals, bass, keyboards; Silenoz – rhythm guitar, bass; Galder – lead guitar, bass; Daray – drums (session and touring); Gerlioz – keyboards (session and touring); Victor Brandt – bass (session and touring)	none
August 2024 – June 2025	Shagrath – lead vocals, bass, keyboards; Silenoz – rhythm guitar, bass; Daray – drums (session and touring); Gerlioz – keyboards (session and touring); Victor Brandt – bass (session and touring)	none
June 2025 – present	Shagrath – lead vocals, bass, keyboards; Silenoz – rhythm guitar, bass; Daray – drums (session and touring); Gerlioz – keyboards (session and touring); Victor Brandt – bass (session and touring); Damage – lead guitar (session and touring)	Grand Serpent Rising (2026)
