= Dimmu Borgir discography =

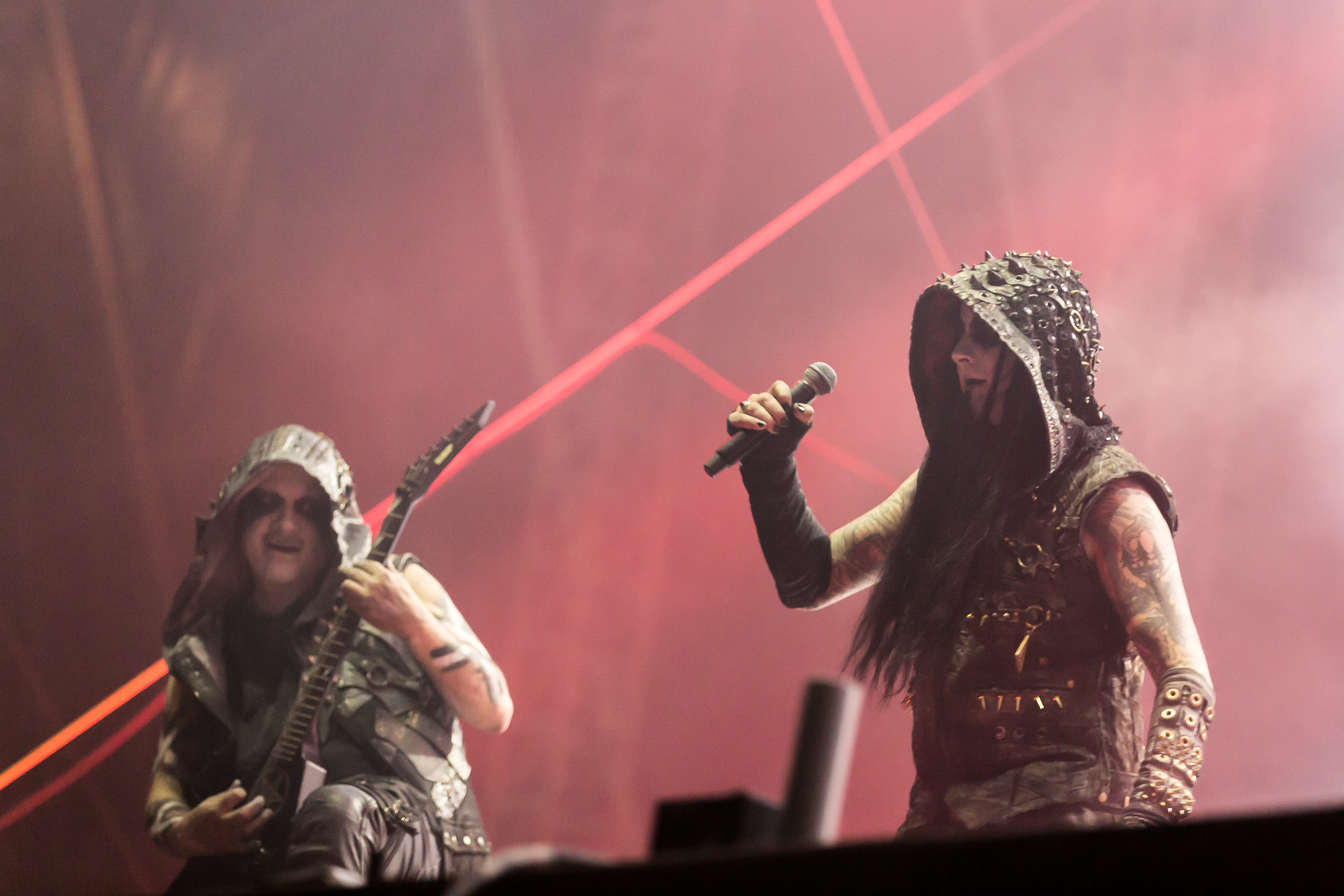
- Dimmu Borgir at Rockharz Open Air 2019
- Studio albums: 10
- Extended plays: 4
- Compilation albums: 2
- Singles: 6
- Video albums: 3
- Music videos: 15

The discography of Dimmu Borgir, a Norwegian symphonic black metal band, consists of ten studio albums, four extended plays, one compilation album, six singles and three music videos.

Dimmu Borgir was formed in 1993 by Shagrath, Silenoz, and Tjodalv in Oslo, Norway and released their first extended play, Inn i evighetens mørke (English: Into Eternal Darkness), in 1995 shortly followed by their debut studio album, For all tid (English: For All Time), in the same year. One year later, in 1996, they released their second studio album Stormblåst (English: Stormblown) under Cacophonous and was their final album sung entirely in Norwegian until its re-recording in 2005 under Nuclear Blast. The band's first release under Nuclear Blast was their third studio album Enthrone Darkness Triumphant and was also their first album to make it into the charts; peaking in its seventh week in the Finnish charts at number 26 and debuting in the German charts at number 75. Before the release of their fourth studio album, Spiritual Black Dimensions; in 1999, Dimmu Borgir released the compilation album Godless Savage Garden to, according to the band, "hold fans over while waiting for the next full-length, Spiritual Black Dimensions." Two years later, in 2001, they released their fifth studio album, Puritanical Euphoric Misanthropia, and a further two years later their sixth and first album to chart in the United States; Death Cult Armageddon. In 2005 the band released the rerecording of their second studio album under the title Stormblåst MMV followed by their first concept album In Sorte Diaboli, in 2007, which debuted in at number one in the Norwegian album charts and at number 43 in the Billboard 200, making them the first Norwegian band since a-ha to crack the United States Top 50. As of 2010, Dimmu Borgir had sold over 400,000 albums in the United States.

== Albums ==
=== Studio albums ===
Title	Album details	Peak chart positions											Sales	Certifications
Title	Album details	NOR	AUT	CHE	FIN	FRA	GER	NLD	SWE	US	JPN	UK	Sales	Certifications
For all tid	Released: 15 March 1995; Label: No Colours; Format: CD, CS, LP, DL	—	—	—	—	—	—	—	—	—	—	—		
Stormblåst	Released: 25 January 1996; Label: Cacophonous; Format: CD, CS, LP, DL	—	—	—	—	—	—	—	—	—	—	—		
Enthrone Darkness Triumphant	Released: 30 May 1997; Label: Nuclear Blast; Format: CD, CS, LP, DL	—	—	—	26	—	75	—	—	—	—	—	US: 7,098+; WW: 300,000+	
Spiritual Black Dimensions	Released: 2 March 1999; Label: Nuclear Blast; Format: CD, CS, LP, DL	18	31	—	14	—	25	98	44	—	—	—	US: 7,914+	
Puritanical Euphoric Misanthropia	Released: 20 March 2001; Label: Nuclear Blast; Format: CD, CS, LP, DL	16	23	—	11	66	16	71	28	—	—	192		
Death Cult Armageddon	Released: 9 September 2003; Label: Nuclear Blast; Format: CD, CS, LP, DVD-A, DL	2	14	54	9	35	12	42	28	170	—	125	US: 130,000+; WW: 500,000+	
In Sorte Diaboli	Released: 24 April 2007; Label: Nuclear Blast; Format: CD, CD+DVD, LP, DL	1	11	30	6	34	7	37	10	43	131	143	US: 75,000+; NOR: 15,000+	NOR: Gold
Abrahadabra	Released: 12 October 2010; Label: Nuclear Blast; Format: CD, LP, DL	2	20	24	8	43	15	100	17	42	—	117	US: 9,400 (1st week)	
Eonian	Released: 4 May 2018; Label: Nuclear Blast; Format: CD, CS, LP, DL	2	10	5	4	33	4	64	32	142	158	73		
Grand Serpent Rising	Released: 22 May 2026; Label: Nuclear Blast; Format: CD, LP, DL	11	5	4	5	—	6	41	57	—	—	—		
"—" denotes releases that did not chart.

=== Re-recorded albums ===
Title	Album details	Peak chart positions				Sales
Title	Album details	NOR	FRA	GER	US Ind.	Sales
Stormblåst MMV	Released: 11 November 2005; Label: Nuclear Blast; Format: CD, CD+DVD, LP, DL	24	183	87	38	US: 3,000 (1st week)

=== Compilation albums ===
Title	Album details	Peak chart positions			
Title	Album details	AUT	FIN	GER	NLD
Godless Savage Garden	Released: 4 August 1998; Label: Nuclear Blast; Format: CD, CS, LP, DL	47	25	56	98
Inspiratio Profanus	Released: 8 December 2023; Label: Nuclear Blast; Format: CD, LP	—	—	—	—

== Extended plays ==
Title	Album details
Inn i evighetens mørke	Released: 17 December 1994; Label: Necromantic Gallery Productions; Formats: LP
Devil's Path	Released: 19 June 1996; Label: Hot Records; Formats: CD
Alive in Torment	Released: 26 February 2002; Label: Nuclear Blast; Formats: CD, DL

== Singles ==
Year	Title	Album
2003	"Progenies of the Great Apocalypse"	Death Cult Armageddon
2003	"Vredesbyrd"	Death Cult Armageddon
2007	"The Serpentine Offering"	In Sorte Diaboli
2007	"The Sacrilegious Scorn"	In Sorte Diaboli
2010	"Gateways"	Abrahadabra
2018	"Interdimensional Summit"	Eonian
2018	"Council of Wolves and Snakes"	Eonian
2023	"Perfect Strangers"	Inspiratio Profanus

== Videos ==
=== Video releases ===
Title	Album details	Peak chart positions					
Title	Album details	NOR DVD	AUT DVD	SWI DVD	FIN	GER	SWE DVD
World Misanthropy	Released: 28 May 2002; Label: Nuclear Blast; Formats: VHS, DVD, DVD+CD	—	—	—	—	—	2
The Invaluable Darkness	Released: 6 October 2008; Label: Nuclear Blast; Formats: DVD, DVD+CD, LP	2	3	8	28	69	7
Forces of the Northern Night	Released: 28 April 2017; Label: Nuclear Blast; Formats: CD, CD+DVD, CD+BD, Double LP	—	—	—	—	17	—
Northern Forces Over Wacken	Released: 29 July 2022; Label: Nuclear Blast; Formats: CD, CD+DVD, CD+BD, Double LP	—	—	—	—	—	—

=== Music videos ===
Year	Title	Director	Album
1995	"Alt Lys er Svunnet Hen"	Dimmu Borgir	Stormblast
1997	"The Mourning Palace"	Dimmu Borgir	Enthrone Darkness Triumphant
1997	"Spellbound (By the Devil)"	Dimmu Borgir	Enthrone Darkness Triumphant
1999	"Arcane Lifeforce Mysteria"	Dimmu Borgir	Spiritual Black Dimensions
2001	"Puritania"	Dimmu Borgir	Puritanical Euphoric MIsanthropia
2003	"Progenies of the Great Apocalypse"	Patric Ullaeus	Death Cult Armageddon
2003	"Vredesbyrd"	Patric Ullaeus	Death Cult Armageddon
2005	"Sorgens Kammer – Del II"	Patric Ullaeus	Stormblåst MMV
2007	"The Serpentine Offering"	Patric Ullaeus	In Sorte Diaboli
2007	"The Sacrilegious Scorn"	Joachim Luetke	In Sorte Diaboli
2008	"The Chosen Legacy"	Tod Junker	In Sorte Diaboli
2010	"Gateways"	Sandra Marschner	Abrahadabra
2010	"Dimmu Borgir"	Sandra Marschner	Abrahadabra
2018	"Interdimensional Summit"	—N/a	Eonian
2018	"Council of Wolves and Snakes"	Patric Ullaeus	Eonian
2026	"Ascent"	Patric Ullaeus	Grand Serpent Rising
2026	"Ulvgjeld & Blodsodel"	—N/a	Grand Serpent Rising
2026	"As Seen in the Unseen"	Dariusz Szermanowicz	Grand Serpent Rising
