= Inn i evighetens mørke =

Norwegian black metal EP

EP by Dimmu Borgir
- Released: 17 December 1994
- Recorded: August 1994
- Studio: Stovner Rockefabrikk, Oslo, Norway
- Genre: Melodic black metal
- Length: 12:29
- Language: Norwegian
- Label: Necromantic Gallery Productions
- Producer: Dimmu Borgir

Dimmu Borgir chronology
Inn i evighetens mørke (1994)	For all tid (1995)

Inn i evighetens mørke (English: Into Eternal Darkness) is the first EP by Norwegian symphonic black metal band Dimmu Borgir. It was first released as a demo in August 1994, and later as an EP on 17 December. The EP was released by Necromantic Gallery Productions on 7-inch vinyl limited to 1000 copies.

The EP is included in the True Kings of Norway split-CD by Spinefarm Records, released in 2000; this version removes all vocals from Part I. In 2003, a bootleg version on Hat Records was released, that only contained the two-part track "Inn i evighetens mørke" and "Raabjørn speiler draugheimens skodde" was not included on this release.

The track "Raabjørn speiler draugheimens skodde" would later be included on the band's debut album For all tid, and would also be re-recorded for Enthrone Darkness Triumphant and the Godless Savage Garden EP as well. Both parts of "Inn i evighetens mørke" were remastered for the re-release of For all tid in 1997, again using the instrumental version of Part I.

== Track listing ==
All tracks are written by Silenoz and Shagrath.

Side A
No.	Title	Length
1.	"Inn i evighetens mørke (part I&II)": "Inn i evighetens mørke part I"; "Inn i evighetens mørke part II"	7:31 5:25; 2:06

Side B
No.	Title	Length
1.	"Raabjørn speiler draugheimens skodde" ("Raabjorn Reflects the Mist of Draugheimen")	4:58

== Personnel ==
=== Dimmu Borgir ===
- Erkekjetter Silenoz – lead vocals, rhythm guitar
- Tjodalv – lead guitar
- Brynjard Tristan – bass
- Stian Aarstad - synthesizers, keyboards, effects
- Shagrath – drums

=== Additional personnel ===
- Christophe Szpajdel – logo
