= Nocturnal Breed =

Norwegian thrash metal band

- Origin: Oslo, Norway
- Genres: Thrash metal, black metal
- Years active: 1996−present
- Labels: Agonia, Hammerheart
- Members: S.A Destroyer; I. Maztor; Tex Terror
- Past members: Ed Damnator; V. Fineideath; Jamie Stinson; Rick Hellraiser; Tom Thrawn

Nocturnal Breed is a Norwegian blackened thrash metal band, formed in Oslo in 1996 by singer/bassist Kenneth Svartalv (S.A. Destroyer) and guitarist Sven Atle Kopperud (Ed Damnator).

== Musical style ==
The band plays thrash and black metal with traces of rock 'n' roll. The thrash is based on 1980s bands such as Sodom, Destruction, Vulcano, and Sarcófago. Eduardo Rivadavia of AllMusic described Nocturnal Breed as "what comes about when a bunch of (supposedly) humorless black metal musicians get tired of acting so grim and nihilistic all the time, and decide to have some fun for a change".

== Members ==
- S.A. Destroyer (Kenneth Svartalv): lead vocals, bass (1996–present), guitars (1996–1998)
- I. Maztor (Eivind Berre): guitars (1997–2001, 2011–2019, 2022–present)
- Tex Terror (Thomas Ødegaard): drums, backing vocals (1998–present)

=== Former members ===
- C. Demon (Rune Kristiansen): guitars (1996)
- Andy Michaels (Kenneth Hjorth): drums (1997)
- Bitch Molester (Stian Tomt Thoresen): keyboards (1996)
- Ed Damnator (Sven Atle Kopperud): guitars, bass (1996–1998)
- Tom Thrawn (Tom Kvålsvoll): guitars (2002–2005)
- Ben Hellion (Stian Andreassen): guitars (1998–2011) (died 2022)
- A.E. Rattlehead (Atle Egil Knoff Glomstad): guitars (2006–2011)
- V. Fineideath (Vidar Fineidet): guitars (2011–2022)
- Tommy Jacobsen: guitars (2019–2022)

Session members

- Astennu (Jamie Stinson): session guitars (1997)
- Tjodalv (Ian Kenneth Akesson): session drums (1997)
- Rick Hellraiser (Stian Andre Hinderson): session/live drums (1997)

== Discography ==
- Aggressor (1997)
- Triumph of the Blasphemer EP (1998)
- No Retreat...No Surrender (1999)
- Tools of the Trade (2000)
- Warthog – 7-inch EP, Prostata Records (Ltd. 500) (2004)
- Motörmouth – 7-inch EP, Neseblod Records (Ltd. 100 Yellow vinyl / Ltd. 400 black vinyl) (2004)
- Überthrash – 7-inch Split, Duplicate Records (Split w. Audiopain / Aura Noir / Infernö, Ltd. 500) (2004)
- Überthrash II – 7-inch Split, Duplicate Records (Split w. Audiopain / Aura Noir / Infernö) (2005)
- Remasters – 5-piece Boxset, Painkiller Records (Ltd. 1000) (2005)
- Fields of Rot – LP, Agonia Records (2007)
- Napalm Nights – LP, Agonia Records (2014)
- We Only Came for the Violence – LP, Folter Records (2019)
- Carry the Beast – LP, Dark Essence Records (2023)
