= Enthrone Darkness Triumphant =

Studio album by Dimmu Borgir
- Released: 30 May 1997
- Recorded: January 1997
- Studios: The Abyss, Pärlby, Sweden
- Genres: Symphonic black metal, melodic black metal
- Length: 56:38
- Label: Nuclear Blast
- Producer: Dimmu Borgir

Dimmu Borgir chronology
Devil's Path (1996)	Enthrone Darkness Triumphant (1997)	Godless Savage Garden (1998)

Enthrone Darkness Triumphant is the third studio album by Norwegian symphonic black metal band Dimmu Borgir, released on 30 May 1997 through Nuclear Blast. It was the band's first release through Nuclear Blast and also first recorded and produced in Abyss Studio, Sweden by Peter Tägtgren. It is also the last Dimmu Borgir full-length album to feature keyboardist Stian Aarstad and the first with bassist Nagash. Even though the album is not that different to its predecessor, Stormblåst (1996), in terms of composition and songwriting, it marks major upgrade in quality and aggressiveness of their overall sound. Together with the marketing effort of their new recording label it is one of the key factors that contributed to the major success of this record and breakthrough of the band in general. It is the first full-length album with lyrics in English language. It is also the first full-length album with Shagrath as lead vocalist and the last one until Stormblast MMV where he is the lead guitarist.

== Release ==
The album has been released on many formats, including a limited edition vinyl (300 white and 1000 black). In 2002, a deluxe CD version was released with bonus material. Enthrone Darkness Triumphant was also the band's first album to display their second logo, though the old "black metal" logo is seen in the back cover artwork on the original printing. Due to concerns from Nuclear Blast, the lyrics of "Tormentor of Christian Souls" were omitted from the disc's liner notes. "Master of Disharmony" and "Raabjorn speiler Draugheimens skodde" are re-recorded versions of older, already released tracks (from Devil's Path and For all tid respectively).

== Critical reception ==
Professional ratings
Review scores
Source	Rating
AllMusic	4.5/5 stars
Chronicles of Chaos	9/10
Collector's Guide to Heavy Metal	8/10
Metal Hammer (GER)	7/7
Metal Review	10/10
Rock Hard	9.0/10

Enthrone Darkness Triumphant received generally positive reviews. AllMusic praised the album, writing, "One of the most important Scandinavian metal discs ever, Dimmu Borgir's Enthrone Darkness Triumphant is the group's unquestioned masterpiece." Robert Müller of the German magazine Metal Hammer wrote that Dimmu Borgir, by orienting themselves not "towards the extremes of the scene, but rather towards universally valid virtues for musicians", created a "majestically bombastic black metal masterpiece." Rock Hard remarked how "traditional Nordic black metal can hardly be played in a more brutal, monumental, melodic, dynamic, and captivating way. The songs get under your skin and cover the entire spectrum of the genre. From gothic to fast-paced thrash to heavy metal." Chronicles of Chaos reviewer noticed that "the band's sound resembles Stormblåst in a way, but it's faster now, and much more powerful", creating "a very dark and doomy piece of symphonic melodic black metal" in "one hell of an album". Erik Thomas of Metal review remembered how the release of this album "reminded everyone how the genre should be done" and put Dimmu Borgir on a par with other symphonic black metal bands such as Cradle of Filth, Arcturus, Emperor and Borknagar. He considered that "musically, the lineup on this album simply reached their peak of sweeping, orchestral and truly memorable black metal." The album has occasionally faced some criticism. Death Metal Underground labels it "a ripoff of bands that were new when these musicians were born," noting that it lacks a sense of theme and that it is essentially "a pop album with heavy metal riffs," which lacks the "neoclassical orchestration that made [the previous album] Stormblåst brilliant."

In 2005, Enthrone Darkness Triumphant was ranked number 298 in Rock Hard magazine's book of The 500 Greatest Rock & Metal Albums of All Time. In 2013, Decibel ranked it at number 59 on its list of the Top 100 Black Metal Albums of All Time. In 2020, it was named one of the 20 best metal albums of 1997 by Metal Hammer magazine. In 2021, the magazine ranked it as the 7th best symphonic metal album of all time.

== Track listing ==
All tracks are written by Dimmu Borgir.

No.	Title	Length
1.	"Mourning Palace"	5:13
2.	"Spellbound (By the Devil)"	4:08
3.	"In Death's Embrace"	5:42
4.	"Relinquishment of Spirit and Flesh"	5:32
5.	"The Night Masquerade"	4:25
6.	"Tormentor of Christian Souls"	5:39
7.	"Entrance"	4:47
8.	"Master of Disharmony"	4:15
9.	"Prudence's Fall"	5:56
10.	"A Succubus in Rapture"	5:59
11.	"Raabjørn speiler Draugheimens skodde" ("Raabjørn Reflects the Mist of Draugheimen")	5:02
Total length:		56:38

Bonus tracks on Russian 2001 Irond Records reissue IROND CD 01-46 (taken from Godless Savage Garden)
No.	Title	Length
12.	"Moonchild Domain"	5:24
13.	"Hunnerkongens sorgsvarte ferd over steppene" ("The King of the Huns' Sorrowful Black Journey over the Plains")	3:05
14.	"Chaos Without Prophecy"	7:09

== Charts ==
Chart	Peak position
German Album Charts	75
The Official Finnish Charts	26

== Personnel ==
Dimmu Borgir

- Shagrath – lead vocals (tracks 1–10), lead guitar
- Silenoz – rhythm guitar, lead vocals (track 11)
- Nagash – bass, background vocals, lead guitar (uncredited)
- Stian Aarstad – synthesizer, piano
- Tjodalv – drums

Additional personnel

- Bente Engen – female vocals (track 5)
- Peter Tägtgren – engineering, mixing
