= Devil's Path (EP) =

EP by Dimmu Borgir
- Released: 19 June 1996
- Recorded: 1996
- Studio: Stovner Rockefabrikk, Oslo, Norway
- Genre: Melodic black metal; symphonic black metal
- Length: 18:30
- Label: Hot Records
- Producer: Dimmu Borgir

Dimmu Borgir chronology
Stormblåst (1996)	Devil's Path (1996)	Enthrone Darkness Triumphant (1997)

Devil's Path is the second EP by Norwegian symphonic black metal band Dimmu Borgir. It was originally released in 1996 by Hot Records. This album was reissued in 1999 along with the Old Man's Child Split EP In the Shades of Life, eventually becoming known as Sons of Satan Gather for Attack. The title track would be re-recorded in 2000 and released as part of the special edition of their album Puritanical Euphoric Misanthropia and the opening track would be re-recorded in 1997 and included on Enthrone Darkness Triumphant. It is the first release without keyboardist Stian Aarstad, who would come back for the next full-length album Enthrone Darkness Triumphant. It is also the first release with lyrics in English language. It is also the first release with bassist Nagash, and the first one with Shagrath as lead vocalist.

== Track listing ==
All lyrics are written by Shagrath; all music is composed by Silenoz & Shagrath. "Nocturnal Fear" was originally written and performed by Celtic Frost.

No.	Title	Length
1.	"Master of Disharmony"	6:06
2.	"Devil's Path"	5:32
3.	"Nocturnal Fear"	3:22
4.	"Nocturnal Fear (Celtically Processed)"	3:30

== Personnel ==
Dimmu Borgir

- Shagrath – lead vocals and lead guitar; keyboards, lyrics, music (1 & 2), cover art
- Erkekjetter Silenoz – rhythm guitar; music (1 & 2)
- Nagash – bass guitar and backing vocals
- Tjodalv – drums

Production

- Christophe "Volvox" Szpajdel – logo
- Marius Ryen – producer and engineering
- Vargnatt – mastering
