= Eonian =

Studio album by Dimmu Borgir
- Released: 4 May 2018
- Recorded: 2012
- Genre: Symphonic black metal
- Length: 54:19
- Label: Nuclear Blast
- Producer: Dimmu Borgir; co-produced by Jens Bogren

Dimmu Borgir chronology
Abrahadabra (2010)	Eonian (2018)	Grand Serpent Rising (2026)

Singles from Eonian
- 1. "Interdimensional Summit" Released: 23 February 2018; 2. "Council of Wolves and Snakes" Released: 30 March 2018

Eonian is the ninth studio album by Norwegian symphonic black metal band Dimmu Borgir, which was released on 4 May 2018. It's the fifth and final album featuring lead guitarist Galder before his departure in August 2024.

== Background ==
Production of Eonian originally started at least in 2012 but faced many delays for years after. However, it was given an eventual official release date of 4 May 2018, which ended up being their first original studio album in nearly 8 years following 2010's Abrahadabra. The band self-produced the album while the engineering was handled by Jens Bogren. Dimmu Borgir had to re-sign to their current label Nuclear Blast and reflect on communication during the eight-year gap. During this gap, three of the band members became fathers and focused on their family life. When describing the album's sound, Silenoz stated that the symphonic metal parts are more symphonic while the black metal sound of Dimmu is more black metal this time around. In April, Dimmu Borgir announced limited tour dates for the month of August 2018 with the band playing shows in Las Vegas, Chicago, Toronto, and New York City.

The first single from the album, "Interdimensional Summit", was released on 23 February 2018 on 7" vinyl with an accompanying promotional video. The song received a mixed reception from fans due to its inclusion of folk metal elements to the music. The second single, "Council of Wolves and Snakes", was released on 30 March 2018 with an accompanying music video.

== Reception ==
Professional ratings
Review scores
Source	Rating
AllMusic	3.5/5 stars
Exclaim!	6/10
Metal Hammer	4/5 stars
Metal Injection	10/10 stars
Metal Storm	6.4/10
MetalSucks	2/5 stars

Eonian received mixed reviews from critics upon release. Jason Deaville of Metal Injection rewarded the album with a perfect 10/10, calling it "a stunning, unparalleled effort that should be heard by any lover of metal, no matter their preferred sub-genre. I'm going to go one further and say that Eonian should be heard by any real lover of music." ScreamingSteelUS of Metal Storm gave the album a 6.4/10 stating that "this is just Nightwish with Emperor Palpatine on vocals" while also finding the choirs to be irritating. Axl Rosenberg of MetalSucks gave the album two out of five stars mentioning that: "Yes, Dimmu are a symphonic band, but while Death Cult Armageddon used the symphony to paint soaring visions of the apocalypse and northern winds ripping your face off, Eonian seems content to use it as a go-to gimmick that does nothing for the atmosphere of the album other than corrode it". He then cited the album as "too happy" and said that if he wanted happy, he would go watch The Wiggles. Max Morin of Exclaim! gave the album a 6/10 citing that "although frontman Shagrath has one of the most recognizable voices in metal, Dimmu haven't replaced the vocals of ICS Vortex, which were the highlight of their best releases". Morin believes that only on the first single, "Interdimensional Summit", is where the symphonic parts of the album hit as they should.

A more positive review came from Dom Lawson of Metal Hammer who gave Eonian four out of five stars noting that the songs on the album are complex and memorable. He commented that "where Abrahadabra occasionally felt over-egged, Eonian is a masterclass in fine details and finesse".

== Track listing ==
All music and arrangements by Shagrath, Galder and Silenoz. All lyrics by Silenoz.

No.	Title	Length
1.	"The Unveiling"	5:47
2.	"Interdimensional Summit"	4:39
3.	"Ætheric"	5:28
4.	"Council of Wolves and Snakes"	5:20
5.	"The Empyrean Phoenix"	4:44
6.	"Lightbringer"	6:06
7.	"I Am Sovereign"	6:48
8.	"Archaic Correspondence"	4:55
9.	"Alpha Aeon Omega"	5:18
10.	"Rite of Passage"	5:16

== Personnel ==
=== Dimmu Borgir ===
- Shagrath – lead vocals, bass, keyboards, orchestration, effects
- Galder – lead guitar, bass
- Silenoz – rhythm guitar, bass

=== Session musicians ===
- Gerlioz – keyboards, additional orchestration
- Daray – drums

=== "Council of Wolves and Snakes" ===
- Mikkel Gaup – shaman vocals
- Martin Lopez – voodoo percussion

==== Schola Cantorum ====
- Choirmaster – Gunvald Ottesen
- Choir singers – Agnes Winsents, Agnieszka Pikuta, Annika Belisle, Carl-Christian Kure, Christian Fjellstad, Erik Hedmo, Geirmund Simonsen, Gunhild Marina Tjernstad, Guro Schjelderup, Hauk J. Røsten, Hilde Stenseng, Hugo Herrman, Inger Helseth, Karen Austad Christensen, Lars Christen Hausken, Martin Røsok, Ragnhild E. Bye Lütken, Ragnhild Kleppe, Svein Oskar Smogeli, Synnøve Sætre, Tekla Lou Fure Brandsæter, Thomas Ringen, Vilde Bolstad Bakken, Vilde Groth Pettersen, Øyvind Sætre and Åste Jensen Sjøvaag

=== Crew ===
- Jens Bogren – engineering, mixing, and co-production
- Tony Lindgren – mastering (at Fascination Street Studios)
- Linus Corneliusson – editing
- Gaute Storaas and Shagrath – choir arrangements, recorded with the Schola Cantorum choir at Urban Sound Studio, Norway
- Ludwig Näsvall – drum technician
- Guitar Labs Scandinavia – guitar and bass maintenance
- Zbigniew M. Bielak – cover art

== Charts ==
Chart (2018)	Peak position
Austrian Albums (Ö3 Austria)	10
Belgian Albums (Ultratop Flanders)	21
Belgian Albums (Ultratop Wallonia)	52
Canadian Albums (Billboard)	70
Dutch Albums (Album Top 100)	64
Finnish Albums (Suomen virallinen lista)	4
German Albums (Offizielle Top 100)	4
Hungarian Albums (MAHASZ)	24
Italian Albums (FIMI)	87
Norwegian Albums (VG-lista)	2
Polish Albums (ZPAV)	29
Scottish Albums (OCC)	29
Spanish Albums (PROMUSICAE)	91
Swedish Albums (Sverigetopplistan)	32
Swiss Albums (Schweizer Hitparade)	5
Swiss Albums (Romandie)	1
UK Albums (OCC)	73
US Billboard 200	142
