= Godless Savage Garden =

Compilation album by Dimmu Borgir
- Released: 4 August 1998
- Recorded: January and July 1997
- Studio: The Abyss, Pärlby, Sweden
- Genre: Symphonic black metal; melodic black metal
- Length: 41:12
- Label: Nuclear Blast
- Producer: Dimmu Borgir

Dimmu Borgir chronology
Enthrone Darkness Triumphant (1997)	Godless Savage Garden (1998)	Spiritual Black Dimensions (1999)

Professional ratings
Review scores
Source	Rating
AllMusic	2.5/5 stars
Chronicles of Chaos	5/10
Collector's Guide to Heavy Metal	8/10

Godless Savage Garden is the first compilation album by Norwegian symphonic black metal band Dimmu Borgir. It was released in 1998 by Nuclear Blast and re-released on 3 October 2006 with two bonus tracks. Two of the five studio tracks on this release were recorded during the Enthrone Darkness Triumphant sessions and the other three were recorded in the same studio later that year. This is the first release to include guitarist Astennu and the last to feature former keyboardist Stian Aarstad, who is uncredited in the liner notes.

== Track listing ==
No.	Title	Length
1.	"Moonchild Domain"	5:24
2.	"Hunnerkongens Sorgsvarte Ferd Over Steppene" (The King of the Huns' Sorrowful Black Journey over the Plains - re-recording)	3:05
3.	"Chaos Without Prophecy"	7:09
4.	"Raabjørn Speiler Draugheimens Skodde" (Raabjørn Reflects the Mist of Draugheimen - re-recording)	5:03
5.	"Metal Heart" (Accept cover)	4:40
6.	"Stormblåst" (Stormblown - live in Krakow, Poland on 31/07/1998)	5:09
7.	"Master of Disharmony" (live in Krakow, Poland on 31/07/1998)	4:27
8.	"In Death's Embrace" (live in Krakow, Poland on 31/07/1998)	6:15

2006 Deluxe Edition bonus tracks
No.	Title	Length
9.	"Spellbound (By the Devil)" (live at Credicard Hall, Sao Paulo, Brazil on 24/04/2004)	4:45
10.	"Mourning Palace" (live at Credicard Hall, Sao Paulo, Brazil on 24/04/2004)	5:57

== Personnel ==
Dimmu Borgir

- Shagrath – lead vocals (tracks 1, 3, 5–8), lead guitar (tracks 2, 4)
- Silenoz – rhythm guitar, bass guitar, backing vocals, lead vocals (tracks 2, 4)
- Tjodalv – drums

Other musicians

- Astennu – lead guitar (tracks 1, 3, 5–8)
- Stian Aarstad – keyboards (tracks 2, 4) (uncredited)
- Mustis – keyboards (tracks 6–8)
- Nagash - Bass and Backing Vocals

Technical

- Peter Tägtgren – engineering, mixing (tracks 1-5)

but who was on keyboard in moonchild domain?

== Charts ==
Chart (1998)	Peak position
Austrian Albums (Ö3 Austria)	47
Finnish Albums (Suomen virallinen lista)	25
German Albums (Offizielle Top 100)	56
Dutch Albums (Album Top 100)	98
