= Agony (1992 video game) =

- Cover art by Tony Roberts
- Developers: Art & Magic
- Publisher: Psygnosis
- Designer: Yves Grolet
- Platform: Amiga
- Release: EU/NA: 1992
- Genre: Scrolling shooter
- Mode: Single-player

Agony is a horizontally scrolling shooter with a surreal fantasy background. It was released by Psygnosis in 1992 for the Amiga. Agony features a barn owl flying its way through six worlds filled with monsters. The owl uses various waves of echolocation which the player fires at the enemies.

== Plot ==
According to the manual backstory, the sun-wizard master Acanthopsis discovers the "Cosmic Power" with a toll on his life. Before dying he teaches it to his disciples, Alestes and Mentor. Alestes has been transformed into a barn owl, and has to pass through Mentor's traps and monsters in order to reach the Cosmic Power.

== Gameplay ==
Agony is a classic horizontal scrolling shoot'em up. Controlling the owl, the player has to navigate through six levels shooting at enemies, avoiding hazards and defeating mid-level and end-level bosses. The player is able to power-up the owl's basic shot up to three times by collecting magic potions. In addition, two flying swords can be picked up and act as defense systems, that damage enemies and destroy enemies' projectiles. Also, a magic scroll provides temporary invincibility. A single contact with an enemy or a projectile costs the player one of its three lives and part of its power-ups. Upon getting the related scrolls, the player is also able to open a spell menu and choose between eight different temporary spells that provide various advantages, from extra firepower to defensive effects.

== Music ==
The theme song is by Tim Wright, a classically themed, piano-led instrumental. The title song is slightly different from the version that Wright originally submitted. Franck Sauer advised Wright that he could source improved piano sounds for the piece, and requested permission to change them. Wright agreed, but did not hear the result before the game went to the final master, and consequently some notes within the piece were transposed.

The track was later adapted without credit by the band Dimmu Borgir for the instrumental "Sorgens Kammer" on the album Stormblåst. It was omitted from a later re-recording of the album due to copyright issues.

== Legacy ==
Around 2010, graphic artist Franck Sauer started to offer the game's binary files (ADF format) for free download on his personal webpage, making the game freeware. On July 4, 2020, the programmer of the game, Yves Grolet, uploaded all his Amiga development files (which included full source code for Agony) to WeTransfer.
