= Brynjard Tristan =

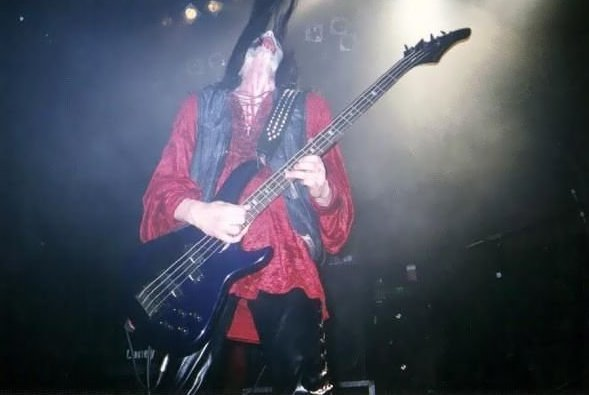
- Tristan in 2009

Background information
- Born: Ivar Tristan Lundsten; 14 June 1976 (age 50); Jessheim, Norway
- Genres: Melodic black metal, thrash metal, blackened death metal
- Occupations: Musician, songwriter
- Instruments: Vocals, bass
- Years active: 1992–present

Ivar Tristan Lundsten (professional name: Brynjard Tristan; born 14 June 1976) is a Norwegian bassist and songwriter, presently living in Oslo, but originally hails from the nearby municipalities of Nesodden and Jessheim.

He is mostly known for his time as bassist for the symphonic black metal band Dimmu Borgir, from 1993 to 1996, which he left after the album Stormblåst. In 1994-1995 Brynjard was also a member of Old Man's Child, where he was a songwriter and played bass on the band's demo In The Shades Of Life. However, he left the band just before the release of their first album.

He also used to be a writer for the Norwegian music magazine Mute.

Presently Brynjard is working on his new band, Angstkrieg, where he is the vocalist.

== Discography ==
=== With Dimmu Borgir ===
- Inn I Evighetens Mørke, EP, Necromantic Gallery Productions, 1993
- For All Tid, album, No Colours Records, 1994
- Stormblåst, album, Cacophonous Records, 1996

=== With Old Man’s Child ===
- In the Shades of Life, demo, 1994, reissued as split EP with Dimmu Borgir named Sons of Satan Gather for Attack, Hammerheart Records, 1999

=== With Angstkrieg ===
- Angstkrieg, EP, self-released, 2010
