= Grand Serpent Rising =

Studio album by Dimmu Borgir
- Released: 22 May 2026
- Studio: Studio Fredman
- Genre: Symphonic black metal
- Length: 69:18
- Language: English; Norwegian
- Label: Nuclear Blast
- Producer: Dimmu Borgir

Dimmu Borgir chronology
Eonian (2018)	Grand Serpent Rising (2026)

Singles from Grand Serpent Rising
- 1. "Ulvgjeld & Blodsodel" Released: 26 March 2026; 2. "Ascent" Released: 23 April 2026

Grand Serpent Rising is the tenth studio album by Norwegian symphonic black metal band Dimmu Borgir. The album was released on 22 May 2026, by Nuclear Blast. Grand Serpent Rising is the band's first album to have a few songs in its native Norwegian since Stormblåst MMV (2005), while the majority of the album is predominantly in English.

== Background ==
According to updates on the band members' Instagram accounts in September 2020, Dimmu Borgir was in the process of writing and pre-production for their tenth studio album. Silenoz originally claimed the new album wouldn't take as long to release. However, he later took back this statement in December 2023, where he said the band was not prepared to rush the album, and said it will be finished when it is finished, and referred to the 8 years it took Eonian to be released as the longest time it could take for the next album. This marks the second release by the band that has a large time gap of around 8 years, since their previous album.

On 18 August 2024, Galder announced via his Instagram account that he had left Dimmu Borgir, playing his last show the day before at Dynamo Metal Fest. In December 2024, it was revealed on the band's official Instagram that they had entered the studio to record their tenth studio album. In September 2025, the band revealed that the new album had been recorded, mastered and completed.

== Release and promotion ==
On 23 March 2026, Dimmu Borgir released a video teaser for what would be Grand Serpent Rising. They announced this album three days later alongside its lead single "Ulvgjeld & Blodsodel". On 23 April 2026, they released the second single "Ascent".

== Track listing ==
All tracks are written by Sven Atle Kopperud and Stian Thoresen.

Grand Serpent Rising track listing
No.	Title	Length
1.	"Tridentium"	3:55
2.	"Ascent"	5:21
3.	"As Seen in the Unseen"	6:59
4.	"The Qryptfarer"	4:30
5.	"Ulvgjeld & Blodsodel"	5:42
6.	"Repository of Divine Transmutation"	6:33
7.	"Slik Minnes en Alkymist"	5:38
8.	"Phantom of the Nemesis"	5:07
9.	"The Exonerated"	5:57
10.	"Recognizant"	5:51
11.	"At the Precipice of Convergence"	4:16
12.	"Shadows of a Thousand Perceptions"	5:29
13.	"Gjǫll" (Instrumental)	4:00
Total length:		69:18

== Personnel ==
Credits are adapted from Tidal, except where noted.

=== Dimmu Borgir ===
- Stian Thoresen – vocals, keyboards, effects, orchestrations, production
- Sven Atle Kopperud – guitar, effects, production
- Daray – drums, production
- Geir Bratland – keyboards, production
- Kjell Åge Karlsen – lead guitar, production
- Victor Brandt – bass guitar, production
- Enya Thoresen – main clean vocals on track 5
- Tom Rune Andersen – additional musical contribution

=== Additional contributor ===
- Fredrik Nordström – recording, mixing, mastering

== Charts ==
Chart performance for Grand Serpent Rising
Chart (2026)	Peak position
Australian Albums (ARIA)	76
Austrian Albums (Ö3 Austria)	5
Belgian Albums (Ultratop Flanders)	41
Belgian Albums (Ultratop Wallonia)	20
Dutch Albums (Album Top 100)	41
Finnish Albums (Suomen virallinen lista)	5
French Albums (SNEP)	104
French Rock & Metal Albums (SNEP)	3
German Albums (Offizielle Top 100)	6
German Rock & Metal Albums (Offizielle Top 100)	1
Norwegian Albums (IFPI Norge)	11
Norwegian Rock Albums (IFPI Norge)	1
Polish Albums (ZPAV)	19
Scottish Albums (OCC)	22
Swedish Albums (Sverigetopplistan)	57
Swedish Hard Rock Albums (Sverigetopplistan)	3
Swiss Albums (Schweizer Hitparade)	4
UK Albums Sales (OCC)	24
UK Independent Albums (OCC)	11
UK Rock & Metal Albums (OCC)	4
US Top Album Sales (Billboard)	50
