= Spiritual Black Dimensions =

Studio album by Dimmu Borgir
- Released: 2 March 1999
- Recorded: August–October 1998
- Studio: The Abyss, Pärlby, Sweden
- Genre: Symphonic black metal
- Length: 49:14
- Label: Nuclear Blast
- Producer: Peter Tägtgren, Dimmu Borgir

Dimmu Borgir chronology
Godless Savage Garden (1998)	Spiritual Black Dimensions (1999)	Puritanical Euphoric Misanthropia (2001)

Spiritual Black Dimensions is the fourth studio album by Norwegian symphonic black metal band Dimmu Borgir, released in 1999 through Nuclear Blast Records. The album is the first release featuring keyboardist Mustis and the clean vocals of ICS Vortex, and the last one with long-time drummer Tjodalv, guitarist Astennu, and bassist Nagash. It is also the first one where Shagrath is totally on lead vocals and didn't play any instrument, being the first full-length album where the band features six musicians.

The album marks major compositional and stylistic shift from romantic influences of their previous albums to a more sinister and macabre sound. In terms of production, it is the second consecutive full-length Dimmu Borgir album recorded at Abyss Studio, Sweden by Peter Tägtgren. According to the band, they faced difficulties when mixing the album due too many recorded layers, hence two different versions were mixed in the studio. Eventually the second one was released.

During the actual recording session, Astennu also recorded Mirrored Hate Painting, a second album of his side project Carpe Tenebrum with Nagash on vocals in Abyss Studio B, which was run by Tommy Tägtgren, Peter's brother. A deluxe edition was released in 2004 with bonus material. A digipak edition with reflective/holographic cover art was also published, which contains no bonus tracks.

The album cover was part of the top 10 of Greatest Heavy Metal Album Covers by Blender magazine in 2006. It was inspired by The Wounded Angel, a painting by a Finnish symbolist artist Hugo Simberg.

== Reception ==
Professional ratings
Review scores
Source	Rating
AllMusic	4/5 stars
Chronicles of Chaos	8/10
Collector's Guide to Heavy Metal	8/10
Metal Storm	9.2/10
Rock Hard	9.5/10

Steve Huey of AllMusic stated that "Dimmu Borgir's arrangements continue to increase in complexity and sophistication on Spiritual Black Dimensions, improving on its predecessors and illustrating the band's musical progression". Rock Hard praised the "ingenious thrash riffs, heavy metal power, top-notch solos, first-class melodies, a goosebump-inducing atmosphere, aggression, and melancholy" and scoffed at the " die-hard black metal fans who see only blatant profiteering and a betrayal of the scene's lofty ideals behind such a professionally produced record as Spiritual Black Dimensions." In fact, in Slayer no. 13, Jon 'Metalion' Kristiansen called Spiritual Black Dimensions "a fine case of melodic, over-produced, symphonic metal. If you like this melodic style I can't really think of anyone doing it better […]. No, I wouldn't call this black metal." Chronicles of Chaos reviewer agrees with the aformentioned and stated that "if Dimmu Borgir were hoping to make one of the greatest black metal albums of all time, then I think they have fallen far short of the mark. However, if their aim was to make a complex, mature, but also quite heavy record, then they have succeeded, and in an area where many bands fail miserably." In his review, Canadian journalist Martin Popoff complained about the production which "softened the edge" of the sound and judged the album "highly creative within the band's conservative self-set boundaries, but not as truly arresting as mad scientists Opeth and too creamy smooth."

== Track listing ==
All music is composed by Dimmu Borgir.

No.	Title	Lyrics	Length
1.	"Reptile"	Silenoz	5:17
2.	"Behind the Curtains of Night - Phantasmagoria"	Silenoz	3:21
3.	"Dreamside Dominions"	Silenoz	5:14
4.	"United in Unhallowed Grace"	Nagash	4:22
5.	"The Promised Future Aeons"	Nagash	6:52
6.	"The Blazing Monoliths of Defiance"	Nagash	4:38
7.	"The Insight and the Catharsis"	Silenoz	7:17
8.	"Grotesquery Conceiled (Within Measureless Magic)"	Silenoz	5:10
9.	"Arcane Lifeforce Mysteria"	Silenoz, Nagash, Shagrath	7:03

Japanese Edition bonus track
No.	Title	Length
10.	"Masses for the New Messiah"	5:11

== Personnel ==
Dimmu Borgir

- Shagrath – lead vocals
- Silenoz – rhythm guitar
- Astennu – lead guitar
- Nagash – bass guitar, backing vocals
- Tjodalv – drums
- Mustis – keyboards

Guests

- ICS Vortex – clean vocals on tracks 1, 3, 7 and 9

Technical staff

- Peter Tägtgren – mixing, engineering, producer

== Charts ==
Chart (1998)	Peak position
Austrian Albums (Ö3 Austria)	31
Finnish Albums (Suomen virallinen lista)	14
German Albums (Offizielle Top 100)	25
Dutch Albums (Album Top 100)	98
Norwegian Albums (VG-lista)	18
Swedish Albums (Sverigetopplistan)	44
UK Independent Albums (OCC)	24
