= Death Cult Armageddon =

- Cover art by Joachim Luetke

Studio album by Dimmu Borgir
- Released: 9 September 2003
- Recorded: March–May 2003
- Studio: Fredman Studio, Gothenburg, Sweden
- Genre: Symphonic black metal
- Length: 63:29
- Label: Nuclear Blast (#NB 1047)
- Producer: Dimmu Borgir, Fredrik Nordström

Dimmu Borgir chronology
World Misanthropy (2002)	Death Cult Armageddon (2003)	Stormblåst MMV (2005)

Alternative cover

Singles from Death Cult Armageddon
- 1. "Progenies of the Great Apocalypse" Released: 21 August 2003; 2. "Vredesbyrd" Released: 14 May 2004

Professional ratings
Review scores
Source	Rating
AllMusic	5/5 stars
Chronicles of Chaos	8.5/10
Metal Hammer (GER)	7/7
Metal Review	9.2/10
Rock Hard	9.5/10

Death Cult Armageddon is the sixth studio album by Norwegian symphonic black metal band Dimmu Borgir, released on 9 September 2003. It has since sold over 100,000 copies in the United States; the first album under Nuclear Blast to do so; and debuted on the Billboard 200 chart at number 169. The song "Progenies of the Great Apocalypse" was released as a single with an accompanying music video. This would also be the last album to have Nick Barker on drums and the only one featuring full-scale orchestral ensemble (recorded in Prague).

The artwork within the album, done by Swiss artist Joachim Luetke, displays what appears to be an industrial factory, inside of which the band members are living out their fantasies, some of which are similar to scenes seen in the music video for "Progenies of the Great Apocalypse". Most of the songs have a common apocalyptic theme.

== Release history ==
Death Cult Armageddon saw initial release on CD, vinyl and DVD-Audio on 9 September 2003 under Nuclear Blast, the DVD-Audio edition featuring all three bonus tracks, the "Progenies of the Great Apocalypse" music video and photo galleries, which later featured on the Ozzfest edition bonus disc, and the Digipack editions featured the Bathory cover "Satan My Master". The Chinese edition was later released on 3 November 2003 and the Japanese edition was released on 22 September 2003 with the orchestral bonus tracks.

== Track listing ==
No.	Title	Lyrics	Music	Length
1.	"Allegiance"	Silenoz	Shagrath, Galder, Mustis	5:50
2.	"Progenies of the Great Apocalypse"	Silenoz	Mustis	5:17
3.	"Lepers Among Us"	Silenoz	Galder, Silenoz, Shagrath	4:43
4.	"Vredesbyrd" (Burden of Wrath)	Silenoz	Mustis, Shagrath, Silenoz	4:44
5.	"For the World to Dictate Our Death"	Silenoz	Shagrath	4:46
6.	"Blood Hunger Doctrine"	Silenoz, Shagrath	Shagrath, Mustis	4:39
7.	"Allehelgens død i Helveds rike" (The Death of All Saints in the Kingdom of Hell)	Silenoz	Silenoz, Galder, Mustis, Vortex	5:33
8.	"Cataclysm Children"	Silenoz	Galder, Silenoz	5:13
9.	"Eradication Instincts Defined"	Silenoz	Mustis, Silenoz	7:12
10.	"Unorthodox Manifesto"	Aldrahn, Silenoz	Galder, Mustis, Silenoz, Shagrath	8:50
11.	"Heavenly Perverse"	Silenoz	Vortex, Galder, Shagrath	6:33

Ozzfest edition bonus disc
No.	Title	Writer(s)	Length
1.	"Satan My Master" (Bathory cover)	Quorthon	2:14
2.	"Burn in Hell" (Twisted Sister cover)	Dee Snider	5:05
3.	"Devil's Path" (Re-recorded)	Silenoz, Shagrath	6:06
4.	"Progenies of the Great Apocalypse" (Orchestral version)	Mustis	5:15
5.	"Eradication Instincts Defined" (Orchestral version)	Mustis, Silenoz	7:24
6.	"Progenies of the Great Apocalypse" (Video Clip)	Mustis	3:38

== Personnel ==
Dimmu Borgir

- Shagrath – lead vocals
- Silenoz – rhythm guitar
- Galder – lead guitar
- ICS Vortex – bass, clean vocals on tracks 2 and 7
- Mustis – grand piano, synth
- Nick Barker – drums

Guests

- Abbath Doom Occulta – backing vocals on "Progenies of the Great Apocalypse" and "Heavenly Perverse"
- Orchestration arranged by Gaute Storås
- Recorded with the Prague Philharmonic Orchestra (tracks 1–2, 4–7, 9–11)
- Conducted by Adam Klemens
- Charlie Storm – additional synthetics, sample assistance

Technical staff

- Fredrik Nordström and Shagrath – mixing, engineering, producer
- Patrik Sten – assistant engineering
- Arnold Linberg – assistant engineering
- Peter in de Detou – mastering
- Joachim Luetke – cover concept, artwork
- Alf Børjesson – group shots

== Charts ==
Chart	Peak position
Hungarian Albums (MAHASZ)	39
