= Shagrath =

Norwegian musician (born 1976)

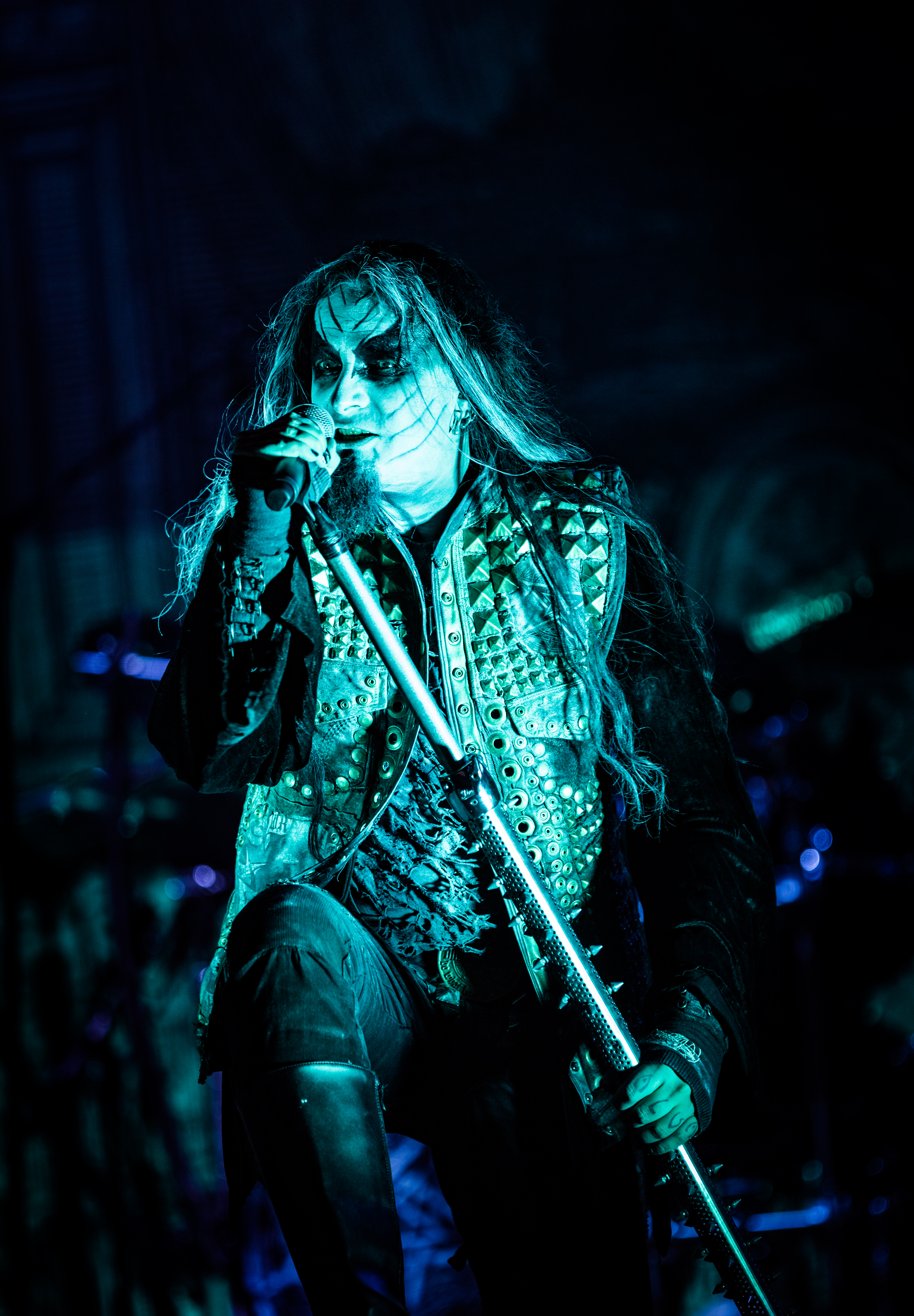
- Shagrath with Dimmu Borgir at Wacken Open Air 2018

Background information
- Born: Stian Tomt Thoresen; 18 November 1976 (age 49); Jessheim, Akershus, Norway
- Genre: Symphonic black metal
- Occupation: Musician
- Instruments: Vocals, guitar, bass, drums, keyboards
- Years active: 1992–present
- Website: dimmu-borgir.com

Stian Tomt Thoresen (born 18 November 1976), known professionally as Shagrath, is a Norwegian musician. He is the vocalist, multi-instrumentalist, and a founding member of the symphonic black metal band Dimmu Borgir and also a founding member, rhythm guitarist and bassist of Chrome Division.

== Biography ==
Stian Thoresen was born on 18 November 1976 in Jessheim. He is a founding member, with Silenoz and Tjodalv, of Dimmu Borgir. When the band formed in 1993, Shagrath played drums, but switched to vocals before the release of the album Stormblåst in 1996. He has also played keyboards, guitar, and bass.

Shagrath played guitar in Fimbulwinter until the band split up in 1992. Fimbulwinter released one album, Servants of Sorcery, through Hot Records (Shagrath's record label) in 1994. Shagrath is also the rhythm guitarist/songwriter and a founding member of the hard rock band Chrome Division, which formed in 2004.

In late 2009, Shagrath and King ov Hell formed the black metal supergroup Ov Hell. In February 2010 the band released an album entitled The Underworld Regime. Shagrath has also played guest keyboards in the black metal band Ragnarok, and had a solo project named Starkness.

== Stage name ==
Shagrath has said this about his stage name: "Shagrath is an orc demon from the book Lord of the Rings. I chose the name thirteen years ago, so it's kinda crappy that Lord of the Rings has become so big now. Fortunately it [the name] didn't get that much attention in the movie, so it turned out all OK." The Tolkien character Shagrat, an orc commander over Cirith Ungol, is however not a demon in Tolkien lore.

== Discography ==
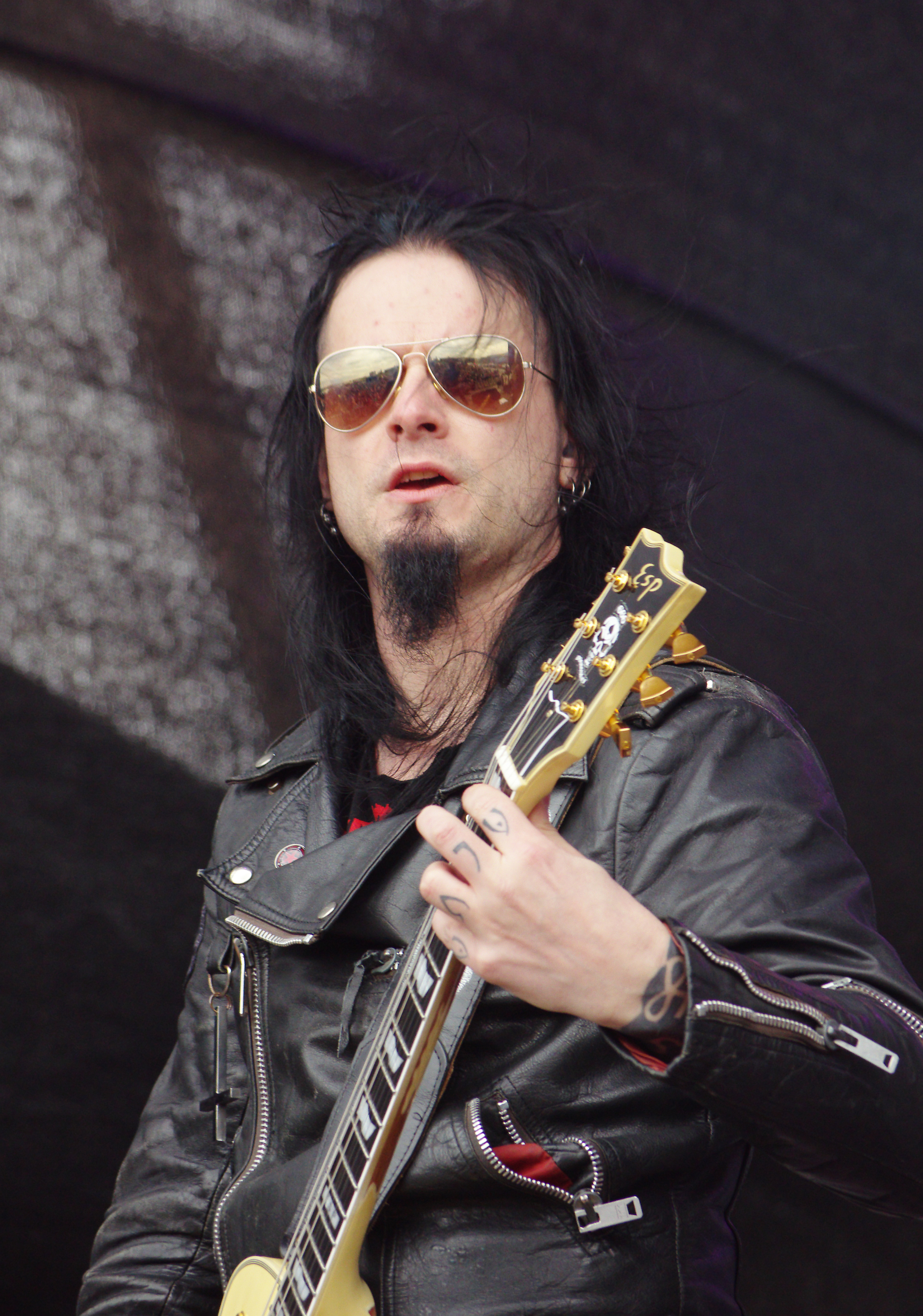
Shagrath with Chrome Division in 2013

=== With Dimmu Borgir ===
- Inn i evighetens mørke (1994)
- For all tid (1995)
- Stormblåst (1996)
- Devil's Path (1996)
- Enthrone Darkness Triumphant (1997)
- Godless Savage Garden (1998)
- Sons of Satan Gather for Attack (split EP with Old Man's Child) (1999)
- Spiritual Black Dimensions (1999)
- True Kings of Norway (2000) (split with Emperor, Immortal, Ancient, and Arcturus) (1998)
- Puritanical Euphoric Misanthropia (2001)
- Alive in Torment (2001)
- World Misanthropy (2002)
- Death Cult Armageddon (2003)
- Stormblåst MMV (2005)
- In Sorte Diaboli (2007)
- The Invaluable Darkness (2008)
- Abrahadabra (2010)
- Eonian (2018)
- Grand Serpent Rising (2026)

=== With Chrome Division ===
- Doomsday Rock 'n Roll (2006)
- Booze, Broads and Beelzebub (2008)
- 3rd Round Knockout (2011)
- Infernal Rock Eternal (2014)
- One Last Ride (2018)

=== With Starkness ===
- Unto The Darkly Shining World (single) (1996) (solo project)

=== With Ragnarok ===
- Arising Realm (1997) (Guest Keyboards )

=== With Ov Hell ===
- The Underworld Regime (2010)

=== With Fimbulwinter ===
- Servants of Sorcery (1994)

=== As a guest vocalist ===
- Astarte – Sirens (2004, song "The Ring of Sorrow")
- Diaz – Velkommen Hjem Andres (2004, song "Mitt Terningkast")
- Destruction – Inventor of Evil (2005, song "The Alliance of Hellhoundz")
- Kamelot – The Black Halo (2005, songs "March of Mephisto" and "Memento Mori")
- Susperia – Attitude (2009, song "Sick Bastard")
- Old Man's Child – Slaves of the World (2009, song "Born of the Flickering" (limited edition bonus track))
- Crossplane – Class of Hellhound high (2013, song "I Will Be King")
- The Carburetors – Laughing in the face of death (2015, song "Lords of Thunder")
- Behemoth – I, Scvlptor (2026, song "In League with Satan")
