= Mustis =

Norwegian musician

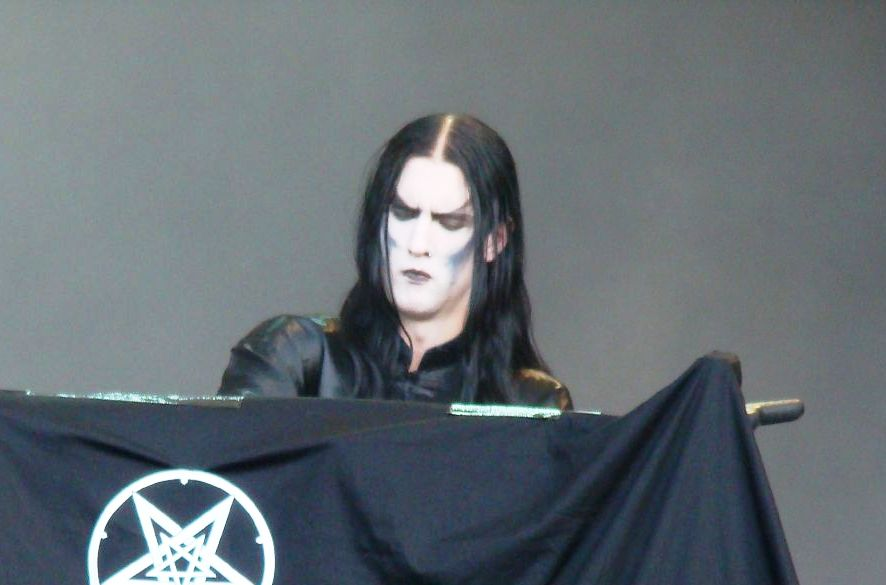
- Mustis in 2007

Background information
- Born: Øyvind Johan Mustaparta; 10 September 1979 (age 46); Bærum, Norway
- Genres: Symphonic black metal
- Occupations: Musician, composer
- Instruments: Keyboards, piano
- Years active: 1998–2011, 2018–present

Mustis is the pseudonym of Øyvind Johan Mustaparta (born 10 September 1979), a Norwegian musician and composer best known for his work as a keyboardist and composer in the symphonic black metal band Dimmu Borgir.

== Biography ==
Mustis made his first recorded appearances with Dimmu Borgir in 1998 and became a full member shortly thereafter. He played a significant role in the development of the band's symphonic and orchestral sound and is credited as a composer on several key works from this period, including "Progenies of the Great Apocalypse" and "Eradication Instincts Defined" from the album Death Cult Armageddon (2003).

His studio work with Dimmu Borgir includes the albums Spiritual Black Dimensions (1999), Puritanical Euphoric Misanthropia (2001), Death Cult Armageddon (2003), the re-recorded version of Stormblåst (2005), and In Sorte Diaboli (2007).

Mustis departed Dimmu Borgir in 2009. Following his departure, he stated that issues relating to authorship registration and contractual matters would be resolved through legal channels.

In 2024, Mustis reunited on stage with Dimmu Borgir to perform "The Insight and the Catharsis" at the Inferno Metal Festival, alongside former members ICS Vortex and Tjodalv.

The surname Mustaparta is of Finnish origin and translates literally as "black beard".

== Selected works ==
The following list highlights selected compositions and does not represent a complete discography.

Spiritual Black Dimensions (1999)

- "Reptile"
- "Grotesquery Concealed"
- "Promised Future Aeons"
- "The Insight and the Catharsis"

Puritanical Euphoric Misanthropia (2001)

- "Fear and Wonder"
- "Kings of the Carnival Creation"
- "Hybrid Stigmata – The Apostasy"
- "Indoctrination"
- "Sympozium"

Death Cult Armageddon (2003)

- "Allegiance"
- "Progenies of the Great Apocalypse"
- "Vredesbyrd"
- "Blood Hunger Doctrine"
- "Allehelgens død i helveds rike"
- "Eradication Instincts Defined"

In Sorte Diaboli (2007)

- "The Serpentine Offering"
- "The Sacrilegious Scorn"
- "The Fallen Arises"
- "The Fundamental Alienation"
