= For all tid =

Studio album by Dimmu Borgir
- Released: 15 March 1995; 12 September 1997 (re-release)
- Recorded: August–December 1994 at
- Studio: Stovner Rockefabrikk, Oslo, Norway
- Genre: Melodic black metal
- Length: 42:38
- Language: Norwegian
- Label: No Colours (1995); Nuclear Blast (1997)
- Producer: Dimmu Borgir

Dimmu Borgir chronology
Inn i evighetens mørke (1994)	For all tid (1995)	Stormblåst (1996)

Alternate cover
- 1997 re-release cover

For all tid (Norwegian: "For All Time") is the debut studio album by Norwegian symphonic black metal band Dimmu Borgir. It was released in 1995 through No Colours. It was remastered and re-released in 1997 through their new label Nuclear Blast with the front cover art in full color and the entire Inn i evighetens mørke EP added. It is the band's only studio album on which Shagrath is on drums, Tjodalv on guitar and Silenoz on vocals.

The artwork displayed on the front cover of the album is inspired by Gustave Doré's illustration of Camelot from Idylls of the King.

== Track listing ==
All tracks are written by Shagrath, Silenoz and Aldrahn.

No.	Title	Length
1.	"Det nye riket" ("The New Kingdom")	5:04
2.	"Under korpens vinger" ("Under the Wings of the Raven")	5:59
3.	"Over bleknede blåner til dommedag" ("Over Pale Horizons unto Judgement Day")	4:05
4.	"Stien" ("The Path")	2:00
5.	"Glittertind" ("Glittertind")	5:15
6.	"For all tid" ("For All Time")	5:51
7.	"Hunnerkongens sorgsvarte ferd over steppene" ("The Hunnic King's Sorrow Black Journey Across the Steppes")	3:04
8.	"Raabjørn speiler draugheimens skodde" ("Raabjørn Reflects the Mist of Draugheimen")	5:01
9.	"Den gjemte sannhets hersker" ("The Ruler of the Hidden Truth")	6:19
Total length:		42:38

Bonus tracks on 1997 remastered edition
No.	Title	Length
10.	"Inn i evighetens mørke, Part 1" ("Into Eternal Darkness, Part 1")	5:25
11.	"Inn i evighetens mørke, Part 2" ("Into Eternal Darkness, Part 2")	2:09
Total length:		50:12

Additional tracks on Japanese edition
No.	Title	Length
12.	"Spellbound (By the Devil)" (live)	4:08
13.	"Tormentor of Christian Souls" (live)	5:39
14.	"Master of Disharmony" (live)	6:05
15.	"Metal Heart" (live) (Accept cover)	4:27
Total length:		70:31

== Critical reception ==
Professional ratings
Review scores
Source	Rating
AllMusic	4/5 stars
Collector's Guide to Heavy Metal	7/10
Rock Hard	8.5/10

In their favourable review of the album, AllMusic wrote, "The production is awful, boasting thin and sharp guitars, muted drumming and echoing vocals that sound like what it might have been like to stand outside of their rehearsal hall. But somehow the songs manage to overcome the production, offering a somewhat beautiful (albeit warped) view of heavy metal that comes off far more ambitious than a band in their position usually does." Canadian jouralist Martin Popoff remarked how in the album "the basics for symphonic, varied, dynamics-charged sound was in evidence, despite a woefully thin production job."

== Personnel ==
Dimmu Borgir

- Silenoz – lead vocals and rhythm guitar
- Tjodalv – lead guitar
- Stian Aarstad – synthesizers, keyboards and effects
- Brynjard Tristan – bass guitar
- Shagrath – drums, backing vocals and third guitar on "Glittertind"

Additional personnel

- Vicotnik (Dødheimsgard, Ved Buens Ende, Code, Naer Mataron) – backing vocals
- Aldrahn (Dødheimsgard, Thorns, Zyklon-B) – backing vocals and lead vocals (on "Over bleknede blåner til dommedag")

Production

- Dimmu Borgir – arrangement and production
- Bård Norheim – recording and engineering
- Christophe Szpajdel – logo
