= Dimmu Borgir =

Norwegian symphonic black metal band

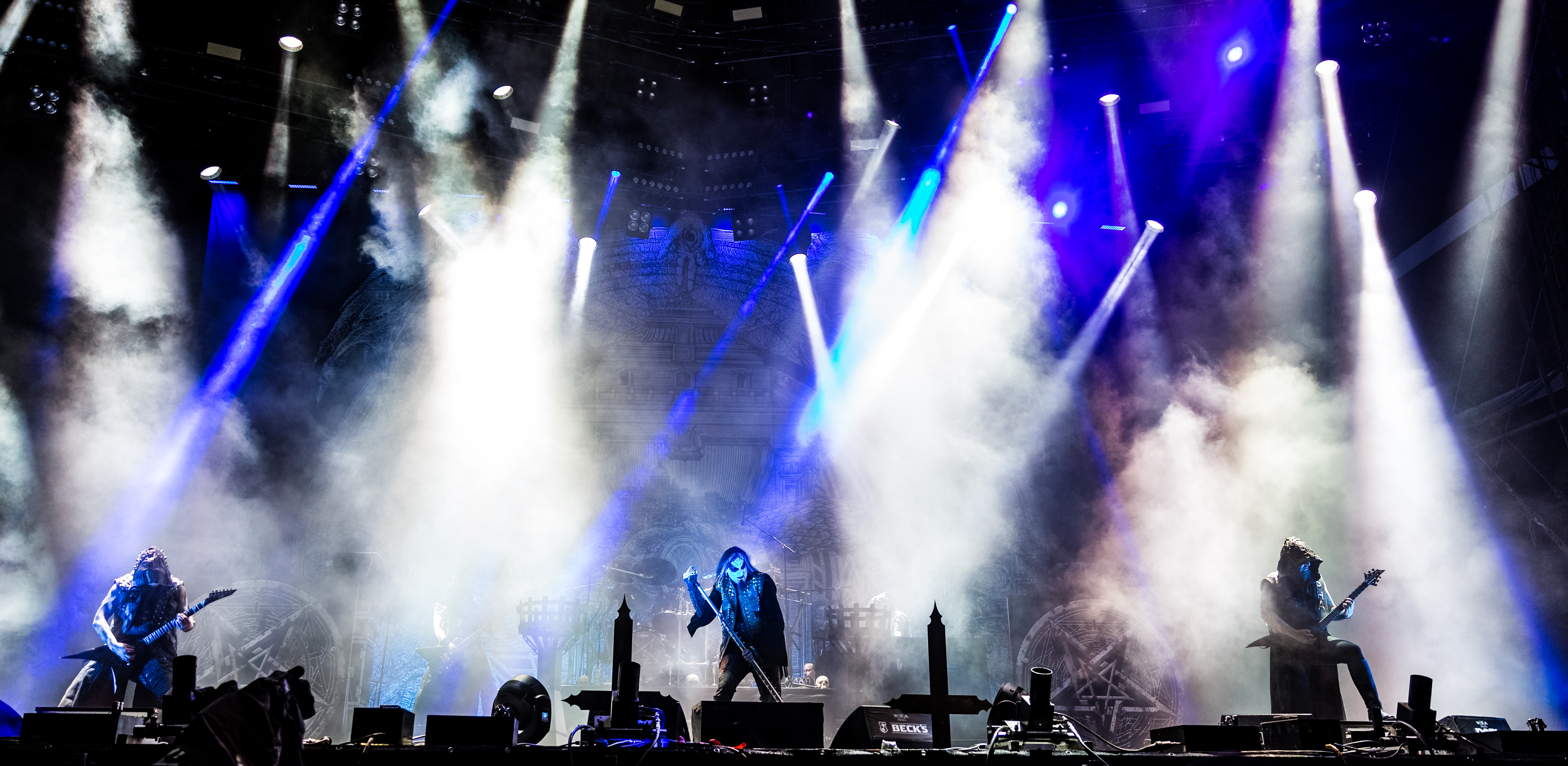
- Dimmu Borgir at Wacken Open Air 2018

Background information
- Origin: Jessheim, Norway
- Genres: Symphonic black metal, melodic black metal
- Years active: 1993–present
- Labels: No Colours, Spikefarm, Cacophonous, Century Media, Nuclear Blast
- Members: Shagrath; Silenoz; Daray; Gerlioz; Victor Brandt; Damage
- Past members: Full list
- Website: dimmu-borgir.com

Dimmu Borgir (/ˈdɪmuː ˈbɔːrɡɪər/) is a Norwegian symphonic black metal band from Jessheim, formed in 1993. The name derives from Dimmuborgir, a volcanic formation in Iceland, the name of which means "dark cities" or "dark castles/fortresses" in Icelandic, Faroese and Old Norse. The band has been through numerous lineup changes over the years. Vocalist Shagrath and guitarist Silenoz are the only remaining original members.

== History ==
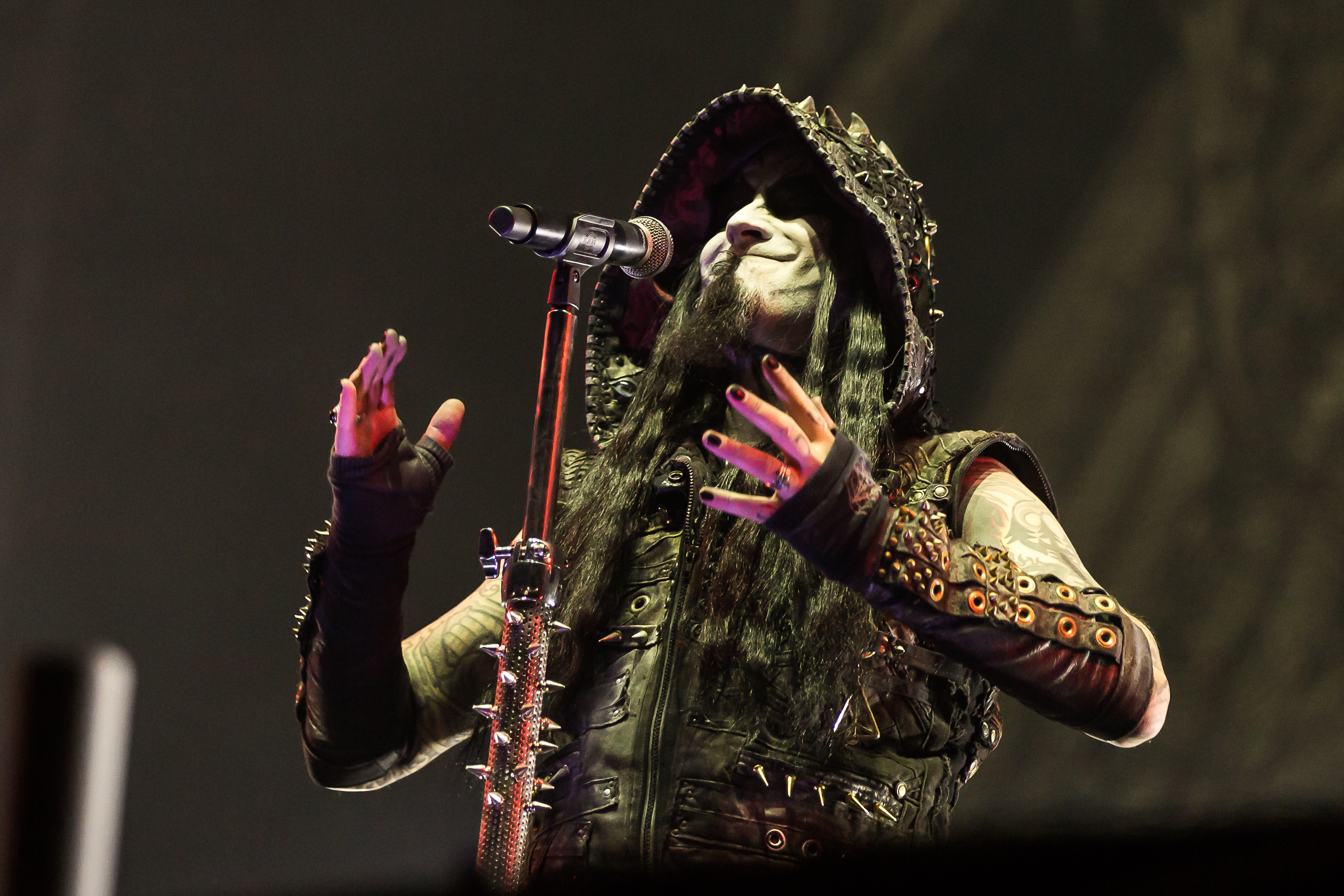
Singer Stian Tomt "Shagrath" Thoresen at Rockharz Open Air 2019

=== For All Tid and Stormblåst period ===
Dimmu Borgir was founded in 1993 by Silenoz and Tjodalv. Shagrath, Brynjard Tristan and Stian Aarstad later joined the band. They released an EP in 1994 titled Inn i evighetens mørke ("Into the Darkness of Eternity"). This EP sold out in weeks, and the band followed up with the 1994 full-length album For All Tid ("For All Time"). This album featured vocals by Vicotnik of Ved Buens Ende and Dødheimsgard and Aldrahn of Dødheimsgard and Zyklon-B. The initial line-up consisted of drummer Shagrath with Tjodalv on guitar and singer Silenoz. This line-up changed before the release of Stormblåst ("Stormblown") on Cacophonous Records in 1996, an album many consider their finest. It was also the last album featuring all lyrics written and sung in Norwegian.

=== Enthrone Darkness Triumphant period ===
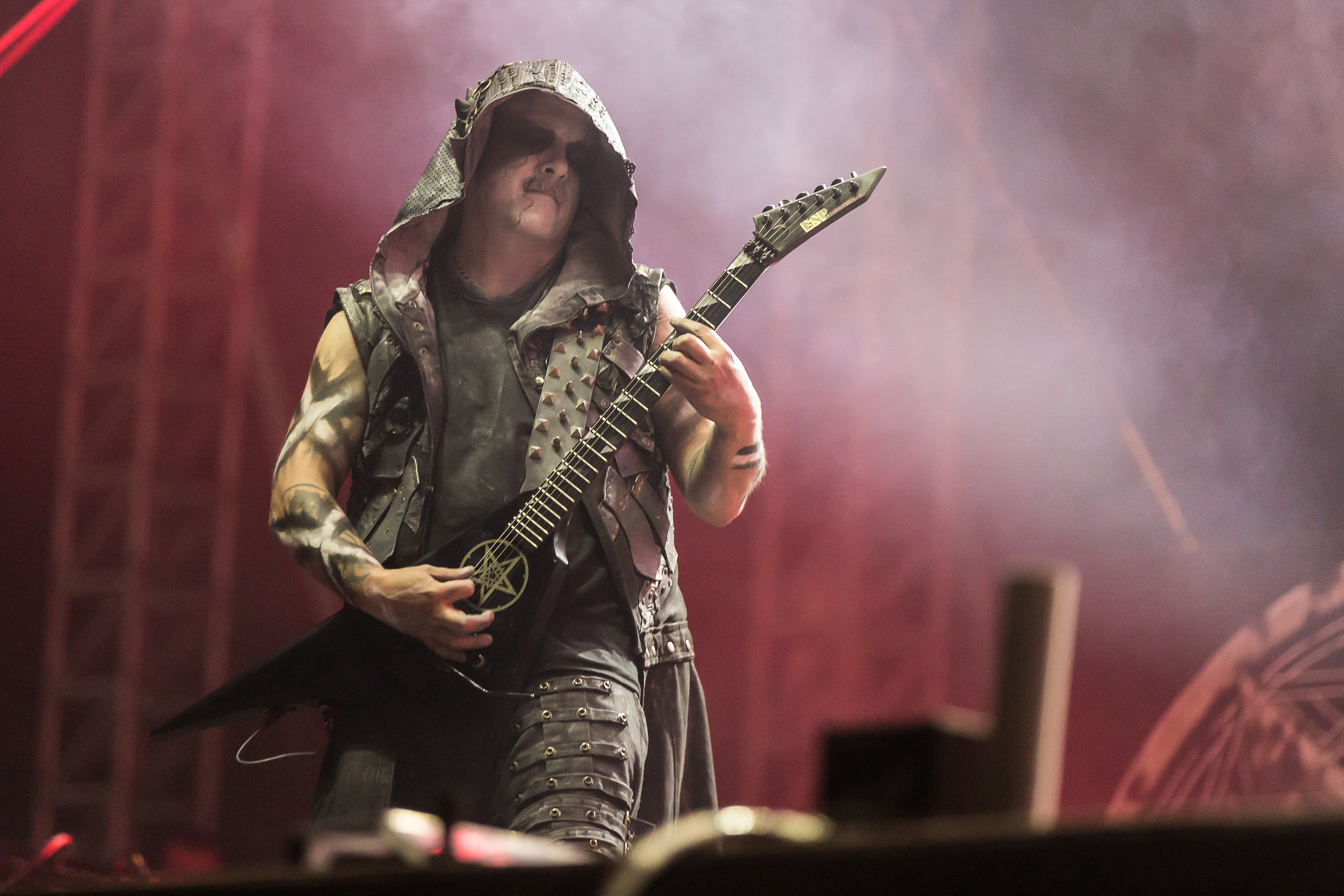
Former Lead guitarist Thomas Rune "Galder" Andersen at Rockharz Open Air 2019

After Stormblåst, keyboardist Stian Aarstad left the band to serve in the Norwegian army, thus being unable to participate in the 1996 recording of Devil's Path. That period was marked by the departure of bassist Brynjard Tristan and the arrival of Nagash. Stian Aarstad returned for the recording of 1997's Enthrone Darkness Triumphant. He had trouble attending rehearsals and was unable to tour. He was dismissed and replaced with Kimberly Goss for their 1997/1998 world tour. Enthrone Darkness Triumphant was a success for the band, and their first release on Nuclear Blast. The album was recorded in the Abyss Studios, owned by Hypocrisy's frontman Peter Tägtgren. After the release of Enthrone Darkness Triumphant, the band toured with In Flames, Dissection and other prominent bands.

=== Spiritual Black Dimensions and Puritanical Euphoric Misanthropia period ===
After the tour for Enthrone Darkness Triumphant, the band recruited Mustis on keyboards and Astennu on lead guitar. Dimmu Borgir's following full-length albums Spiritual Black Dimensions in 1999 and 2001's Puritanical Euphoric Misanthropia, met critical acclaim. Between the two albums, Nagash quit and was replaced with bassist/singer ICS Vortex, and Tjodalv left due to family commitments, and to form the band Susperia, to be replaced with Nick Barker of Cradle of Filth. Guitarist Astennu was fired due to creative differences, and was replaced with Galder.

=== Death Cult Armageddon and Stormblåst MMV period ===
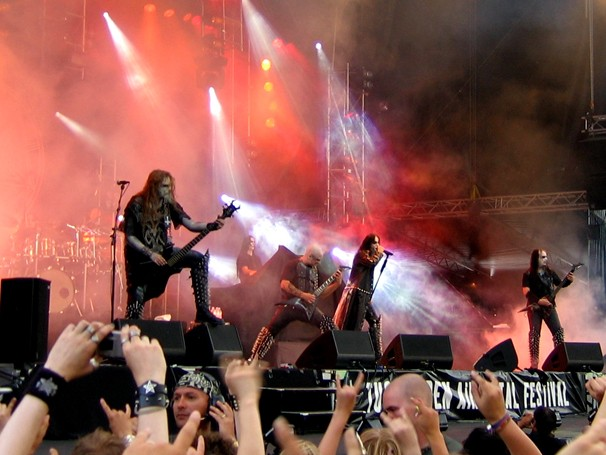
Dimmu Borgir performing in 2005

Despite the regular video play on MTV2 and Fuse that their follow-up album received, the band stated that they were not "commercially-oriented", and "simply wished to spread their message to more people". In 2003, Dimmu Borgir recorded Death Cult Armageddon with the Prague Philharmonic Orchestra, conducted by Adam Klemens. All orchestrations were arranged by Gaute Storaas (who had worked with Dimmu Borgir on Puritanical Euphoric Misanthropia). In 2004, Dimmu Borgir performed on the mainstage at Ozzfest.

In 2005, the band re-recorded Stormblåst, featuring Hellhammer of Mayhem as session drummer. The album featured a DVD with a live performance from the 2004 Ozzfest tour.

=== In Sorte Diaboli period ===
Dimmu Borgir's seventh studio album, In Sorte Diaboli, was released on 24 April 2007. A special edition version was released in a boxed case with a DVD, backward-printed lyrics, and a mirror. The album artwork was released on 14 February 2007 on a promotional webpage for the album. This album features drummer Hellhammer of Mayhem. Blomberg left the band mid-tour in 2007 because of a neck injury that limited movement on his right arm. With the release of this album, Dimmu Borgir became the first black metal band with a number one album on the charts in Norway. In October 2008, they released their second live DVD set, The Invaluable Darkness, based on several shows during the world tour supporting "In Sorte Diaboli". In 2008, the band played the UK festival Bloodstock.

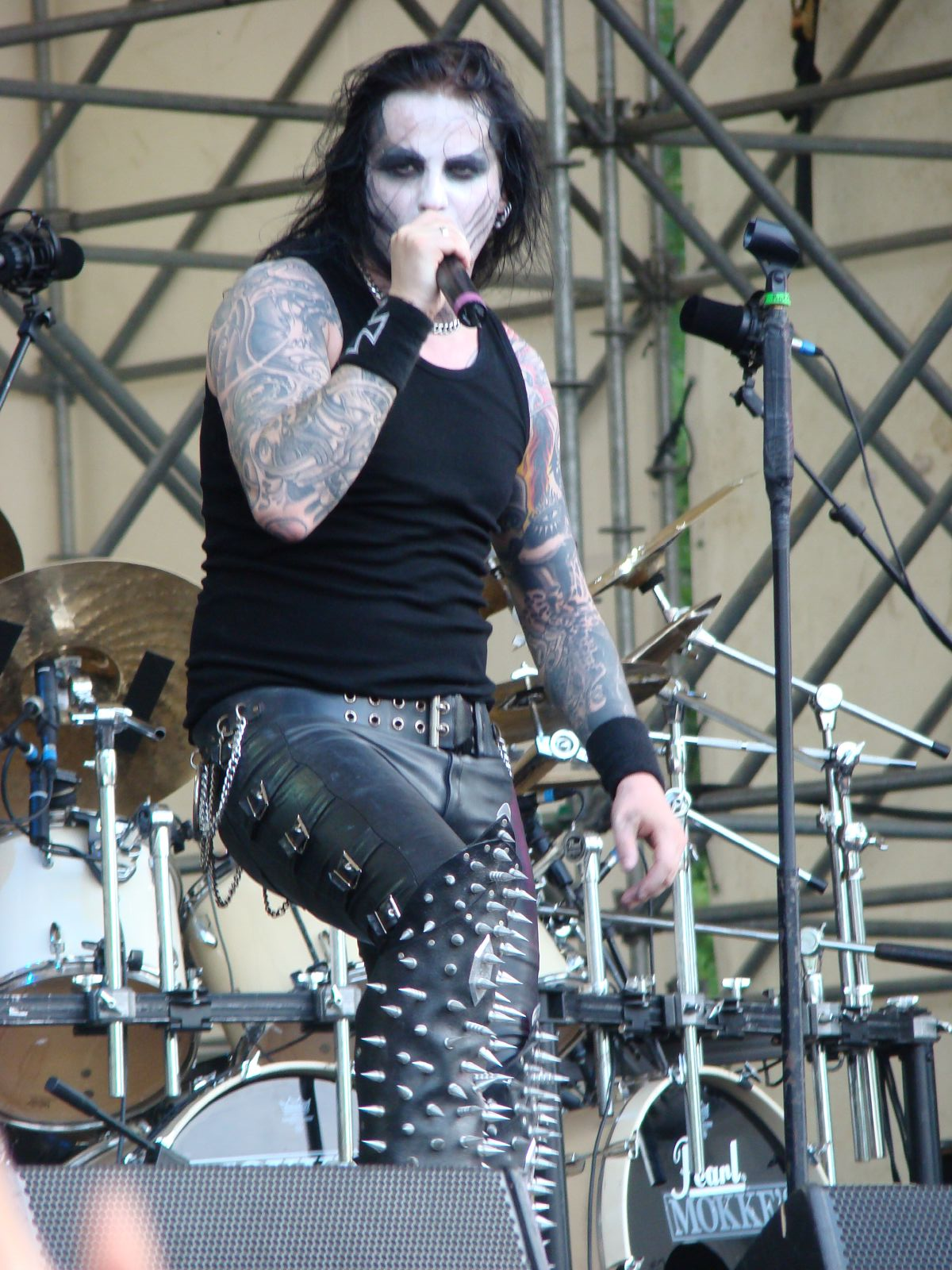
Shagrath performing on Gods of Metal 2007

In 2009, ICS Vortex and Mustis announced their departure from Dimmu Borgir. Mustis claimed disfavor with the band, stating that he was not properly credited for his writing contributions, mentioning possibly taking legal action.

Dimmu Borgir confirmed the pair's dismissal from the band, explaining why they were fired. Shagrath, Silenoz and Galder wrote: "Funny then, how the new album is half-way finished written already by the rest of us without any of these guys' input, still having all those elements we're known for."

=== Abrahadabra period ===
Dimmu Borgir's eighth studio album, Abrahadabra, was released on 24 September 2010 in Germany, 27 September 2010 for the rest of Europe and 12 October 2010 in North America. Silenoz explained that the increasingly long periods between albums were because the band had stopped writing while touring, which was affecting the quality of the music. He described the album as having an "eerie and haunting feel to it", adding that the material is "epic", "primal", atmospheric and ambient. A promotional image released with the statement showed Shagrath returning to keyboards. The album features the Kringkastingsorkestret (the Norwegian Broadcasting Orchestra), as well as the Schola Cantorum choir, totaling more than 100 musicians and singers.

Gaute Storaas, composer of the orchestral arrangements, released a statement on his role on the album. "Their music is epic, thematic and symphonic already from the creation; they are clearly having an orchestral approach to composing. My role in this is sometimes just to transcribe their themes, sometimes to take their ideas, tear them apart and build them back up in ways that are true to the band's intentions. The music must also be both interesting and playable for the musicians, and hopefully, meet the quality standards of the orchestral world."

On 8 July, the band confirmed that they had hired Swedish multi-instrumentalist Snowy Shaw (Therion, Dream Evil) to replace bassist/clean vocalist ICS Vortex on their then-upcoming album, Abrahadabra, and world tour. On 25 August, Snowy Shaw left Dimmu Borgir to rejoin Therion. On 17 September 2010, Dimmu Borgir released the song "Born Treacherous" from Abrahadabra on their official Myspace page. Then, on 24 September, the band announced they would stream Abrahadabra in its entirety until 7 p.m. EST that evening. The keyboards and bass were played by Gerlioz from Apoptygma Berzerk and Cyrus of Susperia respectively, and the clean vocals were sampled.

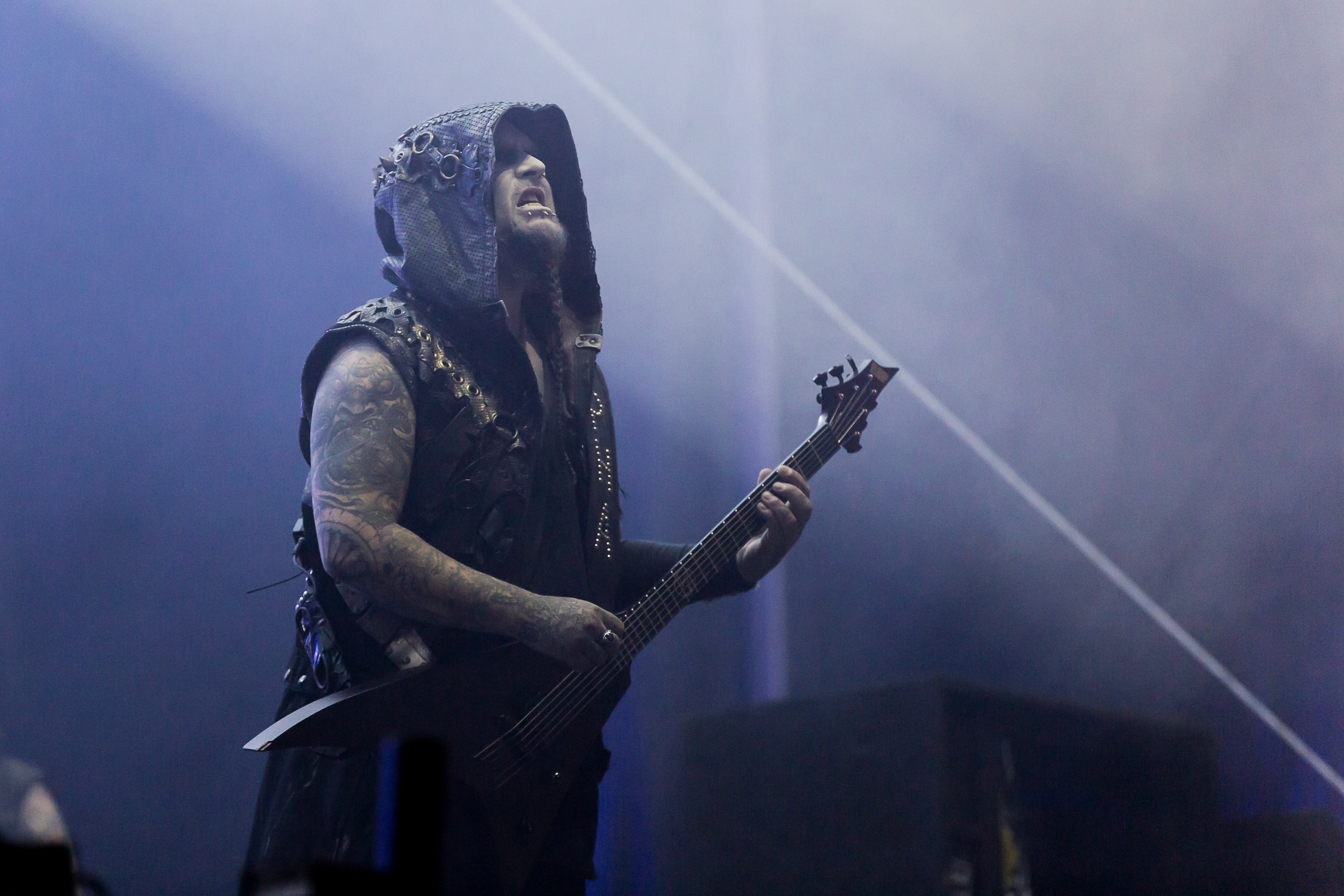
Rhythm guitarist Sven Atle "Erkekjetter Silenoz" Kopperud at Rockharz Open Air 2019

28 May 2011 saw Dimmu Borgir perform live with a full symphony orchestra and choir for the first time, in a one-off show with the Norwegian Broadcasting Orchestra and Schola Cantorum Choir (who collaborated on Abrahadabra the previous year) at the Oslo Spectrum, titled "Forces of the Northern Night". This was broadcast live on Norway's main national TV carrier NRK. The setlist consisted of tracks from Abrahadabra, "Vredysbyrd" and "Progenies of the Great Apocalypse" from Death Cult Armageddon, as well as updated versions of tracks from their back catalog; "The Serpentine Offering", "Kings of the Carnival Creation", and "Mourning Palace", which were re-orchestrated by Gaute Storaas. The band played a similar show the following year at the Wacken Open Air festival, having yet performed a second live show with a symphony orchestra and choir. This time, they were accompanied by the Czech National Orchestra with the same choir, being the second band in the festival's history to play with a live orchestra and choir (next to German power metal band Rage's 2007 performance). The show was broadcast live on Germany's Kultur TV arts channel. Silenoz said in several interviews that both live sets were fully mixed and would be accompanied by a feature-length documentary and bonus material when released. The band performed at Wacken Open Air in 2012. In late 2011-2012, the band went on a special tour for fans in various European countries, including playing in small venues, playing Enthrone Darkness Triumphant in its entirety, alongside an additional set of fan favourite tracks, following a poll to fans directly, asking which of their first three albums would they want to see played in full on their next European tour.

=== Forces of the Northern Night and Eonian ===
The band announced in August 2013 that work had begun on the band's next album. The production and release of the album were delayed. It was the second-longest gap between studio releases. Following various delays, the Oslo and Wacken Orchestra performances, recorded between 2011 and 2012, were released on CD/DVD/Blu-ray format on 28 April 2017 worldwide as their third live video release, Forces of the Northern Night. Silenoz revealed that the band was mixing the follow-up to Abrahadabra. Ten songs would feature on the next album, which they said had been completed. On 18 December 2017, it was announced that the first single from the album would be released on a 7-inch vinyl EP, titled Interdimensional Summit, released on 23 February 2018. Eonian was released on 4 May through Nuclear Blast, the band's first release of original material in almost eight years. A second song from the album, "Council of Wolves and Snakes", was available for streaming online on 30 March. On 28 May, it was announced that Victor Brandt (Entombed A.D., Firespawn) had officially joined as the band's touring bassist.

=== Grand Serpent Rising ===
According to the band members' Instagram accounts in September 2020, the band was writing and pre-producing their tenth studio album. Silenoz claimed the album wouldn't take long to release. He later took back this statement in December 2023, when he said the band would not rush the album, and said it would be finished when it was finished, and referred to the eight years it took Eonian to be released as the longest time it could take for the next album. This marked the second release by the band with time gap of around eight years, since their previous album. A cover album was released on 8 December 2023, Inspiratio Profanus. It contains all covers the band has recorded up to Abrahadabra.

On 30 March 2024, during a show in Norway, the band reunited with Tjodalv, ICS Vortex and Mustis for a live performance. On 18 August, Galder left Dimmu Borgir, playing his last show the day before at Dynamo Metal Fest. In December 2024, it was revealed on the band's official Instagram that they had entered the studio to record their tenth studio album. In September 2025, the band revealed that the new album had been recorded, mastered and completed. Grand Serpent Rising was released on 22 May 2026.

== Musical style and influences ==
Dimmu Borgir are considered to be a symphonic/melodic black metal band with progressive metal tendencies. The band's older releases (since 1994 to 1999) are, according to AllMusic journalist Bradley Torreano, strongly influenced by Darkthrone, Mayhem, Bathory, Emperor, Celtic Frost, Immortal, Venom, and Iron Maiden. The band became more progressive and symphonic through the years; many black metal purists consider the band's second album, Stormblåst, to be "the act's last true contribution to black metal". Enthrone Darkness Triumphant, Dimmu Borgir's third album, "distinguished itself in two important areas, firstly forgoing their native language for English and secondly for its dramatic increase in synthesizer content." Significant experimentation began with 1999's Spiritual Black Dimensions (due to the addition of Vortex's clean vocals, and the variety of musical ideas from then-new member Mustis), as well as Puritanical Euphoric Misanthropia due to addition of influences from composers such as Antonín Dvořák, Enya, Richard Wagner, and Frédéric Chopin. As the music strongly differed from the older, rawer black metal style, Jon "Metalion" Kristiansen called Spiritual Black Dimensions "a fine case of melodic, over-produced symphonic metal. If you like this melodic style I can't really think of anyone doing it better [...]. No, I wouldn't call this black metal. Read the interview with Funeral Mist for the right definition of black metal."

== Band members ==
=== Current ===
- Silenoz (Sven Atle Kopperud) – rhythm guitar (1993–present), lead vocals (1993–1995), bass (1993, 2009–present)
- Shagrath (Stian Tomt Thoresen) – lead vocals (1995–present), drums (1994–1995), lead guitar (1995–1997), keyboards, synthesizer, bass (1993, 2009–present)

=== Current session/touring musicians ===
- Daray (Dariusz Brzozowski) – drums (2008–present)
- Gerlioz (Geir Bratland) – keyboards, synthesizer (2010–present)
- Victor Brandt – bass (2018–present)
- Damage (Kjell Åge Karlsen) – lead guitar (2025–present)

== Discography ==
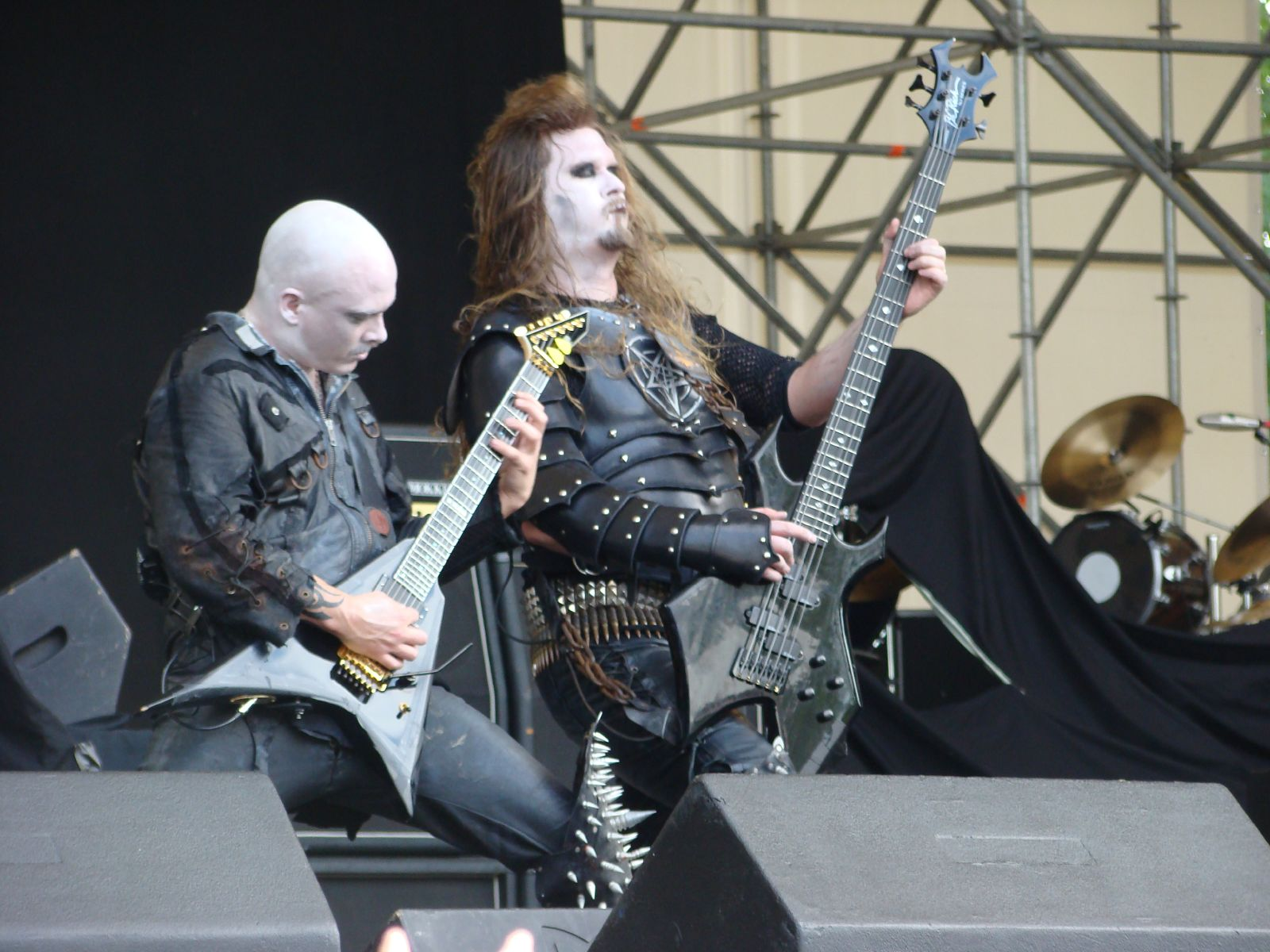
Ex-members Galder and ICS Vortex live at Gods of Metal Festival 2007

- For all tid (1995)
- Stormblåst (1996)
- Enthrone Darkness Triumphant (1997)
- Spiritual Black Dimensions (1999)
- Puritanical Euphoric Misanthropia (2001)
- Death Cult Armageddon (2003)
- In Sorte Diaboli (2007)
- Abrahadabra (2010)
- Eonian (2018)
- Grand Serpent Rising (2026)
