= Stormblåst =

1996 studio album by Dimmu Borgir

Studio album by Dimmu Borgir
- Released: 25 January 1996
- Recorded: July–September 1995
- Studios: Endless Sound Productions, Oslo, Norway
- Genres: Melodic black metal; symphonic black metal
- Length: 49:40
- Language: Norwegian
- Label: Cacophonous
- Producer: Dimmu Borgir

Dimmu Borgir chronology
| For all tid (1995) | Stormblåst (1996) | Devil's Path (1996) |

Stormblåst (English: Stormblown) is the second studio album by Norwegian symphonic black metal band Dimmu Borgir. It was released on 25 January 1996 through Cacophonous Records, re-released in 2001 by Century Media, and completely re-recorded in 2005, released as Stormblåst MMV (see below). It was Dimmu Borgir's last album sung entirely in the band's native Norwegian, as they would change to English afterwards. This is also the first album where Tjodalv switched to drums as opposed to guitar, the first where Shagrath is on vocals, though he took on the role of backing vocals, and this album was the band's last album with Silenoz on lead vocals, with him later switching to a backing vocal role with the band. With every subsequent release, Shagrath has been the lead vocalist. It is also the first album where Shagrath is the lead guitarist of every song. It is also the last album where lyrics would be written by Aldrahn (of Dødheimsgard and Ved Buens Ende) until 2003's Death Cult Armageddon, and the last album to feature Brynjard Tristan on bass.

More keyboards were employed for this album than previously by the band, and the guitars and bass became more musically textured.

== Stormblåst (original release) ==
The intro to "Guds fortapelse" is from Dvořák's Symphony no. 9 in E minor, Op. 95 From the New World.

The song "Sorgens Kammer" was plagiarized by keyboardist at the time, Stian Aarstad, from the title track of the Amiga game Agony. As a result, the song was left out of their re-recording of Stormblåst. The same thing applies for the intro to "Alt lys er svunnet hen", which plagiarized the song "Sacred Hour" by Magnum.

== Critical reception ==
Professional ratings
Review scores
| Source | Rating |
|---|---|
| AllMusic | 2.5/5 stars |
| Collector's Guide to Heavy Metal | 7/10 |
| Rock Hard | 9/10 |

AllMusic's review was unfavourable: "Lengthy, melancholy piano instrumentals, too many mid-paced tempos and an overabundance of goth-flavoured synth mush will test the patience of those looking for a more visceral approach..." In his review Martin Popoff hinted at some influence of Bathory and Viking metal in this album and appreciated how the folk melodies "transferred to power chords and riffs", concluding that Dimmu Borgir "wasn't getting the respect more difficult and less musical bands were getting."

=== Track listing ===
| No. | Title | Lyrics | Music | Length |
|---|---|---|---|---|
| 1. | "Alt lys er svunnet hen" ("All Light Has Faded Away") | Silenoz | Silenoz, Shagrath, Tony Clarkin, Aarstad | 6:07 |
| 2. | "Broderskapets ring" ("The Circle of Brotherhood") | Shagrath | Silenoz, Shagrath | 5:10 |
| 3. | "Når sjelen hentes til helvete" ("When the Soul Is Brought to Hell") | Silenoz | Silenoz | 4:33 |
| 4. | "Sorgens kammer" ("Chamber of Sorrow") | | Tim Wright, Aarstad | 6:21 |
| 5. | "Da den kristne satte livet til" ("When the Christian Lost His Life") | Silenoz | Silenoz | 3:08 |
| 6. | "Stormblåst" ("Stormblown") | Aldrahn | Silenoz, Shagrath | 6:16 |
| 7. | "Dødsferd" ("Journey of Death") | Shagrath | Shagrath | 5:30 |
| 8. | "Antikrist" ("Antichrist") | Silenoz, Shagrath | Silenoz, Shagrath | 3:43 |
| 9. | "Vinder fra en ensom grav" ("Winds from a Lonely Grave") | Aldrahn | Shagrath | 4:28 |
| 10. | "Guds fortapelse - åpenbaring av dommedag" ("God's Damnation - Revelation of Judgment Day") | Silenoz | Shagrath | 4:24 |
| Total length: | | | | 49:40 |

== Stormblåst MMV ==
Stormblåst

Studio album of re-recorded songs by Dimmu Borgir
- Released: 11 November 2005
- Recorded: 2005
- Studios: The Abyss, Pärlby, Sweden
- Genres: Melodic black metal; symphonic black metal
- Length: 51:14
- Language: Norwegian
- Label: Nuclear Blast
- Producers: Shagrath, Silenoz

Dimmu Borgir chronology
| Death Cult Armageddon (2003) | Stormblåst (2005) | In Sorte Diaboli (2007) |

Professional ratings
Review scores
| Source | Rating |
|---|---|
| Chronicles of Chaos | 7/10 |
| Rock Hard | 8.5/10 |
| Metal Storm | 4/10 |

Stormblåst MMV (sometimes referred to as Stormblåst 2005 Version or Stormblåst Re-Recorded) is the re-recorded album by Norwegian symphonic black metal band Dimmu Borgir, released on 11 November 2005 by Nuclear Blast. It features re-recorded songs of the band's 1996 album Stormblåst. The album was re-recorded entirely by Silenoz and Shagrath with guest appearances from Hellhammer and Mustis. It also has two new studio tracks, "Sorgens Kammer – Del II" and "Avmaktslave". The album included a bonus DVD with five live songs performed at Ozzfest 2004 and the American version included a free cloth patch. It is the last release with Shagrath as lead guitarist.

=== Removal of material ===
The instrumental "Sorgens Kammer" from the original album could not be re-recorded due to copyright issues associated with the 1992 Amiga game Agony, as then-keyboardist Stian Aarstad had passed the song off as his own. Similarly, for the intro to "Alt Lys Er Svunnet Hen", Aarstad used parts from the Magnum song "Sacred Hour"; for this reason, the intro is not part of the song on this re-recorded version.

=== Track listing ===
| No. | Title | Length |
|---|---|---|
| 1. | "Alt lys er svunnet hen" ("All Light Has Faded Away") | 4:44 |
| 2. | "Broderskapets ring" ("The Ring of Brotherhood") | 5:30 |
| 3. | "Når sjelen hentes til helvete" ("When the Soul Is Brought to Hell") | 4:43 |
| 4. | "Sorgens kammer - del II" ("The Chamber of Sorrow - Part II") | 5:51 |
| 5. | "Da den kristne satte livet til" ("When the Christian Lost His Life") | 3:03 |
| 6. | "Stormblåst" ("Stormblown") | 6:10 |
| 7. | "Dødsferd" ("Journey of Death") | 5:42 |
| 8. | "Antikrist" ("Antichrist") | 3:36 |
| 9. | "Vinder fra en ensom grav" ("Winds from a Lonely Grave") | 4:00 |
| 10. | "Guds fortapelse - åpenbaring av dommedag" ("God's Perdition - Revelation of Judgment Day") | 4:01 |
| 11. | "Avmaktslave" ("Slave of Impotency" or "Powerlessness") | 3:54 |

Bonus DVD – Live at Ozzfest
| No. | Title | Length |
|---|---|---|
| 1. | "Spellbound (By the Devil)" | 4:20 |
| 2. | "Vredesbyrd" ("Burden of Wrath") | 4:48 |
| 3. | "Kings of the Carnival Creation" | 8:07 |
| 4. | "Progenies of the Great Apocalypse" | 5:25 |
| 5. | "Mourning Palace" | 5:45 |

== Personnel ==
=== Original release ===
Dimmu Borgir

- Erkekjetter Silenoz – lead vocals, rhythm guitar
- Shagrath – lead guitar, backing vocals
- Brynjard Tristan – bass
- Stian Aarstad – keyboards, synthesizers, piano
- Tjodalv – drums

Additional personnel

- Christophe Szpajdel – logo

=== 2005 re-recording ===
- Shagrath – lead vocals, guitars, bass
- Silenoz – rhythm guitar, backing vocals, lead guitar, bass
- Mustis – keyboards, piano
- Hellhammer – drums

Members featured in bonus DVD

- Galder – lead guitar
- ICS Vortex – bass, clean vocals
- Tony Laureano – drums

== Charts ==
| Chart (2005) | Peak position |
|---|---|
| Norwegian Albums (VG-lista) | 24 |
| German Albums (Offizielle Top 100) | 87 |
| French Albums (SNEP) | 183 |
