= Stian Aarstad =

Norwegian pianist and keyboard player

- Born: Stian Aarstad
- Origin: Jessheim, Norway
- Genres: Heavy metal, symphonic black metal, electronica
- Occupations: Musician, songwriter, record producer
- Instruments: Keyboards, piano, synthesizers
- Formerly of: Dimmu Borgir; Enthral; Old Man's Child

Stian Aarstad is a Norwegian pianist and keyboard player best known for his four-year (1993–1997) stint with the symphonic black metal band Dimmu Borgir during which he played keyboards and synthesizers

== Career ==
Aarstad was Dimmu Borgir's keyboardist from 1993 to 1997, contributing to the band's early releases before being dismissed after difficulties fulfilling the band's touring commitments. Dimmu Borgir's second album Stormblåst (1996) was criticised for plagiarism. Aarstad was accused of plagiarising the Magnum track "Sacred Hour" in the opening song "Alt lys er svunnet hen" ("All Light Has Faded Away"), as well as the title track of the Amiga game Agony for the song "Sorgens kammer" ("Chamber of Sorrow"). The band re-recorded the album in 2005, omitting these tracks.

In 1998 to 1999, he produced a demo for the unblack metal band Vaakevandring, which was later re-released as a self-titled EP in 2004. In the 2000s, Aarstad had been the pianist for the band Enthral, but left his regular position during the recording of the band's third album.

In 2005, Aarstad joined the electronica/pop music act Karatkorn.
