= Silenoz =

Norwegian guitarist (born 1977)

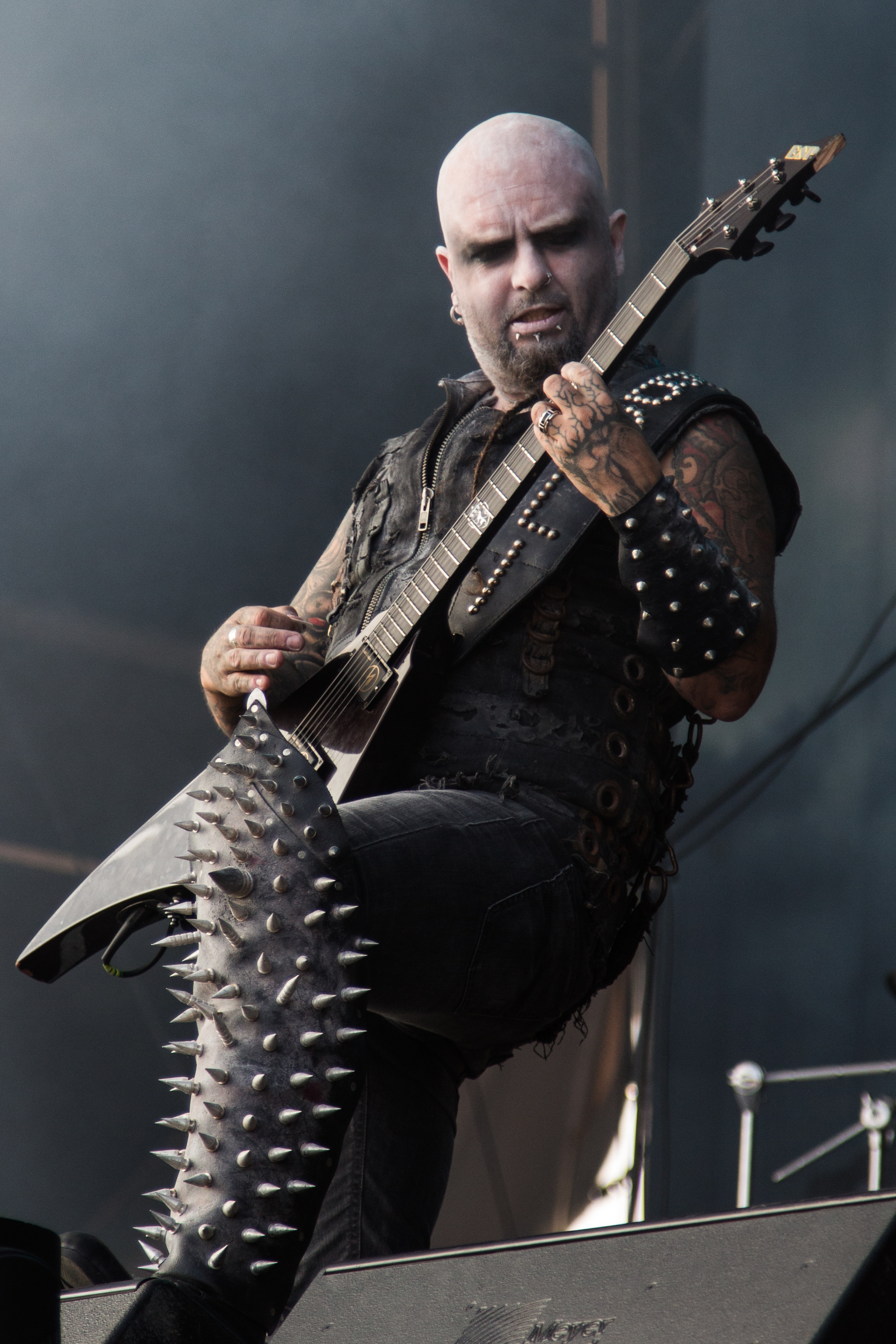
- Silenoz at the See-Rock Festival 2014

Background information
- Also known as: Ed Damnator, Erkekjetter Silenoz
- Born: Sven Atle Kopperud; 1 March 1977 (age 49); Nannestad, Norway
- Genres: Symphonic black metal, melodic black metal, thrash metal, blackened death metal
- Occupations: Musician, songwriter
- Instruments: Guitar, vocals, bass
- Years active: 1992–present
- Member of: Dimmu Borgir, Insidious Disease
- Formerly of: Nocturnal Breed

Sven Atle Kopperud (born 1 March 1977), known professionally as Silenoz, is a Norwegian guitarist who is a founding member, along with Shagrath and Tjodalv, of the symphonic black metal band Dimmu Borgir, of which he is the primary songwriter. He is also guitarist for the death metal supergroup Insidious Disease.

== Biography ==
Silenoz has been Dimmu Borgir's guitarist since they started. He also composes and writes lyrics for most of the band's songs. He contributed vocals (on Stormblåst, its re-recording, and Godless Savage Garden) and bass (on Stormblåst MMV). He also sang lead vocals on their debut album For All Tid. At first, he was known only as Erkekjetter Silenoz (Arch-Heretic Silenoz in Norwegian).

Another band Silenoz, or "Ed Damnator" as he was called, played rhythm guitar and occasional bass in the Norwegian thrash metal band Nocturnal Breed. Before becoming a musician, Silenoz used to work in a kindergarten.

Silenoz has written the majority of Dimmu Borgir's lyrics and also based the songs in the album In Sorte Diaboli on a narrative of his composition.

Silenoz was featured as a voice actor in the Adult Swim cartoon Metalocalypse. This episode kicked off the second season of the popular show and debuted on Adult Swim Fix on Friday 21 September 2007.

Silenoz originally played bass, but he 'felt limited by only four strings'. He has played guitar since 1991, saying that he was inspired to play the guitar by Judas Priest, Randy Rhoads and Eddie Van Halen – in his words 'Real guitar players'.

For many years as guitarist in Dimmu Borgir, Silenoz appeared with long hair. However, as of 2012 he has appeared with a shaven head whilst maintaining a beard and various piercings.

== Stage name ==
Silenoz explained in an interview that his stage-name is derived from an alternative Latinised spelling of the Greek "Silenus," the name of a satyr-like being in Greek mythology who was a tutor to the wine god Dionysus, and was said to possess special knowledge and the power of prophecy while intoxicated. In the early days of the band, he used as stage name Erkekjetter Silenoz (erkekjetter being Norwegian for "arch heretic"), having it shortened later to Silenoz.

== Equipment ==
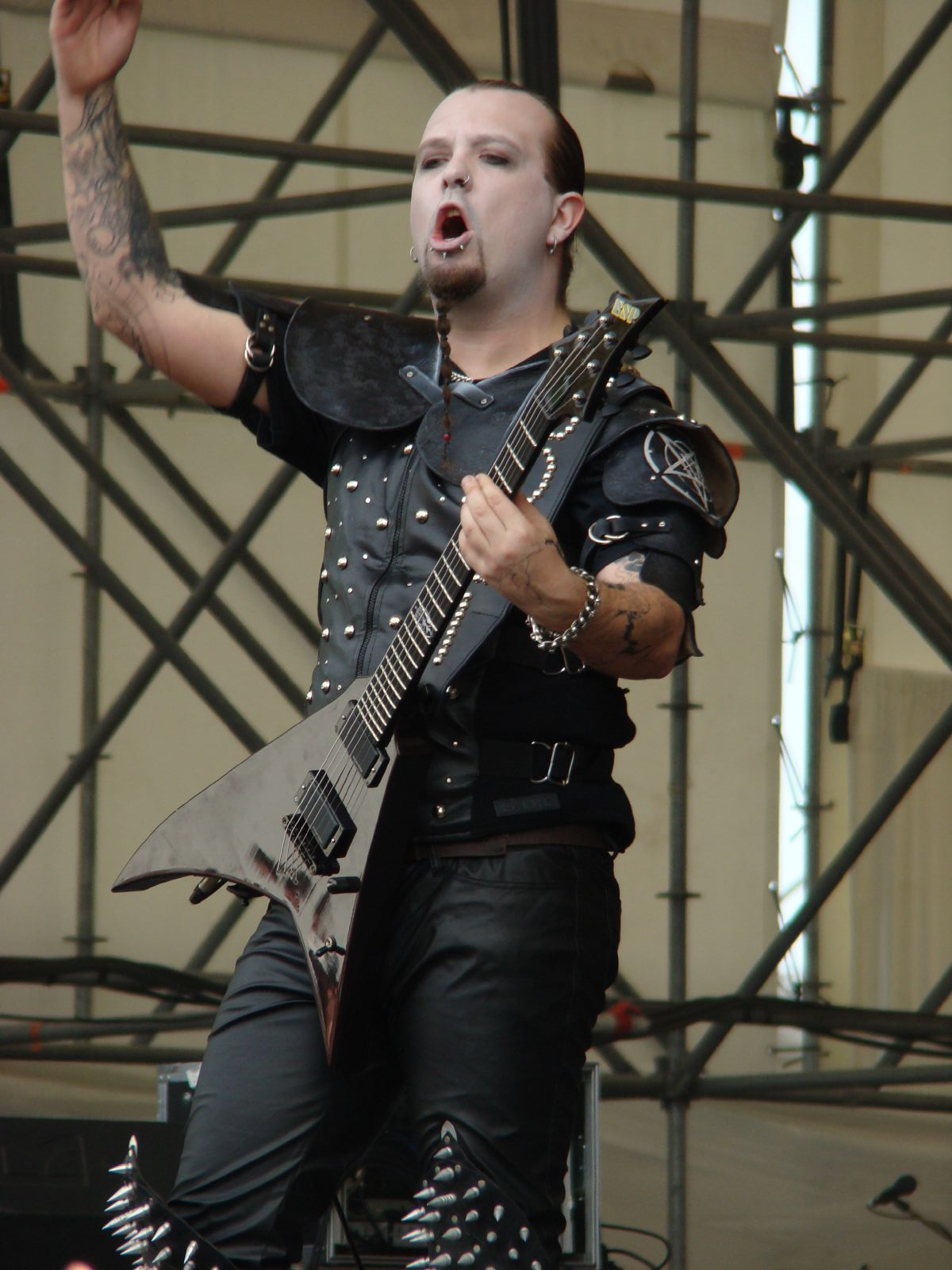
Silenoz with Dimmu Borgir at Gods of Metal 2007

- ESP Okkultist Custom V guitars (Maroon & Natural Finishes)
- ESP SV Series guitars
- ESP Viper guitar
- Jackson Guitars (formerly)
- Seymour Duncan pickups (formerly)
- EMG Pickups (formerly)
- Fishman Fluence pickups
- Marshall amplifiers (formerly)
- Mesa Boogie amplifiers (formerly)
- ENGL amplifiers (formerly)
- Blackstar amplifiers (formerly)
- Kemper Amps Profiler
- MLC Guitar Electronics amplifiers and pedals
- MLC Guitar Electronics signature S_bzero 93 amplifier
- Boss guitar effects
- Dean Markley – Blue Steel guitar strings
- Dunlop Tortex picks
- Shure wire-less systems

== Videography ==
- Behind the Player: Dimmu Borgir (DVD, 2010, Alfred Music Publishing)
