= List of symphonic black metal bands =

This is a list of bands that perform symphonic black metal, a form of black metal music that incorporates symphonic and orchestral styles and instrumentation.

== List of bands ==
Band	Country	Formed	Notes
Abigail Williams	US	2005	
Anorexia Nervosa	France	1995	
Antestor	Norway	1990	
Apostasy	Sweden	2000	
Bal-Sagoth	England	1989	
Banshee	US	2018	
Bishop of Hexen	Israel	1994	
Carach Angren	Netherlands	2003	
Carpathian Forest	Norway	1992	
Catamenia	Finland	1995	
Chthonic	Taiwan	1995	
Cradle of Filth	England	1991	
Crimson Moonlight	Sweden	1997	
Darzamat	Poland	1995	
Demonic Resurrection	India	2000	
Diabolical Masquerade	Sweden	1993	
Dimmu Borgir	Norway	1993	
Dismal Euphony	Norway	1994	
Dragonlord	US	2000	
Emperor	Norway	1991	
Equilibrium	Germany	2001	
Graveworm	Italy	1992	
Havoc Unit	Finland	1995	
Hecate Enthroned	England	1993	
Kekal	Indonesia	1995	
Lemuria	Belgium	2001	
Limbonic Art	Norway	1993	
Obtained Enslavement	Norway	1989	
Old Man's Child	Norway	1993	
Opera IX	Italy	1988	
Samsas Traum	Germany	1996	
Shade Empire	Finland	1999	
Stormlord	Italy	1991	
Tiamat	Sweden	1988	
Tvangeste	Russia	1996	
Twilight Ophera	Finland	1996	
Vaakevandring	Norway	1999	
Vardøger	Norway	1994	
Vesania	Poland	1997	
Welicoruss	Russia	2005	
