= Virulent Rapture =

Studio album by Hecate Enthroned
- Released: 25 November 2013
- Genre: Symphonic black metal
- Length: 55:28
- Label: Crank Music Group
- Producer: Mike Smith

Hecate Enthroned chronology
Redimus (2004)	Virulent Rapture (2013)	Embrace the Godless Aeon (2019)

Virulent Rapture is the fifth studio album by British band Hecate Enthroned, and their first album of new material since 2004's Redimus. It was released on 25 November 2013 via Crank Music Group, being their first album to be so, as well as their only release with vocalist Elliot Beaver and first with drummer Gareth Hardy on the line-up, who replaced long-time vocalist and drummer Dean Seddon and Robert Kendrick, respectively (both were fired in 2012).

== Background ==
The album was initially announced on a 21 January 2013 interview with webzine RoarRock.

The band announced on their official Twitter on 8 July 2013 that the new album was finished, "aside from some mixing and mastering issues", and that they were "looking at a self-release in the next few months". According to the band by then, the album was scheduled to be released on late November or early December 2013.

On 18 September 2013, Hecate announced they signed to a new label, Crank Music Group, and that it would release their album circa November.

On 23 October 2013, the artwork for Virulent Rapture was unveiled via Blabbermouth.net, and its release date was revealed as being on 25 November 2013. On the same day, a small, 21-second teaser of the track "Unchained" was posted by Crank Music Group on their official YouTube channel.

The track "To Wield the Hand of Perdition" was released online (via Crank Music Group's YouTube channel) on 19 November 2013.

Sarah Jezebel Deva, famous for her work with Angtoria and Cradle of Filth, provides additional vocals for the album's self-titled track.

On 20 June 2014, a music video was made for "Abyssal March". It is Hecate Enthroned's first music video since "An Ode for a Haunted Wood", made in 1995.

== Track listing ==
The album's track listing was unveiled by Crank Music Group on their official website on 28 October 2013.

No.	Title	Length
1.	"Thrones of Shadow"	4:46
2.	"Unchained"	4:37
3.	"Abyssal March"	4:08
4.	"Plagued by Black Death"	7:59
5.	"Euphoria"	4:43
6.	"Virulent Rapture" (feat. Sarah Jezebel Deva)	5:30
7.	"Life"	5:19
8.	"To Wield the Hand of Perdition"	3:05
9.	"Of Witchery and the Blood Moon"	5:33
10.	"Immateria" (instrumental)	3:05
11.	"Paths of Silence"	6:43

== Personnel ==
Hecate Enthroned

- Elliot Beaver – vocals
- Nigel Dennen – guitar
- Andy Milnes – guitar
- Dylan Hughes – bass guitar
- Pete White – keyboards
- Gareth Hardy – drums

Guest musicians

- Sarah Jezebel Deva – additional vocals on "Virulent Rapture"

Miscellaneous staff

- Mike Smith – production, engineering, mixing
- Kami Kopat – mixing, mastering, graphic layout
- Néstor Avalos – cover art
