= The Goat of Mendes (album) =

Studio album by Akercocke
- Released: 11 September 2001
- Recorded: April 2001
- Genre: Blackened death metal
- Length: 56:38
- Label: Peaceville
- Producer: Martin Bonsoir, Akercocke

Akercocke chronology
Rape of the Bastard Nazarene (1999)	The Goat of Mendes (2001)	Choronzon (2003)

Professional ratings
Review scores
Source	Rating
Chronicles of Chaos	8.5/10
Kerrang!	favourable
Rock Sound	favourable
Terrorizer	favourable

The Goat of Mendes is the second studio album by English death metal band Akercocke. It was released on 11 September 2001, through Peaceville Records.

== Release ==
The Goat of Mendes was released in standard and digipak CD format. The album included a music video for "Infernal Rites". A video for "Horns of Baphomet" was also released in 2001.

Dean Seddon, at the time vocalist of symphonic black metal band Hecate Enthroned, provided backing vocals for the track "The Serpent".

== Track listing ==
All lyrics are written by David Gray; all music is composed by Akercocke, except where noted.

No.	Title	Length
1.	"Of Menstrual Blood and Semen"	6:25
2.	"A Skin for Dancing In"	7:17
3.	"Betwixt Iniquitatis and Prostigiators"	2:12
4.	"Horns of Baphomet"	7:06
5.	"Masks of God"	4:51
6.	"The Serpent"	3:47
7.	"Fortune My Foe" (traditional)	1:16
8.	"Infernal Rites"	4:29
9.	"He Is Risen"	4:47
10.	"Breaking Silence"	4:15
11.	"Initiation"	1:11
12.	"Ceremony of Nine Angles"	8:53

== Personnel ==
Akercocke

- Jason Mendonça – vocals, guitars (solos (1, 2, 4, 5, 9)), trumpet
- Paul Scanlan – guitars (solos (1, 2, 4, 5, 8, 9, 10))
- Peter Theobalds – bass, art design
- David Gray – drums
- Martin Bonsoir – keyboards, programming, cello, mixing, engineering, production

Additional personnel

- Noel Summerville – mastering
- Vanessa Gray – violin
- Joanna Surmacz – photography
