= Redimus =

Studio album by Hecate Enthroned
- Released: 3 May 2004
- Recorded: 2004
- Genres: Symphonic black metal, blackened death metal
- Length: 45:57
- Label: Blackend Records
- Producers: Phil Green, Hecate Enthroned

Hecate Enthroned chronology
Miasma (2001)	Redimus (2004)	Virulent Rapture (2013)

Professional ratings
Review scores
Source	Rating
AllMusic	3/5 stars
Scream Magazine	4/6 stars

Redimus (Latin for We Return) is the fourth studio album by British symphonic black metal band Hecate Enthroned. It was released on 3 May 2004 by Blackend Records. It was their last album to be released by Blackend, as well as their last one to feature Dean Seddon on vocals and Rob Kendrick on drums. It was also their first release to feature Pete White on the keyboards.

Redimus continues along the sound originally heard on Kings of Chaos, with death metal-style guitars, tempos and growls mixed with symphonic black metal keyboards, melodies and grim screaming. There are also elements of progressive tendencies, as evidenced in the title track and "Morbeea", an acoustic track heavily influenced by Spanish flamenco music.

Jason Mendonça of Akercocke fame guest-stars on the track "An Eternal Belief".

The drawing used as the album's cover is "Saint Michael Fighting the Dragon", an engraving by Albrecht Dürer.

== Track listing ==
All tracks are written by Hecate Enthroned.

No.	Title	Length
1.	"Intro" (instrumental)	1:07
2.	"Soil of Sin"	2:57
3.	"Headhunter"	4:19
4.	"No One Hears"	3:30
5.	"The Face of Betrayal"	4:02
6.	"As Fire"	5:00
7.	"The Shining Delight"	2:24
8.	"An Eternal Belief (I Am Born, Part III)" (feat. Jason Mendonça)	4:37
9.	"Morbeea" (instrumental)	3:59
10.	"Redimus"	5:14
11.	"Choose Misanthropy"	4:42
12.	"Overriding Imagination"	3:54
Total length:		45:57

== Personnel ==
Hecate Enthroned

- Dean Seddon — vocals
- Andy Milnes — guitar
- Rob Kendrick — drums, percussion
- Dylan Hughes — bass guitar
- Pete White — keyboards
- Nigel Dennen — guitar

Guest musicians

- Jason Mendonça — backing vocals on "An Eternal Belief"

Miscellaneous staff

- Phil Green — engineering, production, mixing
