= Fascinator (album) =

Studio album by Master's Hammer
- Released: 10 February 2018
- Recorded: 2017
- Studio: Hellsound Studio
- Genre: Black metal, avant-garde metal
- Length: 50:07
- Label: Jihosound Records
- Producer: Franta Štorm

Master's Hammer chronology
Formulæ (2016)	Fascinator (2018)

Fascinator is the eighth studio album by Czech black metal band Master's Hammer. It was released on 10 February 2018 through their own label, Jihosound Records, and is available in vinyl, CD and cassette formats.

It is their first release since Vracejte konve na místo. to count with the participation of guitarist Petr "Blackie" Hošek (a former member of another important Czech black metal band, Root) as an official member, their first one since Mantras with former timpani player Honza "Silenthell" Přibyl, and the first one overall with new bassist Petr "Rámus" Mecák.

Two tracks of the album, "Ve věži ticha" and "Estetika ďábla", were uploaded to vocalist Franta Štorm's official YouTube channel as teasers on 11 September and 22 November 2017, respectively.

Štorm claims on the album's liner notes that most of its writing process were inspired by trips he took to Goa, India (a common destination for him), and Norway (Master's Hammer performed at a festival in Bergen in 2017). "Linkola" is a tribute to the Finnish philosopher Pentti Linkola.

Track 11's title is in Portuguese.

Somewhere during 2020, roughly two years after the album's release, the band officially disbanded. This was, however, only confirmed by founding member and band leader Franta Storm almost four years later, in an interview.

== Critical reception ==
The album was positively reviewed upon its release. MetalReviews.com, giving it a grade of 85/100, praised its "eerie atmosphere", calling it a "weird and theatrical" album and comparing it favorably to the sonority of Japanese band Sigh. Metal Invader rated it with a 4.5 out of 6, comparing Master's Hammer to American band Psychotic Waltz and saying the album was a huge improvement over the "rather mediocre" Formulæ. Decibel Magazine noticed its "more atmospheric sound", praising its "great riffs and a punishing rhythm section".

== Track listing ==
All tracks are written by Franta Štorm.

No.	Title	English title	Length
1.	"Fascinator"		3:37
2.	"Psychoparasit"	Psychoparasite	4:19
3.	"Ve věži ticha"	In the Tower of Silence	4:14
4.	"Linkola"		3:18
5.	"Satanská nekrofilní porna"	Satanic Necrophiliac Porn	4:18
6.	"Estetika ďábla"	Aesthetics of the Devil	3:59
7.	"Krokodil"		3:47
8.	"Astrální dvojníci"	Astral Doppelgangers	4:04
9.	"Kletba"	Curse	3:26
10.	"Odliv mozků"	Brain Drain	2:36
11.	"Espíritos Criativos"	Creative Spirits	3:33
12.	"Exhumace"	Exhumation	3:42
13.	"Lost in Fjords" (instrumental)		4:02

- Tracks 12 and 13 were not included on the vinyl issue of the album.

== Personnel ==
- František "Franta" Štorm – vocals, electric guitar, keyboards, production, cover art
- Petr "Blackie" Hošek – froggish solos, rhythm guitar
- Jan "Honza" Kapák – drums, guitar harmonies
- Honza "Silenthell" Přibyl – timpani
- Petr "Rámus" Mecák – bass guitar
- Tomáš "Necrocock" Kohout – sickly vocals, harmonies
- Tom Renter – shout (track 4)
- Ondřej Pospíšil – mastering
