= Formulæ (album) =

Studio album by Master's Hammer
- Released: 30 May 2016
- Recorded: January–March 2016
- Studio: Biotech Studio, Prague, Czech Republic
- Genre: Black metal, avant-garde metal
- Length: 55:53
- Label: Jihosound Records
- Producer: Franta Štorm

Master's Hammer chronology
Vagus Vetus (2014)	Formulæ (2016)	Fascinator (2018)

Formulæ is the seventh studio album by Czech black metal band Master's Hammer, released on 30 May 2016 through the band's own record label, Jihosound Records, founded in 2013. The album was composed by Franta Štorm in India and South Bohemia in winter 2015–2016, and recorded between January and March 2016 at Biotech Studio in Prague, Czech Republic.

Formulæ features the same experimental style of its immediate predecessors, with a mixture of melodic black metal and ambient sounds, in the middle of the Štorm's death growl vocals.

On 31 August 2016 the band uploaded a music video to the track "Maso z kosmu" on their official YouTube channel; it is the band's first music video since "Černá svatozář" and "Géniové" (both from 1991).

The album won the Anděl Award 2016 in the category Hard & Heavy; it is Master's Hammer second release to win the award, following Vracejte konve na místo. from 2012.

The track "Votava" is a tribute to Czech outsider artist Antonín Votava (1943–2009).

== Track listing ==
All lyrics are written by Franta Štorm; all music is composed by Master's Hammer (Štorm, Necrocock and Honza Kapák).

No.	Title	English title	Length
1.	"Den nicoty"	Day of Nothingness	3:40
2.	"Maso z kosmu"	Meat from Space	4:13
3.	"Votava"		3:29
4.	"Shy Gecko"		3:18
5.	"Arachnid"		3:53
6.	"Všem jebne"	Everyone Goes Mad	3:26
7.	"Biologické hodiny"	Biological Clock	4:13
8.	"Phenakistoscope" (instrumental)		3:11
9.	"DMT"		3:49
10.	"Podburka"		3:07
11.	"Jazyky"	Languages	4:34
12.	"Durga chce pít"	Durga Wants to Drink	4:11
13.	"Rurální dobro"	Rural Dobro	4:23
14.	"Ukolébavka"	Lullaby	3:47
15.	"Aya"		2:39

== Personnel ==
- František "Franta" Štorm – vocals, guitar, bass, drums, samples, production, cover art
- Tomáš "Necrocock" Kohout – guitar
- Jan "Honza" Kapák – drums (except tracks 2, 5 and 9)
- Václav Matas – dobro guitar (track 13)
- Ecson Waldes – mastering

== Notes ==
- Mixed in April 2016.
