= Miasma (EP) =

EP by Hecate Enthroned
- Released: 4 July 2001
- Recorded: Elevator Studios, Liverpool, 2001
- Genre: Symphonic black metal, blackened death metal
- Length: 26:41
- Label: Blackend Records
- Producer: Pete Coleman

Hecate Enthroned chronology
Kings of Chaos (1999)	Miasma (2001)	Redimus (2004)

Miasma is an EP by the British band Hecate Enthroned that was released on 4 July 2001 via Blackend Records. It has six tracks, one of which is a hidden bonus cover of Venom's "Buried Alive".

Miasma is also the last release by Hecate Enthroned to feature keyboardist Darren "Daz" Bishop.

== Track listing ==
All tracks are written by Hecate Enthroned, except for "Buried Alive" by Conrad "Cronos" Lant, Jeff "Mantas" Dunn and Tony "Abaddon" Bray

No.	Title	Length
1.	"So-Called Saviour"	4:52
2.	"New Day Emerges"	4:26
3.	"Commence the Chaos" (instrumental)	1:11
4.	"Designed with Hate"	3:22
5.	"Silenced but for Their Cries (I Am Born, Part II)" (The song "Silenced but for Their Cries (I Am Born, Part II)" ends at 3:32. After 2 minutes of silence, at 5:32, begins the hidden song "Buried Alive".)	9:12
Total length:		26:41

== Personnel ==
Hecate Enthroned

- Dean Seddon – vocals
- Andy Milnes – guitar
- Nigel Dennen – guitar
- Darren Bishop – keyboards
- Dylan Hughes – bass
- Rob Kendrick – drums, percussion

Miscellaneous staff

- Pete "Pee-Wee" Coleman – production, engineering
