= Krupička =

Krupička (feminine: Krupičková) is a Czech surname. It directly translates as 'Fine Semolina'.

== People ==
- Anton Krupicka (born 1983), American ultra-runner
- Jarda Krupicka (born 1946), Czech-American ice hockey player
- Jiří Krupička (1913–2014) Czech geologist
- Martina Krupičková (born 1975), Czech artist
- Miroslav Krupička, director of Radio Prague
- Rob Krupicka (born 1971), American politician
- Rudolf Krupička (1879–1951), Czech dramatist
- Zdeněk Krupička, Czech ice sledge hockey player who represented Czech Republic at the 2014 Winter Paralympics
