= Kings of Chaos =

Kings of Chaos may refer to:

- Kings of Chaos (album), a 1999 album by Hecate Enthroned
- Kings of Chaos (band), a rock supergroup
