= Dark Requiems... and Unsilent Massacre =

Studio album by Hecate Enthroned
- Released: 1998
- Recorded: 16 February/3 March 1998
- Genre: Symphonic black metal
- Length: 42:50
- Label: Blackend Records
- Producer: Pete Coleman

Hecate Enthroned chronology
The Slaughter of Innocence, a Requiem for the Mighty (1997)	Dark Requiems... and Unsilent Massacre (1998)	Kings of Chaos (1999)

Dark Requiems... and Unsilent Massacre is the second full-length album by the British symphonic black metal act Hecate Enthroned, released in 1998 by Blackend Records.

Stylistically this found the band utilising a slower, more ambient feel versus the speed and heaviness heard on their previous album, The Slaughter of Innocence. Keyboards and reverbed vocals were put more in the forefront, with less emphasis on guitar riffs and fast-paced percussion. This album was the last to feature keyboardist Michael Snell and vocalist Jon Kennedy, the latter of which was fired from the group, as well as the last to have a heavily symphonic black metal approach. The next album, Kings of Chaos, would feature a more death metal-oriented sound.

== Track listing ==
All lyrics are written by Jon Kennedy; all music is composed by Hecate Enthroned (Kennedy, Nigel Dennen, Andy Milnes, Dylan Hughes, Michael Snell, Bob Kendrick).

No.	Title	Length
1.	"In Nomine Satanas" (instrumental)	2:18
2.	"The Pagan Swords of Legend"	4:53
3.	"Centuries of Wolfen Hunger"	4:10
4.	"Forever in Ebony Drowning"	6:02
5.	"Upon the Kingdom Throne"	4:00
6.	"For Thee, in Sinful Obscurity" (instrumental)	2:11
7.	"Dark Requiems and Unsilent Massacre"	5:40
8.	"Thy Sorrow Bequeathed"	3:27
9.	"The Scarlet Forsaken"	4:34
10.	"Ancient Graveless Dawn"	5:34

== Personnel ==
Hecate Enthroned

- Jon Kennedy – vocals
- Nigel Dennen – guitar
- Andy Milnes – guitar
- Dylan Hughes – bass guitar
- Michael Snell – keyboards
- Rob Kendrick – drums

Miscellaneous staff

- Tim Turan – mastering
- Simon Marsden – photography, cover art
- Pete "Pee-Wee" Coleman – production
