= The Slaughter of Innocence, a Requiem for the Mighty =

Studio album by Hecate Enthroned
- Released: 15 May 1997
- Recorded: 20 January/3 February 1997
- Genre: Symphonic black metal
- Label: Blackend Records
- Producer: Andy Sneap

Hecate Enthroned chronology
Upon Promeathean Shores (Unscriptured Waters) (1995)	The Slaughter of Innocence, a Requiem for the Mighty (1997)	Dark Requiems... and Unsilent Massacre (1998)

The Slaughter of Innocence, a Requiem for the Mighty is the debut full-length album by British band Hecate Enthroned. It was released 15 May 1997, via Blackend Records, and was also their last release to feature Paul Massey on bass and Marc on guitars, and their first to feature long-time drummer Robert Kendrick.

== Track listing ==
All lyrics are written by Jon Kennedy; all music is composed by Hecate Enthroned (Kennedy, Nigel Dennen, Marc, Paul Massey, Michael Snell, Rob Kendrick).

No.	Title	Length
1.	"Goetia" (instrumental)	1:24
2.	"Beneath a December Twilight"	6:50
3.	"The Spell of the Winter Forest"	6:47
4.	"Aflame in the Halls of Blasphemy"	5:41
5.	"A Monument for Eternal Martyrdom" (instrumental)	2:59
6.	"The Slaughter of Innocence, a Requiem for the Mighty"	4:49
7.	"At the Haunted Gallows of Dawn" (instrumental)	3:38
8.	"Christfire"	4:18
9.	"Within the Ruins of Eden"	5:57
10.	"The Danse Macabre"	3:42
11.	"The Beckoning (An Eternity of Darkness)" (instrumental)	1:05

== Personnel ==
Hecate Enthroned

- Jon Kennedy – vocals
- Marc – guitars
- Paul Massey – bass
- Michael Snell – keyboards, orchestral arrangements
- Rob Kendrick – drums, percussion
- Nigel Dennen – guitars, acoustic guitars

Miscellaneous staff

- Tim Turan – mastering
- Simon Marsden – cover art
- Andy Sneap – production
