= Jaroslav Panuška =

Czech painter and illustrator (1872–1958)

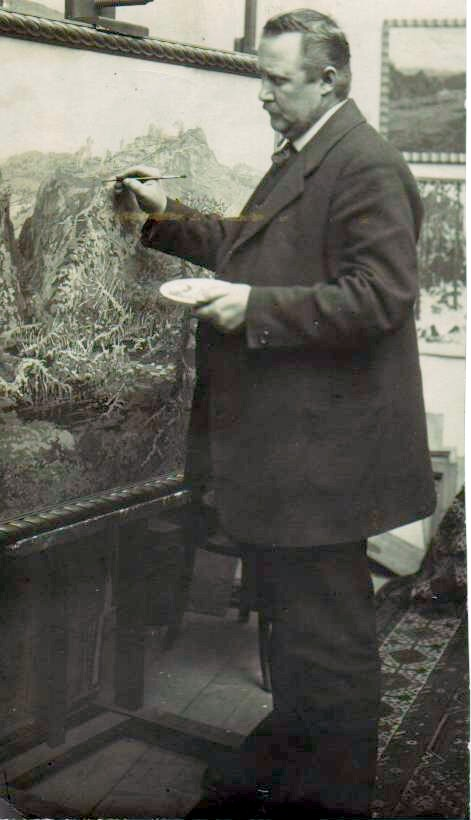
- Panuška in 1916
- Born: 3 March 1872; Hořovice, Bohemia, Austria-Hungary
- Died: 1 August 1958 (aged 86); Kochánov, Czechoslovakia
- Known for: Painting

Jaroslav Panuška (3 March 1872 – 1 August 1958) was a Czech painter and illustrator.

== Biography ==
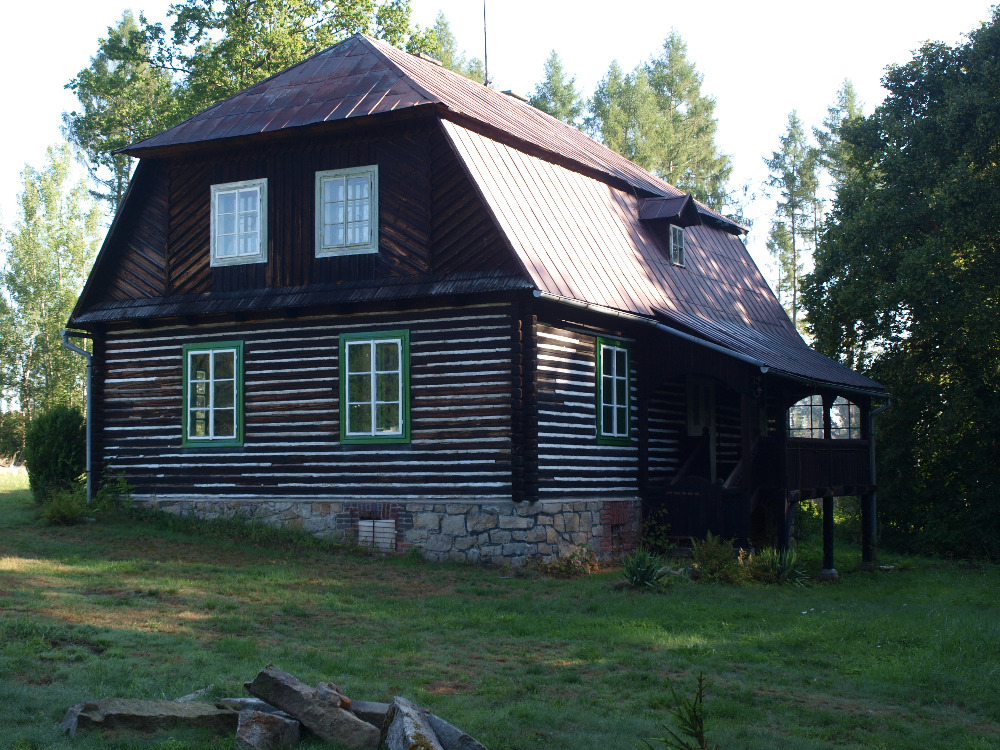
Panuška's house in Kochánov

Born in 1872 in Hořovice, Jaroslav Panuška was the son of a land surveyor. He studied art in Prague under Julius Mařák, becoming one of the leading representatives of his school. During the 1890s he was particularly prominent among Prague artists, and is mostly known for his disturbing treatment of themes related to death, loneliness and the supernatural.

From 1923 until his death in 1958, he lived in Kochánov (part of Světlá nad Sázavou). The so-called Panuška's Oak in Kochánov belonged among frequent subjects of his paintings. Panuška is buried in Světlá nad Sázavou.

== Legacy ==
Panuška's paintings are part of private collections and public museums such as the National Gallery Prague. His works have been included in the annual inter-disciplinary exhibition on 19th-century issues, at the West Bohemian Gallery in Plzeň. In 2014 the theme was On the Edge of the Crowd: Art and the Social Question in the 19th century, and in 2016 Elements Inside Us: Catastrophe and Its Reflection in the 19th Century Culture.

The Czech black metal band Master's Hammer released a song about the artist titled "Panuška", in their 2014 studio album Vagus Vetus.
