= Dana Puchnarová =

Czech artist (1938–2025)

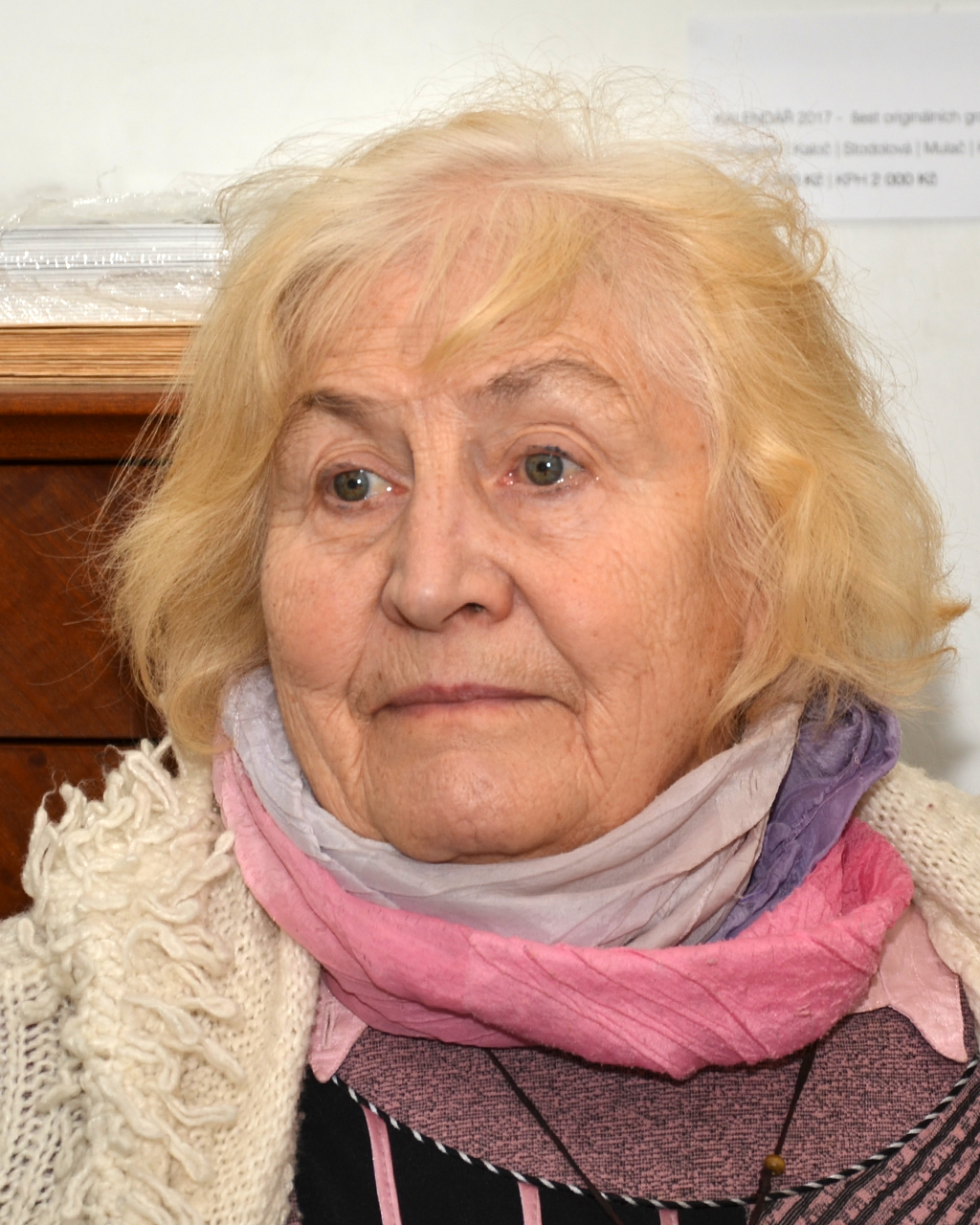
Puchnarová in 2017

Dana Puchnarová (22 January 1938 – 11 June 2025) was a Czech painter, illustrator and graphic artist.

== Early life and education ==
A native of Prague, Puchnarová attended the Secondary School of Fine Arts from 1953 until 1957, and from 1958 until 1964 she was a pupil at the Academy of Fine Arts, Prague. In 1991 she joined the artistic faculty of Palacký University Olomouc, remaining there until 2003.

== Career ==
Puchnarová participated in numerous solo and group exhibitions both at home and abroad. One of her prints is in the collection of the National Gallery of Art.

The asteroid 11105 Puchnarová, discovered by one of her former pupils, is named for Puchnarová. Her son is the artist and musician František Štorm.

== Death ==
Puchnarová died on 11 June 2025, at the age of 87. Her death was confirmed by her son, František Štorm, on his social media profiles.
