= Hecate Enthroned =

Welsh symphonic black metal band

- Also known as: Amethyst, Daemonum
- Origin: Merseyside, England
- Genres: Symphonic black metal, blackened death metal
- Years active: 1993–present
- Labels: Blackend Records, Crank Music Group
- Members: Joe Stamps; Nigel Dennen; Andy Milnes; Dylan Hughes; Pete White; Matt Holmes
- Past members: Jon Kennedy; Dean Seddon; Elliot Beaver; Rob Kendrick; Craig Nichol; Marc Evans; Paul Massey; Michael Snell; Darren Bishop; Dagon; Andy O'Hara; Gareth Hardy

Hecate Enthroned are a symphonic black metal band founded with members from Wales and England, but now based around Cheshire, England. The band formed in 1993 as blackened death metal act Amethyst. They changed their name to Daemonum later on. By 1995, the band adopted Hecate Enthroned and a symphonic black metal style.

The band's name alludes to the Ancient Greek goddess of magic and necromancy, Hecate.

== History ==
=== Early years: 1993–1995 ===
The band that preceded Hecate Enthroned was formed in 1993 in Wrexham, Wales. They were a blackened death metal band named Daemonum (previously Amethyst), whose members were Jon Kennedy, Nigel Dennen, Ian Maiden, Mark Watson-Jones, Steve Slawson, Marc Evans, and Gary. They released a 1993 demo tape, Dreams to Mourn. In 1994, Kennedy left Daemonumto to replace bassist Robin Eaglestone on Cradle of Filth. In 1995, Kennedy left Cradle of Filth and returned to Daemonum, changing the band's name to Hecate Enthroned, developing a melodic black metal style, and replacing Maiden on vocals. Drummer Andy O'Hara, from death metal band Nightmare Visions, replaced Gary. Evans and Dennen remained as guitarists and Watson-Jones remained on bass.

This line-up recorded their first demo tape, An Ode for a Haunted Wood, in 1995.

Hecate Enthroned toured the UK with Japan's Sigh and Ireland's Primordial in 1995. Bassist Dylan Hughes replaced Watson-Jones on live performances. Hecate Enthroned opened for Ved Buens Ende, Impaled Nazarene and Opeth, at London Astoria.

=== Upon Promeathean Shores, The Slaughter of Innocence and Dark Requiems...: 1995–1998 ===
Blackend Records signed Hecate Enthroned, remastered their demo, and released it as the EP Upon Promeathean Shores (Unscriptured Waters) in 1995. It had a more "true" black metal sound, with squashed production, growled vocals, raging tempos, blast beats and symphonic arrangements. Prior to its formal release, Slawson (keyboards), Watson-Jones/Dylan (bass) and O'Hara left the band due to differences with Kennedy, and were replaced with Craig Nichol (drums), Paul Massey (bass) and Michael Snell (keyboards), performing throughout 1996, including a show at The Devil's Church in London.

In 1997, Nichol was replaced with drummer Robert "Rob" Kendrick. That year, Hecate Enthroned released The Slaughter of Innocence, a Requiem for the Mighty, produced by Andy Sneap. The band went in a faster, more aggressive direction, emphasising symphonic interludes. Although well-received, Dani Filth labeled the band a "Cradle of Filth rip-off".

In the end of 1997, Massey and Evans left the band, replaced with Dylan Hughes (who returned to the band after leaving in 1995) and Andy Milnes, respectively. Next year, they released Dark Requiems... and Unsilent Massacre, slowing down and using keyboards as a primary instrument. They created horror-styled atmospheres while retaining the heaviness of prior albums.

=== Change in direction, Kings of Chaos and Miasma: 1998–2001 ===
A couple of months after the release of Dark Requiems..., vocalist Jon Kennedy was fired due to personal and creative differences. Snell also left the band. He was replaced with Darren "Daz" Bishop and Kennedy with Dean "The Serpent" Seddon. The following year, they recorded Kings of Chaos, a death metal-oriented album that retained the keyboards and black metal melodies of previous albums. The band opened for Satyricon.

In 2001, Hecate Enthroned released Miasma, an EP of original songs plus a cover of "Buried Alive" by Venom. That year, Seddon providing vocals for the track "The Serpent" on Akercocke's The Goat of Mendes.

=== Redimus, line-up changes and Virulent Rapture: 2004–2013 ===
In 2004, Seddon temporarily left the band, and was briefly replaced with Dagon. Bishop also left and was replaced with Pete White. Seddon returned to record Redimus, which continued the sound from Kings of Chaos, with death metal guitars, tempos and growls mixed with symphonic black metal keyboards, melodies and screaming. There were also progressive tendencies in the title track and "Morbeea", an acoustic song influenced by Spanish flamenco. Jason Mendonça of Akercocke guested on thr album. Redimus was Hecate Enthroned's last album on Blackend. They signed to Crank Music Group in September 2013.

Hecate Enthroned embark on a UK headline tour playing in London, Southampton, Nottingham, Bradford and Wolverhampton, in 2006. In 2007, they performed in Norway at Inferno Festival alongside Immortal, as well as several shows in Spain, Bulgaria, Romania and Germany. The band was scheduled to play their first show in South America, in Bogotá in December 2012, but it was cancelled due to inner problems. The show in Bogotá was rescheduled for 11 July 2015 and cancelled again.

On 10 December 2012, the band fired Seddon and Kendrick. The latter was replaced with Gareth Hardy. Seddon's replacement, Elliot Beaver, was announced on 14 April 2013.

In a 21 January 2013 interview with webzine RoarRock, the band announced that they were working on Virulent Rapture. Crank Music Group released it on 25 November 2013. Sarah Jezebel Deva of Angtoria and Cradle of Filth guested vocals on a track. An European tour to promote the album followed.

In February 2013, guitarist Nigel Dennen and bassist Dylan Hughes were interviewed for the Hungarian documentary Attention! Black Metal!.

=== Elliot Beaver's departure and Embrace of the Godless Aeon: 2014–2025 ===
They announced on their official Facebook on 7 July 2015 that Beaver left the band. He was replaced with Joe Stamps in late July.

Since 2014, the band were preparing Embrace of the Godless Aeona. M-Theory Audio released it on 25 January 2019. It was Stamps' first work with the group.

In 2020, the band announced that Hardy would leave the band. On 5 July, the band announced drummer Matt Holmes.

On 20 October 2020, former guitarist and founding member Marc Evans committed suicide by hanging. On 25 September 2023, former vocalist Jon Kennedy died, aged 46, following a car accident. Hecate Enthroned and Cradle of Filth paid their condolences.

=== The Corpse of a Titan, a Lament Long Buried: 2026–present ===
On 5 February 2026, the band revealed their seventh album, The Corpse of a Titan, a Lament Long Buried, would be released on 29 May. They released lead single "Gallery of Rotting Portraits".

== Band members ==
=== Current ===
- Nigel Dennen – guitar (1993–present)
- Dylan Hughes – bass guitar (1995, 1997–present)
- Andy Milnes – guitar (1997–present)
- Pete White – keyboards (2004–present)
- Matt Holmes – drums (2020–present)
- Joe Stamps – vocals (2015–present)

=== Former ===
- Jon Kennedy – vocals (1993–1994, 1995–1998), bass (1993–1994; died 2023)
- Dean "The Serpent" Seddon – vocals (1998–2004, 2004–2012)
- Elliot Beaver – vocals (2013–2015)
- Marc Evans – guitar (1993–1997; died 2020)
- Paul Massey – bass (1995–1997)
- Michael Snell – keyboards (1995–1999)
- Craig Nichol – drums (1995–1996)
- Darren "Daz" Bishop – keyboards (1999–2004)
- Steve Slawson – keyboards (1993–1995)
- Dagon – vocals (2004)
- Robert "Rob" Kendrick – drums (1997–2012)
- Ian Maiden – vocals (1994–1995)
- Mark Watson-Jones – bass (1994–1995)
- Andy O'Hara – drums (1994–1995)
- Gareth Hardy – drums (2012–2020)

== Discography ==
=== Demo tapes ===
- Dreams to Mourn (1993 – as Daemonum)
- An Ode for a Haunted Wood (1995)

=== Extended plays ===
- Upon Promeathean Shores (Unscriptured Waters) (1995)
- Miasma (2001)

=== Studio albums ===
- The Slaughter of Innocence, a Requiem for the Mighty (1997)
- Dark Requiems... and Unsilent Massacre (1998)
- Kings of Chaos (1999)
- Redimus (2004)
- Virulent Rapture (2013)
- Embrace of the Godless Aeon (2019)
- The Corpse of a Titan, a Lament Long Buried (2026)
