= Jilemnický okultista =

Studio album by Master's Hammer
- Released: December 1992
- Recorded: 1992
- Genre: Black metal
- Length: 51:00
- Label: Self-released (1992); Osmose Productions (1993); Jihosound Records (2017)
- Producer: Franta Štorm; Vlasta Voral

Master's Hammer chronology
Klavierstück (1991)	Jilemnický okultista (1992)	Šlágry (1995)

Alternative cover
- 2017 Jihosound Records re-issue

Jilemnický okultista (English: "the Jilemnice occultist") is the second studio album by Czech black metal band Master's Hammer, self-released in December 1992 and distributed by Osmose Productions in the following year. Described by the band as "the world's first black metal operetta" and largely inspired by King Diamond's rock operas, it is their first of two concept albums, the second being Vagus Vetus, released in 2014. On several early Osmose pressings, Jilemnice is misspelled as "Filemnice", which was corrected on later pressings. Despite the track listing being in English, all the lyrics are in Czech; the original release contained Czech titles.

On this album, Vlastimil Voral joined Master's Hammer as a full-time member (he had already played on the band's previous album, Ritual., but was credited as a guest musician only).

Jilemnický okultista was re-issued in 2017 by Franta Štorm's label, Jihosound Records, in digipak format, with slightly different cover art and two bonus tracks, taken from a preliminary demo tape version of the album recorded in early February 1992 (see below).

== Storyline ==
The album, which is meant to be read as an "operetta in three acts", is set in Bohemia, in the year 1913, and tells the story of Atrament, a young wandering occultist who arrives in the village of Jilemnice with the intent of furthering his studies of the occult arts there (since at the time, the village was a major venue for occultists and spiritist mediums). He settles at an inn run by the rich landlord Spiritus and falls in love at first sight with his beautiful daughter, Kalamaria, who is secretly a witch. However, the village's hejtman (chieftain), Satrapold, also loves Kalamaria. After unjustly arresting Atrament, he kidnaps Kalamaria with the help of his groom Blether and takes her to his castle. Satrapold plans to escape to Cairo with her (betraying Blether in the process, who flees to the nearby town of Železný Brod in disgrace), but before he can do so, she uses her mystical powers to reveal that he is actually the villainous Poebeldorf under disguise, and that he also imprisoned the real Satrapold. Formerly Satrapold's aide-de-camp, Poebeldorf rebelled against his master and planned to take his place as the village chieftain, steal all its riches and Kalamaria's fortune, and flee to start a new life in a different land. Kalamaria succeeds in thwarting his evil plans thanks to her powers, and subsequently, both Atrament and Satrapold are freed from prison, and Poebeldorf himself is arrested. The album ends with a huge celebration taking place at Spiritus' inn.

The only track unrelated to the album's story is "Suchardův dům (V Nové Pace)". Suchardův dům, or "Sucharda's house" in English, was the residence of the noble Sucharda family of woodcarvers and sculptors from Nová Paka, originally built in 1896. Since 1908, the City Museum of Nová Paka is based at the house. Notable members of the Sucharda family include the brothers Stanislav and Vojtěch Sucharda.

== Covers ==
German gothic metal band the Vision Bleak made an English-language adaptation of "Já mizérií osudu jsem pronásledován..." (under the title "By the Misery of Fate He Was Haunted"), included on the digipak re-release of their 2010 album, Set Sail to Mystery.

== Critical reception ==
Götz Kühnemund, of the German magazine Rock Hard, compared Jilemnický okultista to King Diamond, though Master's Hammer's style was described as "considerably more uncompromising". The vocals were described as "like a mixture of deep King Diamond voices and Quorthon's guttural grunts". Kühnemund lauded the band's unusual style and the album's "[u]nexpectedly good" production that "never lets faster chipping passages degenerate into awful chaos". He called Jilemnický okultista "one of the most extraordinary death metal albums of the year". Gabe Kagan, writing for Invisible Blog, also spoke favorably of the album, calling it "the soundtrack to the literary works of E. T. A. Hoffmann".

In 2017, the album was included on Loudwire's Top 30 Black Metal Albums of All Time, in 27th place.

== Track listing ==
All lyrics are written by Franta Štorm; all music is composed by Master's Hammer (Štorm, Necrocock, Monster, Mirek Valenta, Silenthell, and Vlasta Voral)

No.	Title	English title (as per the 1993 Osmose release)	Length
1.	"Ouverture" (instrumental)	Overture	1:42
2.	"Mezi kopci cesta je klikatá..."	Among the Hills a Winding Way...	5:12
3.	"Já nechci mnoho trápiti..."	I Don't Want, Sirs, to Pester...	6:05
4.	"Kol prostírá se temný les..."	A Dark Forest Spreads All Around...	5:12
5.	"Ten dvanácterák zmizel v houští..."	That Magnificent Deer Has Vanished...	3:32
6.	"Můj hejtmane..."	My Captain...	5:30
7.	"Já mizérií osudu jsem pronásledován..."	By the Misery of Fate I'm Haunted...	4:47
8.	"Ach, pane vzácný..."	Oh, My Precious Sir...	3:54
9.	"Že vše jen podle mého přání..."	Everything That Just on My Whim...	4:26
10.	"Sláva, sláva, pane hejtmane..."	Glory, Herr Hauptmann...	4:47
11.	"Suchardův dům (V Nové Pace)"	Sucharda's Home	5:53

2017 digipak re-issue bonus tracks
No.	Title	English title	Length
12.	"Litografické kalendáře" (instrumental)	Lithographic Calendars	1:38
13.	"Mediální kresby" (instrumental)	Mediunic Drawings	3:58

=== Jilemnický okultista demo ===
The Jilemnický okultista demo tape, self-released in February 1992, contains a slightly different track listing and was recorded on an Apple Macintosh IIci, a novelty in the Czech Republic at the time. The demo counterparts of "Mezi kopci cesta je klikatá..." and "Já nechci mnoho trápiti..." previously appeared on the band's teaser EP Klavierstück, which came out a year prior, under the English titles "Cards Do Not Lie" and "Satrapold", respectively.

Czech guitarist Vítek "Vít" Malinovský was a guest musician on the tape, contributing guitar solos to the instrumental tracks "Litografické kalendáře" and "Mediální kresby".

Front cover of the Jilemnický okultista demo tape

Jilemnický okultista was eventually remastered in 2013 for the release of Demos., a compilation of all of Master's Hammer's demo tapes.

No.	Title	Length
1.	"Předehra" (Prelude – instrumental)	1:22
2.	"Mezi kopci cesta je klikatá..."	5:21
3.	"Já nechci mnoho trápiti..."	5:30
4.	"Ten dvanácterák zmizel v houští..."	3:55
5.	"Můj hejtmane..."	6:20
6.	"Litografické kalendáře" (instrumental)	1:38
7.	"Já mizérií osudu jsem pronásledován..."	4:55
8.	"Že vše jen podle mého přání..."	4:32
9.	"Mediální kresby" (instrumental)	3:58

== Personnel ==
- František "Franta" Štorm – vocals, guitars, photography, cover art, production
- Tomáš "Necrocock" Kohout – guitars
- Tomáš "Monster" Vendl – bass
- Miroslav "Mirek" Valenta – drums
- Honza "Silenthell" Přibyl – timpani
- Vlastimil "Vlasta" Voral – keyboards, production, engineering, mixing
