= Šlágry =

Studio album by Master's Hammer
- Released: 1995
- Genre: Experimental music, electronica, schlager music, musique concrète, black metal, avant-garde metal
- Length: 40:04
- Label: Kron-H
- Producer: Franta Štorm, Vlasta Voral

Master's Hammer chronology
Jilemnický okultista (1992)	Šlágry (1995)	Mantras (2009)

Šlágry (English title: Schlager) is the third studio album by Czech black metal band Master's Hammer, released in 1995 by a now-defunct subsidiary of Osmose Productions, Kron-H, specialized in more experimental outputs than Osmose itself. Greatly contrasting with the sonority of the band's previous releases, Šlágry sees them "virtually abandon[ing] the operatic black metal of previous releases in favor of modernist electronic music", and "shar[ing] publishing credits with Carl Czerny, Otto Katz and Giuseppe Verdi, mixing bits of metal, folk and musique concrète into a style based on the classical avant-garde", as they put it in the album's liner notes. In fact, "Hlava modernistova" is the only black metal-oriented track of the entire album.

Other Master's Hammer members Necrocock, Monster, Mirek Valenta and Silenthell are noticeably absent from the album; only vocalist Franta Štorm and keyboardist Vlasta Voral took part in its recording.

On the album's liner notes the band also stated that they planned a follow-up to Šlágry, entitled Šlágry II, that would "rely more on professional opera singers and orchestra players"; however, the band broke up a couple of months after the album came out, and only returned to active in 2009 with the release of Mantras. It is currently unknown if the band still plans to work on Šlágry II.

== Lyrical and musical inspirations ==
The only tracks of the album written by the band itself are "Indiánská píseň hrůzy" (whose lyrics were inspired by a Czech folksong, according to Franta Štorm on the album's liner notes) and "Hlava modernistova"; all the remaining are covers of old-fashioned pieces.

"Šavlový tanec"

A cover of Aram Khachaturian's famous suite "Sabre Dance", originally present in his ballet Gayane.

"Ach, synku, synku" and "Půjdem spolu do Betléma"

Covers of Czech folk songs.

"Carl Czerny, Op. 849"

As the title says, a short cover of Carl Czerny's Op. 849.

"Rock and Roll Music"

A cover of Chuck Berry's "Rock and Roll Music". Master's Hammer took Berry's vocals from the original version and greatly slowed their pitch, superimposing them over a new instrumental made by them.

"Vzpomínám na zlaté časy"

A poem of authorship unknown, popularized by Jaroslav Hašek's unfinished novel The Good Soldier Švejk.

"Nabucco"

An instrumental iteration of the "Va, pensiero, sull'ali dorate" chorus from Giuseppe Verdi's 1841 opera Nabucco.

== Track listing ==
No.	Title	Lyrics	Music	English title	Length
1.	"Šavlový tanec"	Instrumental	Aram Khachaturian	Sabre Dance	3:29
2.	"Ach, synku, synku"	Traditional	Arr. by Franta Štorm, Vlasta Voral	Ah, Son, Son	7:55
3.	"Půjdem spolu do Betléma"	Traditional	Arr. by Franta Štorm, Vlasta Voral	Let's Go to Bethlehem	3:41
4.	"Indiánská píseň hrůzy"	Franta Štorm	Franta Štorm, Vlasta Voral	Indian Song of Horrors	5:17
5.	"Carl Czerny, Op. 849"	Instrumental	Carl Czerny		0:25
6.	"Rock and Roll Music" (Chuck Berry cover)	Chuck Berry	Chuck Berry		5:09
7.	"Vzpomínám na zlaté časy"	Anonymous	Arr. by Franta Štorm, Vlasta Voral	I Remember the Good Old Days	3:36
8.	"Nabucco"	Instrumental	Giuseppe Verdi		4:14
9.	"Hlava modernistova"	Franta Štorm	Franta Štorm, Vlasta Voral	Modernist Head	6:20

=== Covers ===
Ukrainian black metal band Drudkh covered "Indiánská píseň hrůzy" on their 2010 EP Slavonic Chronicles.

== Personnel ==
- František "Franta" Štorm – vocals, guitars, drums, production
- Vlastimil "Vlasta" Voral – keyboards

== Reception ==
Ian Christe wrote that "Master's Hammer […] have become witty musique moderne composers with Šlágry, trading in distortion for traditional orchestral instrumentation while keeping oddball arrangements that make metal appealing". According to him, "the mixed-up metal influences were part of an exit strategy". Writing for Toilet ov Hell, Ben Serna-Grey stated that "Šlágry is like a nightmare vision of what someone would imagine when they hear about people who are into both classical and metal music, yet seem to fundamentally misunderstand exactly what metal sounds like", comparing the album's sonority favorably to the works of John Cage and Harry Partch.
