= Kings of Chaos (album) =

Studio album by Hecate Enthroned
- Released: 1999
- Genre: Melodic death metal, blackened death metal
- Length: 33:05
- Label: Blackend Records
- Producer: Pete Coleman

Hecate Enthroned chronology
Dark Requiems... and Unsilent Massacre (1998)	Kings of Chaos (1999)	Miasma (2001)

Professional ratings
Review scores
Source	Rating
AllMusic	3/5 stars

Kings of Chaos is the third studio album by British symphonic black metal band Hecate Enthroned. It was released in 1999 via Blackend Records, and it was the band's first album to feature Dean Seddon as vocalist (who replaced the former one, Jon Kennedy, who was fired in the same year) and keyboardist Darren "Daz" Bishop (who replaced Michael Snell).

With this album, Hecate Enthroned greatly toned down their previous symphonic black metal sonority and aesthetics, dropped the corpse paint used on the previous few albums and adopted a style more reminiscent of melodic blackened death metal, albeit still retaining the keyboards and dark black metal melodies of the older albums.

The track "I Am Born" is the first part of the "I Am Born" trilogy; the second part can be heard on 2001's Miasma, and the third one on 2004's Redimus.

== Track listing ==
All tracks are written by Hecate Enthroned.

No.	Title	Length
1.	"Miasma" (instrumental)	0:28
2.	"Perjurer"	3:29
3.	"Deceiving the Deceiver"	3:06
4.	"Malignant Entity" (instrumental)	1:06
5.	"Blessing in Disguise"	3:45
6.	"I Am Born"	3:46
7.	"Exalted in Depravity" (instrumental)	2:09
8.	"Conquest Complete"	4:11
9.	"The Downfall"	3:49
10.	"Repent"	5:36
11.	"Witch-Queen Ascending" (instrumental)	1:44

== Personnel ==
Hecate Enthroned

- Dean Seddon — vocals
- Andy Milnes — guitar
- Nigel Dennen — guitar
- Rob Kendrick — drums, percussion
- Dylan Hughes — bass guitar
- Darren Bishop — keyboards

Additional personnel

- Pete "Pee-Wee" Coleman — production
- Andrea Wright — engineering
