= Banshee (musician) =

American heavy metal musician

- Born: Rachel Dorothea Knight
- Origin: Los Angeles, California
- Genres: Trap metal; hyperpop
- Occupations: Singer, rapper, songwriter, producer, multi-instrumentalist
- Instruments: Vocals, guitar
- Years active: 2018–present
- Label: VERSION III

Rachel Dorothea Knight, professionally known as Banshee, is an American singer and rapper. Active since 2018, she refers to her musical style as "fairy metal" with lyrics that aggressively confront misogyny, abuse, and predatory behavior based on her experiences in the metal scene. Since building a following on TikTok in 2020, Knight has released six studio albums: Fuck With a Banshee (2021), Fairy Metal (2022), Birth of Venus (2023), Sirencore (2024), Fables (2025) and The Secrets to Altering Reality (2026). Her music has received attention from Revolver, Loudwire, and Metal Hammer, and she has collaborated with artists including rapper Backxwash.

== Early life ==
Knight was raised in Conservative Judaism. She and her two younger brothers both received b’nei mitzvahs and attended a Jewish day school, and Knight attended a Jewish summer camp for four years.

Knight was drawn to music from a young age, inspired by Avril Lavigne and Green Day. She began playing guitar at age 8 and performed in various local bands, but sought to be a producer as she didn't believe she could make a living as a smaller musician. Initially a fan of emo music, Knight discovered heavy metal after seeing Lamb of God in eighth grade, and learned to scream starting at age 15 using the videos of noted metal vocal teacher Melissa Cross. She subsequently worked as a local metal producer.

== Career ==
Knight experienced abuse and sexual assault in her local metal scene, driving her away from the genre for a time as it had become. She later told Loudwire "Metal became so closely associated with abuse for me that it became a trigger. I couldn't listen to it without getting flashbacks and panic attacks." During her absence, Knight moved to Los Angeles, where she became interested in electronic music and sound design and spent a few years exploring her sound through self-production. She initially sought to be a hip hop producer but "got too emotionally attached to my beats" and thus began adding her own vocals to them. She began releasing music as Banshee in 2018, having long been fascinated with the banshees of Irish mythology and how they served as "a warning to others". She has since nicknamed her fanbase "Stanshees".

Around the start of the COVID-19 pandemic in 2020, Knight left a previous job that she felt had not taken sufficient safety precautions and began finding traction for her Banshee music on TikTok and Spotify, gaining over 300,000 followers on the former platform by August 2022. She subsequently released two EPs, May He Rot (2020) and Banshee Hollow (2021), and her debut album, Fuck With a Banshee (2021).

In January 2022, Banshee released the single "Chamber". Later that month, she was included on Revolver's monthly "5 Artists You Need to Know" list. A second studio album, Fairy Metal, was released on June 17, including a guest appearance by Canadian rapper Backxwash. Knight characterized the album in interviews as her official return to metal following her traumatic departure. Fairy Metal received critical praise, and songs were featured on playlists like Spotify's New Music Friday and Apple Music's Breaking Metal. In August, Metal Hammer included her on a list of "5 new bands you need to hear this month", calling her sound "a visceral yet ethereal experience" and "a cutting-edge blend of the demonic and angelic". A third EP, Fairy Phonk, was released in November.

In early 2023, Knight held her first headlining show, titled "Cult of Banshee", in Los Angeles, through which she reportedly raised nearly $2,000 for the Rape, Abuse & Incest National Network (RAINN). In May, she premiered the single "Men Are Trash (Wah Wah)" via New Noise Magazine. The song was included on her third studio album, Birth of Venus, released in July 2023. Earmilk praised the album, writing that Knight "continues to win our hearts with boldness and vulnerability in equal parts".

== Artistry ==
As Banshee, Knight performs a signature style self-dubbed "fairy metal", which blends elements of trap metal, hyperpop, symphonic black metal, and witch house, and has drawn comparisons to Ghostemane, Alice Glass, Rico Nasty, Mimi Barks, Backxwash, and Poppy. Her vocals typically alternate between slurred, sometimes Auto-Tuned clean singing and screamed vocals, while Revolver wrote that her instrumentals "fuse the deafening 808s of trap, the bracing synths of witch house and the playful experimentation of digicore". The project initially focused on dark trap-pop, but Knight returned to a black metal influence beginning with the 2022 single "Chamber". Musically, Knight has compared her shifting sound and influences to "phases of the moon" and said "I think it's harder than ever to define genres."

A singer, producer, and multi-instrumentalist, Knight records and produces her music entirely by herself, working from a laptop in her bedroom. Initially a fan of emo artists like Chiodos, Alesana, and "any bands they were promoting at Hot Topic", she was drawn to metal after seeing Lamb of God, and has cited female metal vocalists like Epica's Simone Simons, Nightwish's Tarja Turunen, and Arch Enemy's Angela Gossow as early inspirations, crediting the latter with inspiring her to scream. During her time away from metal, she became inspired by hip hop and electronic music, particularly older house music and contemporary EDM. She has pointed to Memphis rap, in particular early Three 6 Mafia, as an influence on her production, as well as witch house artists like △SCO△ and Sidewalks and Skeletons; rappers Saweetie, Ashnikko, and Megan Thee Stallion who "inspired my confidence and my delivery"; and metal artists Death, Devin Townsend, and Septicflesh. She has also named Children of Bodom and their use of synthesizer on the song "Downfall" as a major influence. Knight has also credited the Jewish music she was raised on for the use of minor and harmonic minor scales in her melodies, and the lyrics of "Fairy Metal" include the Jewish curse "erased shall be his name and memory".

Knight's lyrics bluntly address themes of abuse, sexual assault, misogyny, and predatory behavior, inspired by her own experiences in the metal scene. Revolver wrote that it was "her painful, gripping lyricism that truly sets her apart in a crowded field", while Earmilk described Birth of Venus as "empowering EDM anthems that aim to be a voice for women’s safety at clubs and shows". Of her musical mission, Knight has said, "I've seen so many ways in which society and institutions reward abusers for their behavior. I will scream about it until I die. I want survivors to feel safe existing and never have to live in silence."

== Personal life ==
Knight was previously in an abusive relationship while part of her local metal scene, contributing to her hiatus from the genre. Since 2014, she has dated an anonymous boyfriend, whom she refers to as "Manshee" on social media.

Knight is queer. In October 2020, she came out as biromantic and asexual via Twitter, saying she had struggled to come out as asexual due to believing she was simply "damaged" and affected by trauma.Earmilk referred to her in 2023 as an "LGBTQ+ icon".

Knight says she "never was super tied to the religious part" of her Jewish upbringing but appreciates "the culture and the traditions and the family aspect...anywhere you go in the world, you can meet family." She has noted her uniqueness as a Jewish artist in metal, saying "During my first show, I had a couple of people come up to me and say 'You know, I’m Jewish. It’s so cool that you’re openly Jewish.'" She has also condemned the presence of racism, antisemitism, and Nazism in the metal scene, and has expressed a commitment to making her shows a safe haven for women and queer people within the scene.

== Discography ==
=== Studio albums ===
Year	Title
2021	Fuck with a Banshee
2022	Fairy Metal
2023	Birth of Venus
2024	Sirencore
2025	Fables
2026	The Secrets to Altering Reality

=== EPs ===
Year	Title
2020	May He Rot
2021	Banshee Hollow
2022	Fairy Phonk
2023	Birth of Venus: the remixes

=== Singles ===
Year	Title	Album
2018	"Fuck With a Witch"	non-album single
2018	"Narcissus" (ft. Zxphxr)	non-album single
2019	"Lullaby"	non-album single
2019	"I Live in Silence"	non-album single
2019	"Choke"	non-album single
2019	"Worm"	non-album single
2020	"Lil Good Guy Doll"	non-album single
2020	"I'm the Worst"	non-album single
2020	"Creeps Die Alone"	non-album single
2020	"Don't Fucking Touch Me"	May He Rot
2020	"Scum of the Earth"	non-album single
2020	"If There Was a God You Wouldn't Exist"	non-album single
2020	"I Was Never Yours"	Fuck With a Banshee
2021	"They Will Always Haunt Me"	Fuck With a Banshee
2021	"Fuck With a Witch 2"	Fuck With a Banshee
2021	"Recluse"	non-album single
2021	"Parasite"	Banshee Hollow
2021	"Social Alien (Recluse Pt. 2)"	Banshee Hollow
2022	"Chamber"	Fairy Metal
2022	"Fairy Metal"	Fairy Metal
2022	"Fantasy"	Fairy Metal
2022	"Never Forgive" (ft. Backxwash)	Fairy Metal
2022	"Possess Me"	Fairy Phonk
2022	"can't get u out of my head"	Fairy Phonk
2022	"Kill All Predators" (ft. ZAND)	Fairy Phonk
2022	"Picture This?!" (ft. DEDLINE)	non-album single
2023	"Eternal Trip" (ft. Satin Puppets)	non-album single
2023	"Death of a Predator" (ft. Cinnamon Babe)	Fairy Phonk
2023	"Yes All Men"	Birth of Venus
2023	"Men Are Trash (Wah Wah)"	Birth of Venus
2023	"Get Me Out of This Club"	Birth of Venus
2023	"do i really scare you?"	Birth of Venus
2023	"Birth of Venus"	Birth of Venus
2023	"Take me to the oceanside"	Birth of Venus
2023	"do i really scare you?" (Alice DiMar remix)	non-album single
2023	"Yes All Men" (HVDES remix)	non-album single
2024	"Sirencore"	Sirencore
2024	"The Angel in the Sound"	Sirencore
2024	"High by the Beach" (Lana Del Rey cover)	Sirencore
2025	"Cry me a river"	Fables
2025	"I may be a doe"	Fables
2025	"You are what you fear in me"	Fables
2025	"Backstabber"	Fables
2025	"I trusted you"	Fables
2025	"Vultures"	Fables
2025	"Force of Nature"	The Secrets to Altering Reality
2025	"You're the only one I trust"	The Secrets to Altering Reality
2025	"Lamb who screams"	The Secrets to Altering Reality
2025	"midsummer eve"	The Secrets to Altering Reality
2025	"I used to blame God"	The Secrets to Altering Reality
2025	"Daughter of Eve"	The Secrets to Altering Reality
2026	"Fawnheart"	The Secrets to Altering Reality
2026	"Lady of the slain"	The Secrets to Altering Reality
2026	"Judith"	non-album single

=== Guest appearances ===
Year	Song	Main artist	Album
2016	"Fly 2"	Zomby	Ultra
2020	"Skin"	Sineila	Ghosts
2021	"End the Simulation"	Witto Goom	Funereal
2021	"Psychogothbitchez"	Lil Summoner	Backwoods Hera
2022	"Dead Awake"	Kayzo	New Breed
2022	"The Blood of the Heartless (Detritus)"	My Heart, an Inverted Flame	non-album single
2022	"Static"	Jimmy Edgar	Liquids Heaven
2023	"Loose"	Cinnamon Babe	non-album single

=== Music videos ===
Year	Title	Director
2021	"Parasite"	Jack Rottier
2021	"Banshee Hollow"	Jack Rottier
2022	"Chamber"	Allorie Alexander
2022	"Fairy Metal"	Allorie Alexander
2022	"Kill All Predators" (Note: This music video is no longer available)	Allorie Alexander
2023	"Get Me Out of This Club"	Allorie Alexander
2023	"Birth of Venus"	Isabel Malia
2023	"Sirencore"	Banshee
2024	"The Angel in the Sound"	Banshee
2024	"High by the Beach"	Banshee
2024	"Beach Worms"	Banshee
2025	"Daughter of Eve"	Banshee, Elizabeth Elder and Emily O'Dette
