= Twilight Ophera =

Finnish band

Twilight Ophera is a symphonic black metal band from Finland. The band formed in 1996, and signed with British label Cacophonous the following year. This label folded in 2000, and the group went through lineup changes before signing with Crash Music in the United States in 2003.

== Band members ==
- Mikko Häkkinen - vocals
- Mikko Kaipainen - guitar
- Toni Näykki - guitar
- Lord Heikkinen - bass
- Timo Puranen - keyboards
- Janne Ojala - drums

=== Former members ===
- Timo Kollin - drums
- Sauli "Karkkunen" Lehtisaari (died 2004) - vocals
- Anu Kohonen - vocals
- Jani Viljakainen - bass
- T. Kristian - drums

== Discography ==
- Shadows Embrace the Dark (1997)
- Midnight Horror (1999)
- The End of Halcyon Age (2003)
- Twilight Ophera and the Order of the Sanguine Diadem presents: Descension (2006)
