= Vagus Vetus =

Studio album by Master's Hammer
- Released: 18 May 2014
- Genre: Black metal, avant-garde metal
- Length: 55:47
- Label: Jihosound Records
- Producer: Franta Štorm

Master's Hammer chronology
Vracejte konve na místo. (2012)	Vagus Vetus (2014)	Formulæ (2016)

Vagus Vetus is the sixth studio album by Czech black metal band Master's Hammer, released on 18 May 2014 through the band's own record label, Jihosound Records, founded the year prior. It is the group's second concept album so far, the first one being Jilemnický okultista, released in 1992.

The album tells the surreal adventures of an imaginary old wanderer, whose name is Vagus Vetus, through an "unfamiliar labyrinth" where "there's nothing good waiting for him. Disgusted with progress and modernity of all kinds, he enjoys listening to Aeolian harps and sounds of postmortal flatulence. He finds his consolation in hedonic experiences of natural origin".

The track "Panuška" is a tribute to Czech painter Jaroslav Panuška (1872–1958).

== Track listing ==
All lyrics are written by Franta Štorm; all music is composed by Master's Hammer (Štorm, Necrocock and Silenthell).

No.	Title	English title	Length
1.	"αιολος I." (instrumental)	Aeolus I.	0:57
2.	"XMZ (Note: Acronym for "Xenofobní Misanthropickou Zrůdu"; in English, "Xenophobic Misanthropic Monster".)"		4:09
3.	"Panuška"		5:19
4.	"V aiolských harfách"	In Aeolian Harps	5:52
5.	"Chrchel"	Sputum	4:44
6.	"Receptura"	Recipe	4:31
7.	"Špacírka"	Walking Cane	3:30
8.	"Na kanibalských jatkách"	At the Cannibal Slaughterhouse	3:47
9.	"Beedi"		4:26
10.	"Zvířecí zvuky"	Animal Noises	4:30
11.	"Prďák"	Fart	4:23
12.	"Pod vrstvou prachu"	Under a Layer of Dust	4:23
13.	"Nengemengelengem"		3:27
14.	"αιολος II." (instrumental)	Aeolus II.	1:44

== Personnel ==
- František "Franta" Štorm – vocals, guitar, bass, drums, samples, production, cover art
- Tomáš "Necrocock" Kohout – guitar
- Honza "Silenthell" Přibyl – timpani
