= Rape of the Bastard Nazarene =

Studio album by Akercocke
- Released: 28 December 1999
- Genre: Blackened death metal
- Length: 39:20
- Label: Goat of Mendes
- Producers: Martin Bonsoir, Akercocke

Akercocke chronology
Rape of the Bastard Nazarene (1999)	The Goat of Mendes (album) (2001)

Professional ratings
Review scores
Source	Rating
AllMusic	3/5 stars
Chronicles of Chaos	9/10
Kerrang!	favourable
Terrorizer	favourable

Rape of the Bastard Nazarene is the first studio album by English death metal band Akercocke. It was released on 28 December 1999, through the band's own record label Goat of Mendes.

== Musical style ==
AllMusic described the album's style as "an interesting mix of two musical styles that don't often go together. About half of Rape of the Bastard Nazarene [...] consists of utterly standard-issue death metal, complete with whiplash tempos, hyperspeed blast drumming and the often comical 'death growl' vocals. The other half of the album is doomy, synth-heavy post-punk, seemingly influenced by the likes of Killing Joke and (especially on the unexpectedly melodic, catchy "Marguerite & Gretchen") Pornography-era Cure."

== Track listing ==
No.	Title	Length
1.	"Declaration"	0:09
2.	"Hell"	4:20
3.	"Nadja"	2:57
4.	"The Goat"	2:30
5.	"Marguerite & Gretchen"	6:59
6.	"Sephiroth Rising" (instrumental)	1:11
7.	"Zuleika"	4:12
8.	"Conjuration"	1:57
9.	"Il Giardino di Monte Oliveto Maggiore"	4:01
10.	"Justine"	5:12
66.	"The Blood of Khaos"	2:12

Bonus tracks
No.	Title	Length
11.	"Sempiternal Suffering"	10:31
12.	"Nirvana of Agony"	7:53
13.	"Luciferian Canto"	2:12

Tracks 11–13 are songs by Salem Orchid, and can be found on the re-issue. Originally released on audio demo tape in 1991, Mendonça and Gray composed and recorded these songs with guitarist Stephen Wood.

== Personnel ==
Akercocke

- Jason Mendonça – guitars, vocals
- David Gray – drums
- Peter Theobalds – bass (track 1–10)
- Paul Scanlan – guitars (track 1–10)
- Martin Bonsoir – keyboards, recording, engineering, production (track 1–10)

Additional personnel

- Stephen Wood – guitars (track 11–13)
- Dan Temple – bass (track 11–13)
- Salem Orchid – production (track 11–13)
- Nicola Kemp, Tanya Warwick – additional vocals
- Peter Theobalds – design
- Stevvi – photography
