= Upon Promeathean Shores (Unscriptured Waters) =

EP by Hecate Enthroned
- Released: 7 July 1995
- Recorded: Academy Studios, Dewsbury, Yorkshire, England, 1995
- Genre: Symphonic black metal
- Length: 30:19
- Label: Blackend Records
- Producer: Robert Magoolagan, Hecate Enthroned

Hecate Enthroned chronology
An Ode for a Haunted Wood (1995)	Upon Promeathean Shores (Unscriptured Waters) (1995)	The Slaughter of Innocence, a Requiem for the Mighty (1997)

Upon Promeathean Shores (Unscriptured Waters) is an EP and the first studio release by the British symphonic black metal band Hecate Enthroned. It was released by Blackend Records on 7 July, 1995. This is essentially their An Ode for a Haunted Wood demo reworked and released as the first album under their record label.

Stylistically this found the band in a more "true" black metal sound, with squashed production, growled vocals, raging tempos, blast beats and symphonic arrangements. Accusations of the band being a "Cradle of Filth rip-off" began to manifest as the band's name got bigger.

The album was remastered and re-released in 1998 by Blackend with two bonus tracks and a different cover art.

A music video was made for the track "An Ode for a Haunted Wood".

A picture of the famous ruins of the Whitby Abbey was used as the cover.

== Track listing ==
All lyrics are written by Jon Kennedy; all music is composed by Hecate Enthroned (Kennedy, Nigel, Marc, Mark Watson-Jones, Steve, Andy O'Hara – 1995).

No.	Title	Length
1.	"Promeathea (Thy Darkest Mask of Surreality)"	2:15
2.	"The Crimson Thorns (My Immortal Dreams)"	4:26
3.	"A Graven Winter"	7:30
4.	"To Feed Upon Thy Dreams"	6:46
5.	"An Ode for a Haunted Wood"	7:13
6.	"Through Spellbinding Branches (Deepest Witchcraft)" (instrumental)	2:08

1998 re-release bonus tracks
No.	Title	Length
7.	"The Danse Macabre" (new version)	5:13
8.	"Luciferian Death Code"	2:22

== Personnel ==
Hecate Enthroned

- Nigel Dennen – guitar
- Jon Kennedy – vocals
- Marc Evans – Guitar
- Craig – drums
- Paul Massey – bass
- Michael Snell – keyboards

Miscellaneous staff

- Robert "Mags" Magoolagan – production, mastering
- Simon Marsden – cover art

Recording lineup – 1995

- Nigel Dennen – guitar
- Jon Kennedy – vocals
- Marc Evans – Guitar
- Andy O'Hara – drums
- Mark Watson-Jones – bass
- Steve – keyboards
