= Světlá nad Sázavou =

- Town
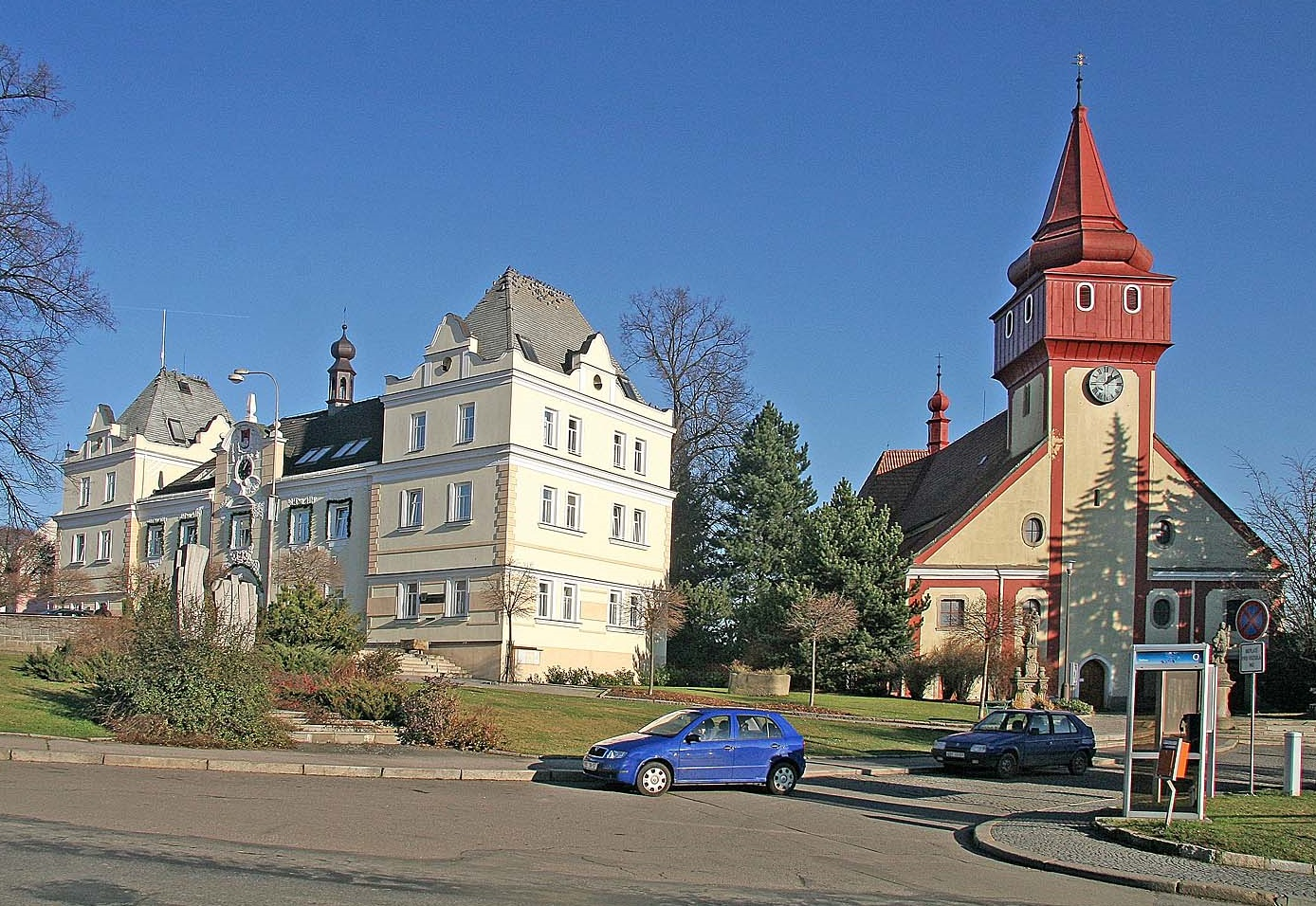
- Town square

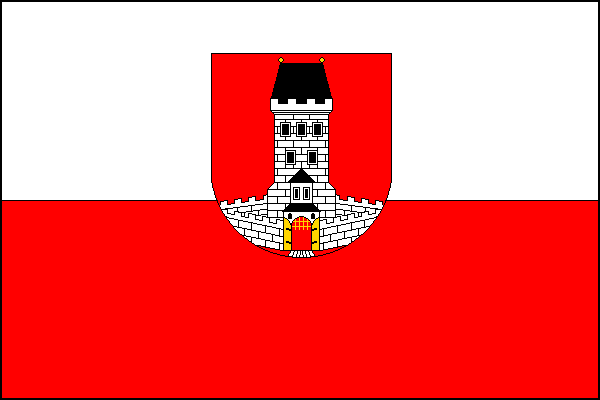
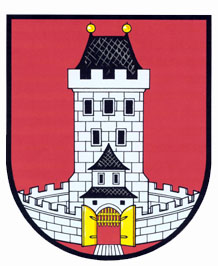
- Flag Coat of arms

- Location in the Czech Republic
- Coordinates: 49°40′5″N 15°24′14″E
- Country: Czech Republic
- Region: Vysočina
- District: Havlíčkův Brod
- First mentioned: 1207

Government
  - Mayor: Martin Bezouška

Area
  - Total: 42.08 km^{2} (16.25 sq mi)
- Elevation: 515 m (1,690 ft)

Population (2026-01-01)
  - Total: 6,289
  - Density: 149.5/km^{2} (387.1/sq mi)
- Time zone: UTC+1 (CET)
  - Summer (DST): UTC+2 (CEST)
- Postal code: 582 91
- Website: www.svetlans.cz

Světlá nad Sázavou (Czech pronunciation: [ˈsvjɛtlaː ˈnat saːzavou]; German: Swietla ob der Sasau) is a town in Havlíčkův Brod District in the Vysočina Region of the Czech Republic. It has about 6,300 inhabitants. The town is located on the Sázava River in the Upper Sázava Hills.

Světlá nad Sázavou is known for a large women's prison. The most important monument in the town is the Světlá nad Sázavou Castle.

== Administrative division ==
Světlá nad Sázavou consists of 15 municipal parts (in brackets population according to the 2021 census):

- Světlá nad Sázavou (6,051)
- Benetice (30)
- Dolní Březinka (197)
- Dolní Dlužiny (14)
- Horní Březinka (77)
- Horní Dlužiny (38)
- Josefodol (125)
- Kochánov (59)
- Leštinka (38)
- Lipnička (106)
- Mrzkovice (159)
- Opatovice (49)
- Radostovice (64)
- Závidkovice (99)
- Žebrákov (31)

== Etymology ==
The name Světlá is derived from the Czech adjective světlá, meaning 'light', 'bright'. The suffix nad Sázavou means 'upon Sázava'.

== Geography ==
Světlá nad Sázavou is located about 14 kilometres (9 mi) northwest of Havlíčkův Brod and 32 km (20 mi) northwest of Jihlava. It lies in the Upper Sázava Hills. The highest point is the hill Žebrákovský kopec at 601 m (1,972 ft) above sea level. The Sázava River flows through the town. The Sázavka Stream flows into the Sázava on the eastern outskirts of the town, and several other smaller streams also flow into the Sázava within the municipal territory. There are several fishponds in the municipal territory.

== History ==
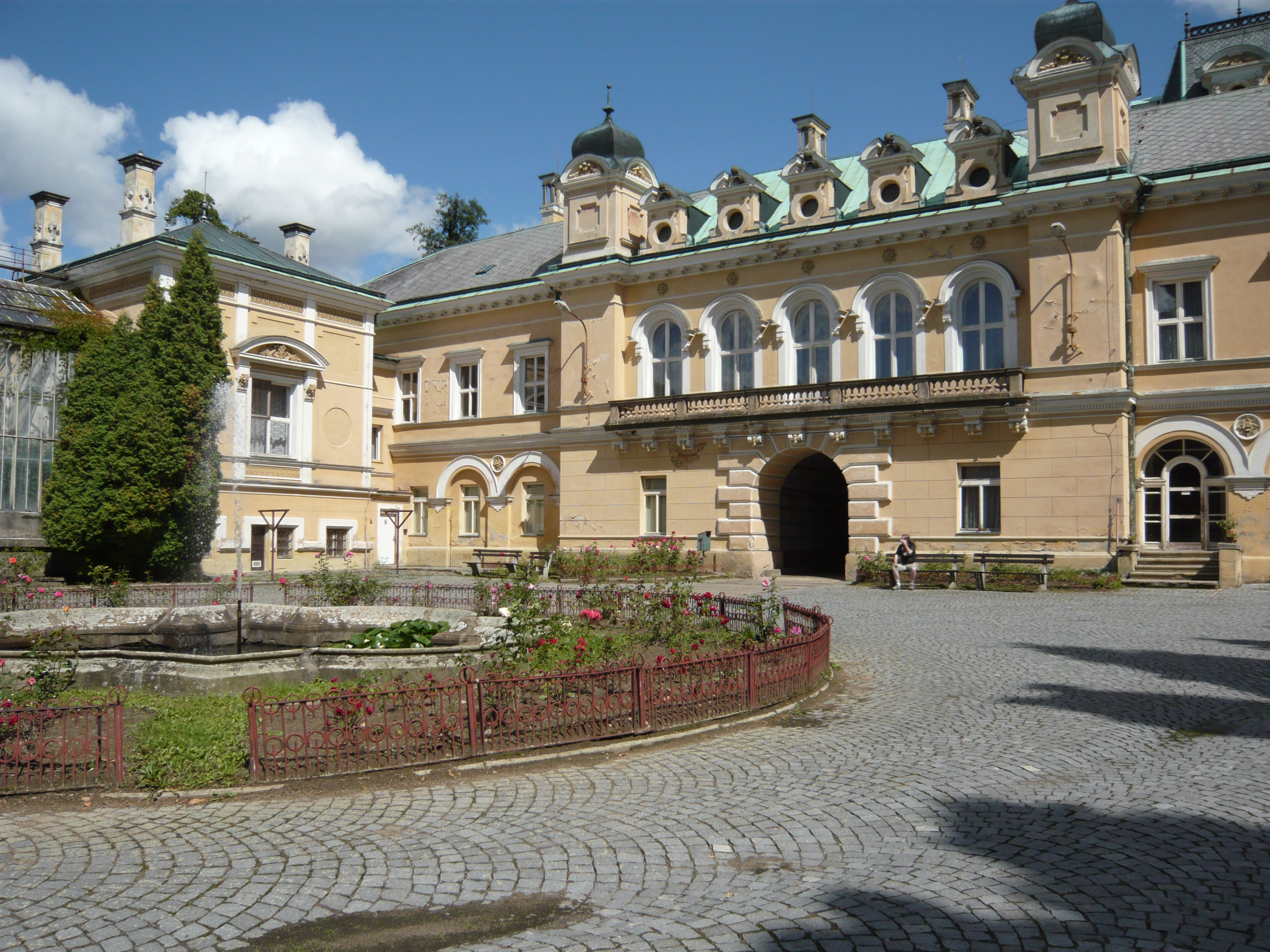
Světlá nad Sázavou Castle

The first written mention of Světlá is from 1207. It was founded during the colonisation in the second half of the 12th century. Světlá experienced the greatest development during the rule of the Trčka of Lípa family, which acquired it after the Hussite Wars and owned it until 1607. In the 17th century, the glassmaking tradition was founded in Světlá.

== Demographics ==
Historical population

Year	Pop.	±%
1869	3,881	—
1880	3,959	+2.0%
1890	3,994	+0.9%
1900	4,330	+8.4%
1910	4,674	+7.9%

Year	Pop.	±%
1921	4,505	−3.6%
1930	4,379	−2.8%
1950	3,758	−14.2%
1961	4,468	+18.9%
1970	4,363	−2.4%

Year	Pop.	±%
1980	6,116	+40.2%
1991	7,147	+16.9%
2001	7,188	+0.6%
2011	7,091	−1.3%
2021	7,137	+0.6%

Source: Censuses

== Economy ==
The glassmaking tradition continues to this day. Crystal Bohemia, the largest Czech glass company, has owned a local production plant since 2020.

The Světlá nad Sázavou Prison is the main employer in Světlá nad Sázavou. It is a large prison for women with all levels of security, employing more than 300 people. In 2022, its capacity was expanded to 955 convicts.

== Transport ==
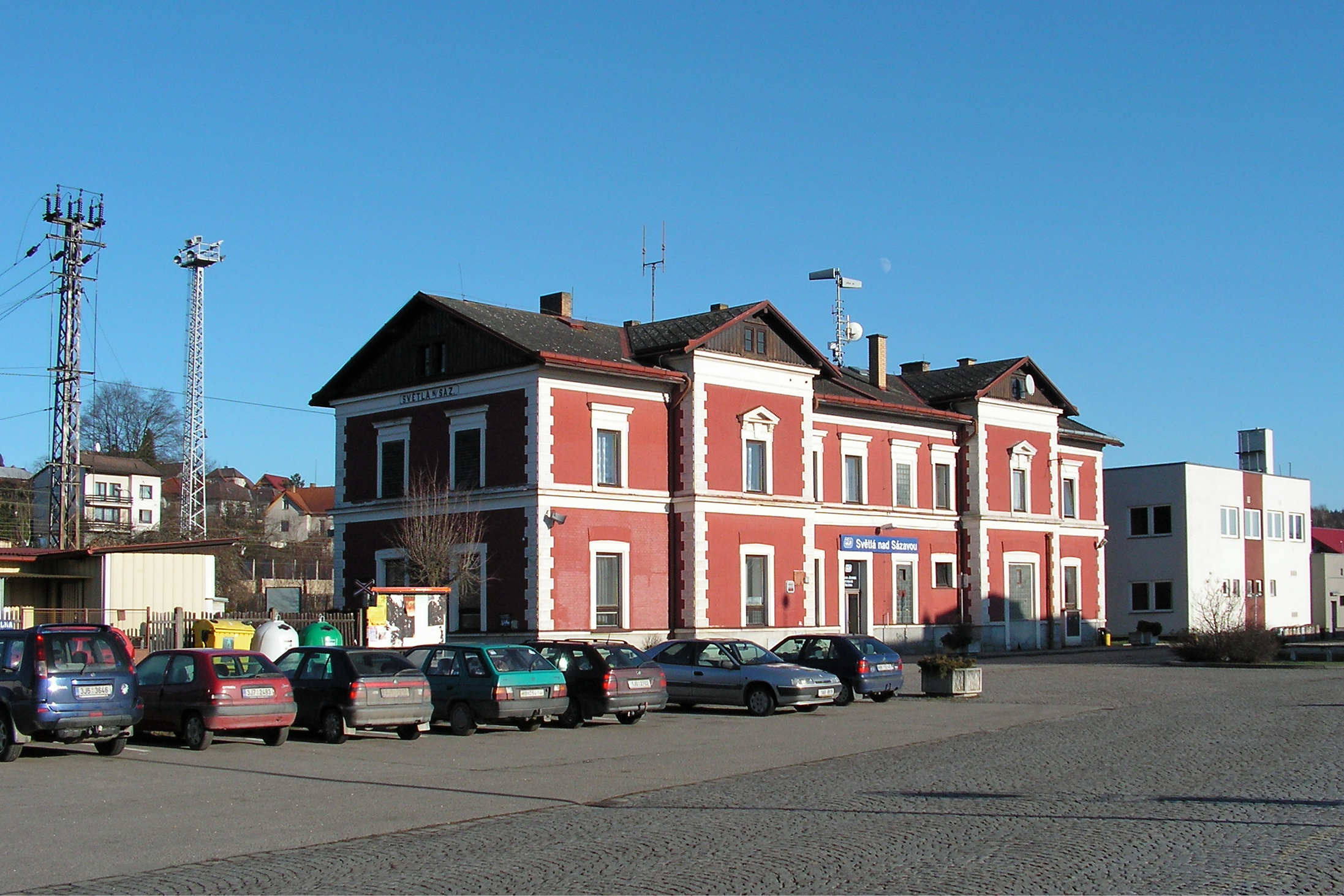
Train station

Světlá nad Sázavou is located on the railway lines Prague–Brno and Havlíčkův Brod–Ledeč nad Sázavou. The train station dates from the 1870s and is protected as a cultural monument.

== Sights ==
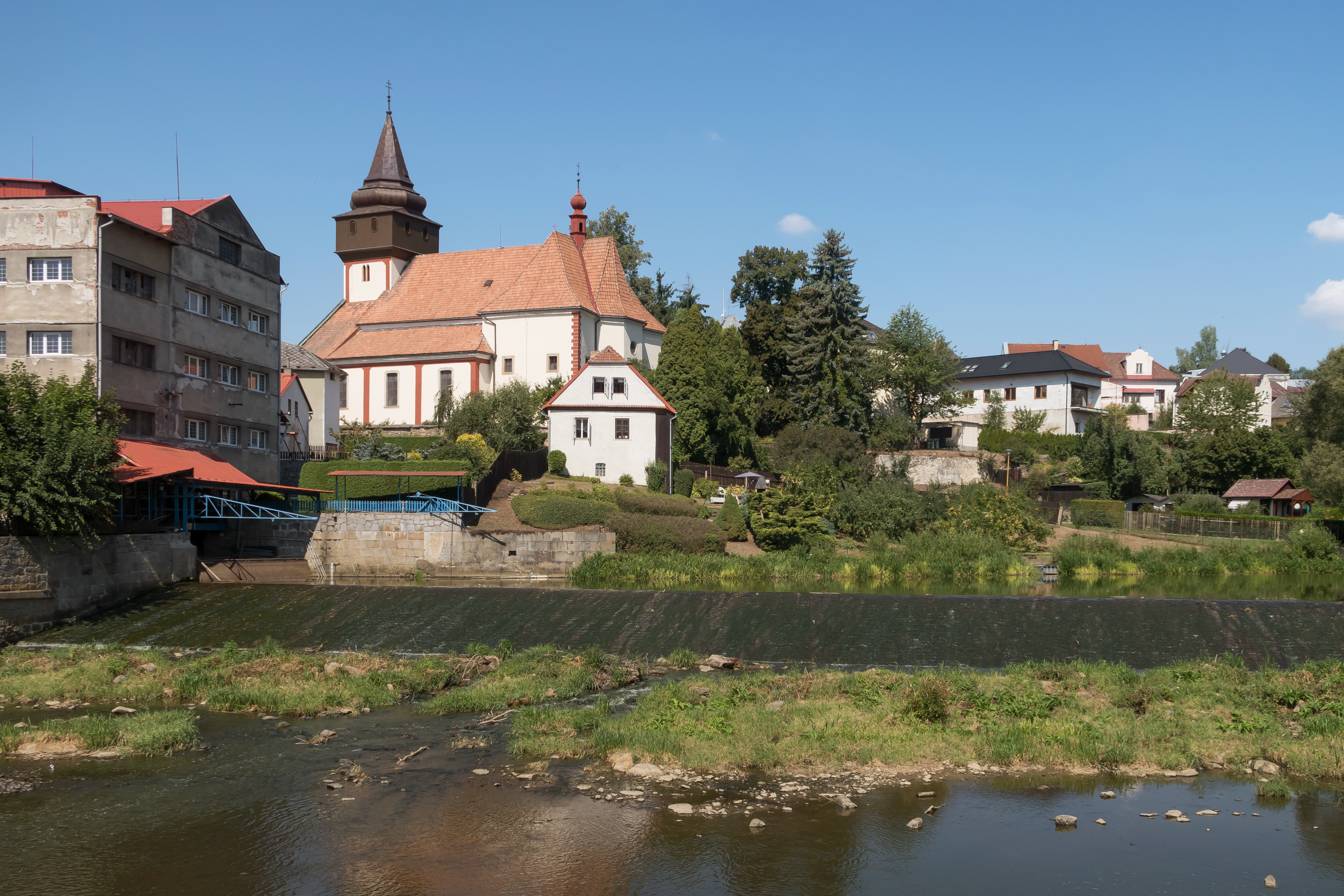
Church of Saint Wenceslaus

The main sight of the town is the Světlá nad Sázavou Castle. It was probably originally a fortress, rebuilt into a castle by Burian Trčka of Lípa in 1567. Today the castle is open to the public and houses several expositions, and a part of the castle is used as a hotel. Next to the castle is an English park with an area of 16 ha (40 acres), founded in 1871.

A significant building is the Church of Saint Wenceslaus. It was originally a Gothic church, rebuilt in the Renaissance and Baroque styles. It has an atypical tower. The second landmark of the town square is the town hall, built at the turn of the 18th and 19th centuries.

== Notable people ==
- Jaroslav Panuška (1872–1958), painter and illustrator; lived here in 1923–1958
- Oskar Morawetz (1917–2007), Canadian composer
- Martina Krupičková (born 1975), painter
