= Lemuria (Belgian band) =

Belgian metal band

- Origin: Antwerp, Belgium
- Genres: Symphonic black metal
- Years active: 1999–present
- Labels: Massacre Records
- Members: Daan Swinnen; Gaël Sortino; Jeroen De Kooning; Fré De Schepper; Vincent Pichal
- Website: www.lemuria.be

Lemuria is a Belgian symphonic black metal band from Antwerp, formed in 1999. Lemuria is the name of a legendary lost continent.

== History ==
The band was conceived in 1999 under the name Spinal Chill and a demo named Demonic was released in the same year. In 2001, the band name was changed to Lemuria. A second demo, The Vault of the Witness, was recorded in The Cavern Studios in Antwerp and released in April 2002.

=== Tales, Ale & Fire (2004) ===
Their first full-length album, Tales, Ale & Fire, was released in 2004. At the time, the sound was compared with Finntroll, Ensiferum, Thyrfing, Bal-Sagoth and Rhapsody. The sound of the album is best described as a blend of folk and black metal. Tales, Ale & Fire was recorded, mixed and mastered in the Midas studio in Lokeren. The album is a concept album based on the Viking invasion of flanders.

=== Chanson de la Croisade (2010) ===
In 2010, a second concept album, Chanson de la Croisade, was released. It has more symphonic elements while still embracing the folk metal roots. The story of the album deals with the prosecution of the Cathars, members of a Christian religious movement that appeared in the Languedoc region of France and other parts of Europe in the 12th century. Chanson de la Croisade was recorded in the Midas studio and the Red Left Hand studio.

In 2012, Lemuria won the Graspop Metal Meeting Talent Quest competition, granting them the title of "Graspop band of the year 2012".

After a short break in 2014, the band was reformed with a new vocalist and guitar player. Since then, the band played at several festivals including Kraken, Mass Death, Elftopia, Devil's Rock and the Hellhammer Festival.

=== The Hysterical Hunt (2019) ===
A third concept album, The Hysterical Hunt, was released in 2019 by Massacre Records. The story line of the album is inspired by the mythical Beast of Gévaudan. Belgian actor Herbert Flack provides guest vocals as narrator.

== Discography ==
- The Vault of the Witness (2002)
- Tales, Ale & Fire (2004)
- Chanson de la Croisade (2010)
- The Hysterical Hunt (2019)
