= Choronzon (album) =

Studio album by Akercocke
- Released: 4 November 2003
- Genre: Blackened death metal, progressive metal
- Length: 54:39
- Label: Earache
- Producer: Akercocke

Akercocke chronology
The Goat of Mendes (2001)	Choronzon (2003)	Words That Go Unspoken, Deeds That Go Undone (2005)

Choronzon is the third studio album by English death metal band Akercocke. It was released on 4 November 2003, through Earache Records.

== Background ==
The sample at the start of the album is from the opening scene of the Hammer House of Horror episode "Guardian of the Abyss".

== Release ==
A promotional music video was released for the track "Leviathan", and was shot by Kerrang!'s Paul Harries.

=== Critical reception ===
Professional ratings
Review scores
Source	Rating
Allmusic	4/5 stars
Chronicles of Chaos	8.5/10
Kerrang!	5/5 stars

The album was praised by Kerrang!, who wrote, "Akercocke have had enough time and financial clout to deliver the album they've been threatening to make all along. And its absolutely fucking magnificent [...] countless moments of innovation that will dazzle and delight anyone lusting for a dash of the truly inspirational [...] You will not hear a more imaginative or daring record this year", and calling it the best album of 2003. Terrorizer called it "the most inventive Akercocke album yet".

== Track listing ==
All lyrics are written by David Gray.

No.	Title	Length
1.	"Praise the Name of Satan"	7:10
2.	"Prince of the North"	2:04
3.	"Leviathan"	7:47
4.	"Enraptured by Evil"	4:06
5.	"Choronzon"	2:07
6.	"Valley of the Crucified"	5:09
7.	"Bathykolpian Avatar"	5:25
8.	"Upon Coriaceous Wings"	1:46
9.	"Scapegoat"	4:13
10.	"Son of the Morning"	5:32
11.	"Becoming the Adversary"	6:49
12.	"Goddess Flesh"	2:31

== Personnel ==
=== Akercocke ===
- Jason Mendonca – guitar, vocals, arrangement, production
- Paul Scanlan – guitar, arrangement, production
- The Ritz – keyboards, arrangement, production
- Peter Theobalds – bass guitar, arrangement, production
- David Gray – drums, percussion, arrangement, production

=== Production ===
- Martin Bonsoir – recording, engineering
- Neil Kernon – mixing
- John Paul – mastering
