= Words That Go Unspoken, Deeds That Go Undone =

Studio album by Akercocke
- Released: October 10, 2005
- Recorded: Chicago
- Genre: Blackened death metal, progressive metal
- Length: 47:59
- Label: Earache
- Producer: Akercocke

Akercocke chronology
Choronzon (2003)	Words That Go Unspoken, Deeds That Go Undone (2005)	Antichrist (2007)

Professional ratings
Review scores
Source	Rating
Chronicles of Chaos	9.5/10
Stylus Magazine	B+

Words That Go Unspoken, Deeds That Go Undone is the fourth studio album by English extreme metal band Akercocke. It was released independently on October 10, 2005, and on February 7, 2006 through Earache Records. This album is the first Akercocke release not to feature the original line-up of the band, with Matt Wilcock (ex-The Berzerker) instead of Paul Scanlan on guitar; though the majority of the material was co-written with Paul Scanlan before he was fired.

== Limited Edition ==
A limited two-disc CD-DVD edition of the album was released, featuring behind-the-scenes footage of the band during the making of the album as well as a brief documentary thereof.

== Track listing ==
All tracks are written by Jason Mendonça, Matt Wilcock, Peter Theobalds and David Gray, except where noted.

No.	Title	Writer(s)	Length
1.	"Verdelet"		4:46
2.	"Seduced"	Mendonça, Theobalds, Gray, Paul Scanlan	4:40
3.	"Shelter from the Sand"	Mendonça, Theobalds, Gray, Scanlan	10:40
4.	"Eyes of the Dawn"		4:41
5.	"Abbadonna, Dying in the Sun"		1:21
6.	"Words That Go Unspoken, Deeds That Go Undone"	Mendonça, Theobalds, Gray, Scanlan	5:13
7.	"Intractable"		3:56
8.	"Seraphs and Silence"	Mendonça, Theobalds, Gray, Scanlan	4:44
9.	"The Penance"		4:32
10.	"Lex Talionis"		3:29
Total length:			47:59

== Personnel ==
Akercocke

- Jason Mendonça – guitars, vocals
- Matt Wilcock – guitars
- Peter Theobalds – bass
- David Gray – drums

Production

- Akercocke – recording, production
- Neil Kernon – mixing
- Alan Douches – mastering

Artwork

- Peter Theobalds – layout, cover
- Sam Scott-Hunter – photography
