= Antichrist (Akercocke album) =

Studio album by Akercocke
- Released: 28 May 2007
- Recorded: Goat of Mendes Studios in London, England
- Genre: Blackened death metal, progressive metal
- Length: 41:28
- Label: Earache
- Producer: Akercocke

Akercocke chronology
Words That Go Unspoken, Deeds That Go Undone (2006)	Antichrist (2007)	Renaissance in Extremis (2017)

Antichrist is the fifth studio album by English death metal band Akercocke, released in 2007. It is their third release on Earache Records and the first to feature Peter Benjamin on bass, having replaced Peter Theobalds. The limited edition super jewel case version (Limited to 8000 copies worldwide) includes two bonus tracks, these are covers of songs by Morbid Angel & Death.

A video has been released for the song "Axiom".

The lyrics "I believe that when I die, I shall rot, and nothing of my ego shall survive" from "Axiom" are taken from the writings of Bertrand Russell.

== Recording ==
The preparations for the recording of Antichrist began in late November 2006. The band started recording at its own Goat of Mendes Studios in December. However, in mid-January 2007, bassist Peter Theobalds has announced his departure from Akercocke. Theobalds explained that "reasons are many and varied but the principal factor has been that the original vibe that drove [him] to play has gone. The fun, the utter immersion of the music and friendship and the camaraderie has been slowly eroding for [him], personally, over the last year or so." The band quickly announced bassist Peter Benjamin as a replacement, and resumed the recordings of Antichrist throughout February.

== Controversy ==
I think the album has caused a bit of a stir amongst certain circles in Northern Ireland, and the BBC got wind of this and have set up a debate between us and some people who I imagine are quite incensed by our mere existence.

—Jason Mendonca, Metal Hammer

Before its release, the album caused uproar amongst Northern Ireland's religious community, and was subject of a major religious debate on BBC Northern Ireland. The debate was presented by Stephen Nolan at his Nolan Live television programme, broadcast live via satellite link at 10:45 p.m. on BBC One Northern Ireland following Akercocke's gig on 16 May at the Rock City club in Nottingham. According to Brave Words & Bloody Knuckles magazine, the controversy started after Akercocke made available the song "Summon the Antichrist" on 26 April in a MySpace page dedicated for fans find out more information about the album, as well as to participate in "The Antichrist Code" contest. A producer from BBC Northern Ireland called Mendonca and asked if he would be interested in taking part in a debate. She said some people had taken exception to the album, its lyrics and the band's imagery, and asked would he be interested to discuss this on television with members of the clergy. Mendonca accepted thinking, "it was a serious debate, with a serious presenter of note conducting a proper interview," which was assured by the producer.

In mid-May 2007 Metal Hammer magazine spoken to Mendonca about the furore surrounding Antichrist. Mendonca talked about the censorship in the United States, where the album run into more controversy when the pressing plant handling its production, Disc USA, refused to print the CD booklet due its "Satanic" and "anti-Christian" perspective. Mendonca stated that the fact sounded like fascism to him and questioned the US censorship, saying: "I rather perturbed that in this day and age, the 21st century, people are so uptight. Whatever happened to freedom of speech and freedom of expression in the alleged democracy of the USA? Censorship is always ugly no matter how you view it." Mendonca observed that judging something (literally) by its cover, such as in the attitude of the printers is typical of the brainwashed. "Anyone who took the time to look into [Akercocke's] history would recognise that we have always stated we are anything but anti-Christian. It is divisive attitudes such as this that bring about conflict. Conflict through ignorance."

These zealots were ranting and raving, and the whole thing was orchestrated by a fat imbecile.

—Jason Mendonca, Zero Tolerance

With Akercocke's gig in Belfast scheduled for Friday 18 May, BBC Northern Ireland's producers arranged a video link up to take place the Wednesday before. Shortly after the show at Rock City, the band's Mendonca and Gray appeared on the debate, but they had a four-second delay on their satellite link and could not hear what people were saying. As Terrorizer magazine pointed out, "viewers expecting a decent debate about censorship and religion witnessed Gray and Mendonca heading off criticism from both the audience and furious Christian panellists." During the debate, Mendonca said he wanted to challenge the idea that just because Akercocke play satanically motivated music, they are anti-Christian. In response, a Christian panellist promised Mendonca that he would pray for him "on the day you wake up in a pool of your own vomit." Terrorizer magazine further commented that "what could have been a heated debate between good and evil rapidly descended into farce."

The band also appeared on Nolan's radio programme, The Nolan Show, on the early morning of 17 May. Although a more measured and listenable debate took place, excitement continued to build with threats of Christian protests rumoured on the web. In the wake of a controversy, Akercocke's gig in Belfast was in danger of being cancelled. The police embargoed the gig demanding to see the band's lyrics before letting them go on stage. Despite Christian protests outside the venue and police embargo, the gig proceeded without any trouble.

== Release ==
In early-January 2007, the band released footage from the recordings through YouTube, and announced that the expected release date of Antichrist was for 14 May through Earache Records. Akercocke officially announced the title of the album in mid-March, along with its release date that had been postponed to 28 May.

== Critical reception ==
Professional ratings
Review scores
Source	Rating
AllMusic	3.5/5 stars
Decibel	9/10
Exclaim!	Favorable
Metal Hammer	9/10
Kerrang!	4/5 stars
Rock Sound	7/10
Terrorizer	8.5/10
Metal Maniacs	Favorable
Outburn	8/10
Zero Tolerance	4/5

== Track listing ==
All lyrics are written by David Gray, except where noted; all music is composed by Gray, Matt Wilcock, Peter Benjamin and Jacon Mendonça.

No.	Title	Lyrics	Length
1.	"Black Messiah"		0:56
2.	"Summon the Antichrist"		5:14
3.	"Axiom"		5:14
4.	"The Promise"		3:36
5.	"My Apterous Angel"		6:52
6.	"Distant Fires Reflect in the Eyes of Satan"		2:31
7.	"Man Without Faith or Trust"		3:27
8.	"The Dark Inside"	Gray, Mendonça	6:43
9.	"Footsteps Resound in an Empty Chapel"		4:19
10.	"Epode"	Benjamin	2:36
Total length:			41:28

Limited edition bonus tracks
No.	Title	Lyrics	Music	Length
11.	"Chapel of Ghouls" (Morbid Angel cover)	Trey Azagthoth, Mike Browning	Azagthoth	5:09
12.	"Leprosy" (Death cover)	Chuck Schuldiner	Schuldiner	6:20
Total length:				52:48

== Personnel ==
Akercocke

- Jason Mendonça – guitars, vocals
- Matt Wilcock – guitars
- Peter Benjamin – bass
- David Gray – drums

Production

- Akercocke – recording, production
- Karlos Bareham – engineering, mixing
- Adrian Breakspear – additional engineering
