= František Štorm =

Czech musician, artist and typographer (born 1966)

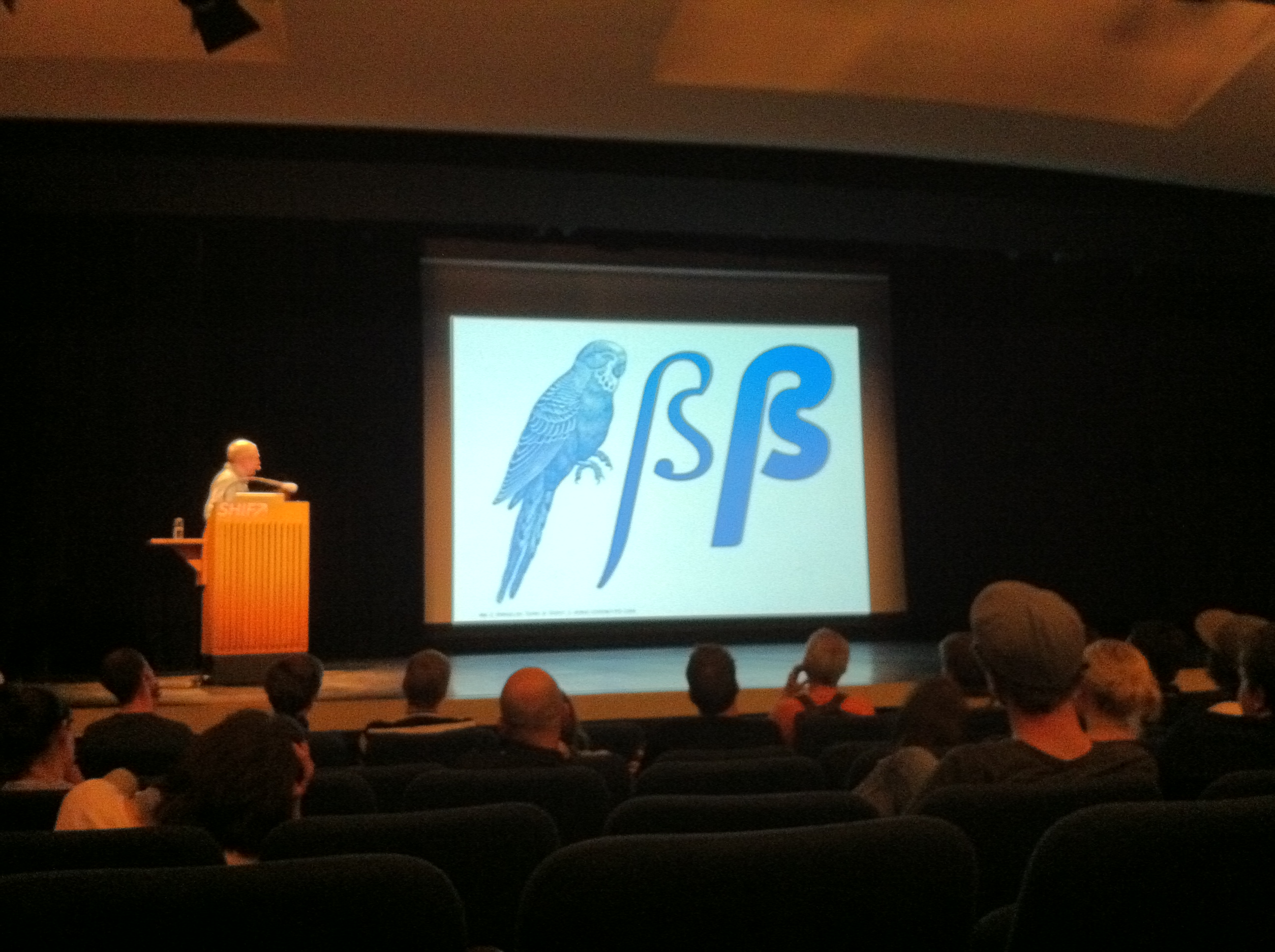
- František Štorm speaking in 2011

Background information
- Also known as: Franta Štorm
- Born: 3 July 1966 (age 60); Prague, Czechoslovakia (present-day Czech Republic)
- Genres: Black metal, avant-garde metal
- Occupations: Musician, photographer, typographer, writer, teacher, artist, illustrator, record producer
- Instruments: Vocals, electric guitar, drums
- Years active: 1987–present
- Labels: Osmose Productions, Jihosound Records
- Website: https://frantisekstorm.com/

František "Franta" Štorm (born 3 July 1966) is a Czech musician, photographer, typographer, writer, teacher, artist, illustrator and record producer, famous for being the vocalist and a founding member of the black metal band Master's Hammer.

== Biography ==
Štorm was born in Prague, in what was then Czechoslovakia, on 3 July 1966; he is the son of painter Dana Puchnarová, and grandson of architect and heraldist Břetislav Štorm. From 1981 to 1985 he studied at the Secondary School of Arts in Prague, and later went to the AAAD, where he graduated in 1991 under the guidance of Milan Hegar and Jan Solpera. After serving as Solpera's assistant for some years, from 2003 to 2008 Štorm was the headmaster of the AAAD's Department of Typography. In 1993 Štorm founded his own type foundry, which has, so far, produced more than sixty font families.

In 2005 Štorm won the Revolver Revue prize, and in 2009 he published his first book, Eseje o typografii (Essays on Typography), which was nominated to the Magnesia Litera award in the "Journalism" category but eventually lost to Radka Denemarková's Smrt, nebudeš se báti aneb Příběh Petra Lébla.

Štorm is, outside the area of typography, probably best known as the singer/guitarist of the legendary black metal band Master's Hammer, which was founded by him alongside two of his AAAD classmates, Milan Fibiger and Ferenc Feco, in 1987. Their debut album, Ritual., was released in 1991 and sold over 25,000 copies in the Czech Republic. After releasing their third album, Šlágry, in 1995, they broke up, but eventually reunited in 2009. In 2013, Štorm and his bandmates Honza "Silenthell" Přibyl and Tomáš "Necrocock" Kohout founded the record label Jihosound Records, which would release all subsequent Master's Hammer's albums. The band's most recent release was 2018's Fascinator. Štorm was also the vocalist of the band Airbrusher, founded after Master's Hammer's first demise; following the release of a self-titled album in 2007, their second album, Dirndl to Go, came out in 2021. Their third album, Latentní obrazy, came out in 2022. In 2015 he founded the side project Mortal Cabinet, which released an album, Necrotica, in the same year.

Štorm was responsible for the cover arts of Root's and Törr's 1990 debut albums Zjevení and Armageddon respectively, of Master's Hammer's albums since Vracejte konve na místo., and of Necrocock's solo albums Hudba z psychiatrických pavilonů and Houbařské album. He also illustrated an anthology of H. P. Lovecraft's complete works, in 5 volumes, published in the Czech Republic by Nakladatelství Plus between 2011 and 2013.

An enthusiast of the Indian culture, Štorm usually spends his time between his residence in South Bohemia and in the city of Margao, Goa, India, where he finds inspiration to most of his lyrical and musical themes.

== Discography ==
=== With Master's Hammer ===
For a more comprehensive list, see Master's Hammer#Discography

Year	Album
1991	Ritual.: Label: Monitor; Format: Vinyl, CD
1992	Jilemnický okultista: Label: Self-released; Format: Vinyl, CD
1995	Šlágry: Label: Kron-H; Format: Vinyl, CD
2009	Mantras: Label: Self-released; Format: Vinyl, CD
2012	Vracejte konve na místo.: Label: Self-released; Format: Vinyl, CD
2014	Vagus Vetus: Label: Jihosound Records; Format: Vinyl, CD
2016	Formulæ: Label: Jihosound Records; Format: Vinyl, CD
2018	Fascinator: Label: Jihosound Records; Format: Vinyl, CD

=== With Airbrusher ===
Year	Album
2007	Airbrusher: Label: Self-released; Format: Digital download
2021	Dirndl to Go: Label: Self-released; Format: Digital download
2022	Latentní obrazy: Label: Self-released; Format: Digital download

=== With Mortal Cabinet ===
Year	Album
2015	Necrotica: Label: ZNK; Format: Vinyl, CD
