= Martina Krupičková =

Czech artist

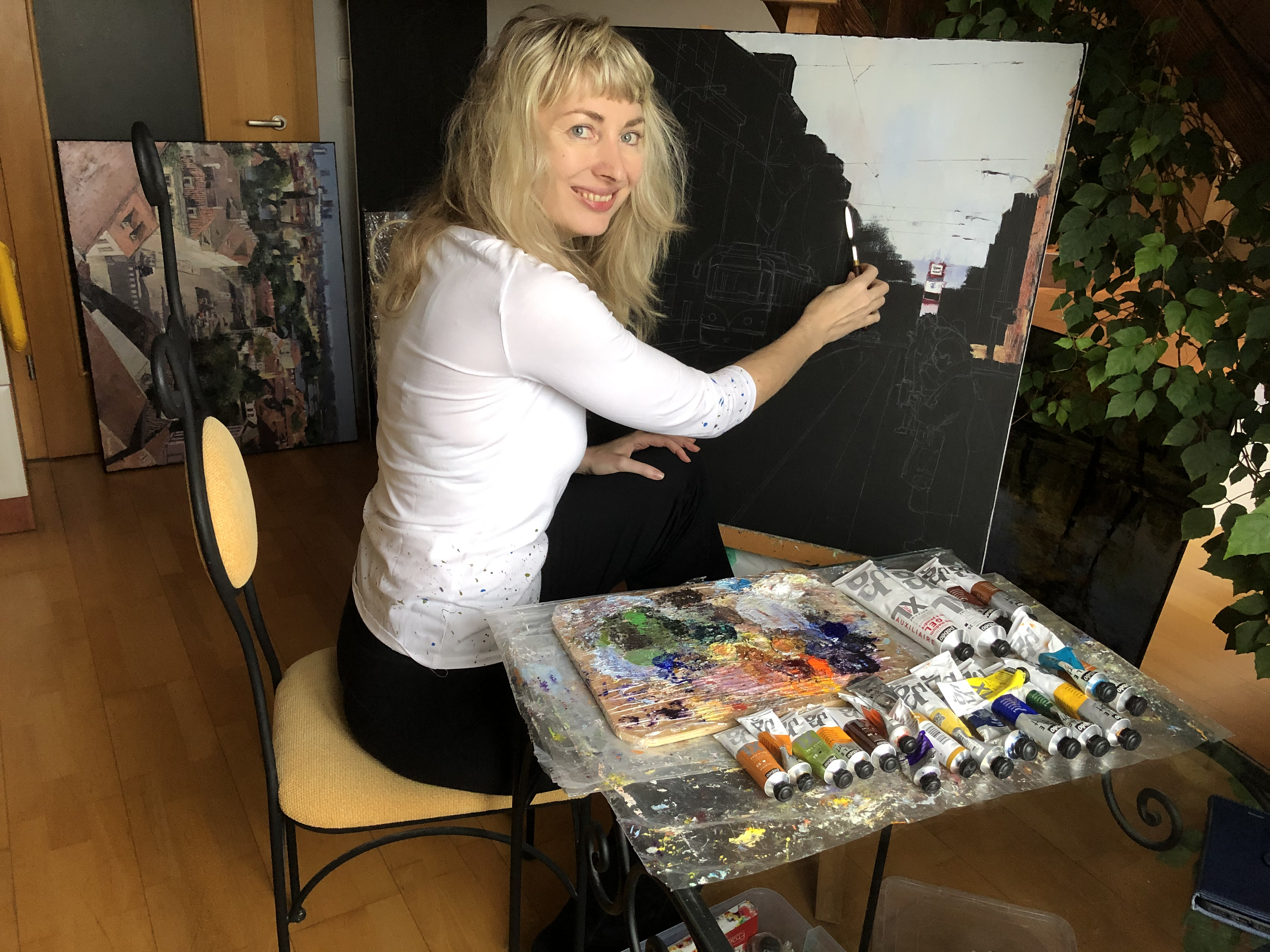
- Martina Krupičková at work.
- Born: Martina Krupičková; 15 September 1975 (age 50); Světlá nad Sázavou, Czechoslovakia
- Known for: Painter
- Movement: Contemporary Art
- Website: martinakrupickova.com

Martina Krupičková (/ˌkruːpɪtʃˈkoʊvə/) (born 15 September 1975) is a Czech oil on canvas artist.

== Early life ==
Martina Krupičková was born in the Czech town of Světlá nad Sázavou, which is approximately 100 km from Prague, Czech Republic.

In 1990, Krupičková commenced Fashion Design and Textile studies at a school in Brno. After graduating, Krupičková traveled extensively, including several months in England and the USA. In 1999, Krupičková returned to Prague and started to paint oil on a black canvas using a palette knife.

== Career ==
Krupičková has since had over 30 exhibitions, including a work in the 2008 Royal Academy Summer Exhibition.

She was interviewed on Czech Television CT1 Dobre Rano (17 June 2008), and on Czech Television CT1 in the talkshow Všechnopárty (2 June 2009).

Her work is regularly featured in Czech Auction Houses "European Arts", "Galerie Kodl", "Prague Auctions" and others.

In 2018, Krupičková was chosen as a contestant for the UK Sky Arts Landscape Artist of the Year television programme (Season 4 Heat 5). A group of selected artists were asked to paint Inveraray Castle on the shore of Loch Fyne in Scotland. The artists have to create their artwork within four hours (interrupted by interviews, camera setups and breaks) and three judges choose the winner.

== Awards ==
- February 2021: The painting "I.P.Pavlova" won 3rd place in the Painting category and 8th place in the Overall Category in the Annual Cityscapes 2021 Art Competition and the painting "No. 2 Smetanovo nábřeží" received a Special Merit Award.
- February 2020: The painting "Life in Prague During the Winter Time" won 3rd place in the Painting category and 6th place in the Overall Category in the Annual Cityscapes 2020 Art Competition and the painting "At Vyton in Prague" received a Special Merit Award.
- February 2019: The painting "Tram No 2" won 5th place in the Painting category and 9th place in the Overall Category in the Annual Cityscapes 2019 Art Competition.
- December 2018: The painting "Saltburn Pier" received the Hon. Mention in the Annual Seascapes 2018 Art Competition.
- January 2018: "Tram No. 2" won 1st Place – Painting Category and 2nd Place – Overall Category in 8th Annual Light Space Time CityScapes Art Competition 2018 and picture "Tram No 24" received Special Merit Award.
- October 2017: "Mirror" won a Special Merit Award in the Light Space Time 2017 Seascapes Art Competition.
- July 2017: "Stvoridla in Autumn Colours" won a Special Merit Award in the Light Space Time 2017 Seasons Art Competition.
- May 2017: "Stvoridla Play of Colours" won a Special Merit Award in the Light Space Time 2017 Landscapes Art Competition.
- February 2017: "Bologna" won a Special Merit Award in the Light Space Time 2017 CityScapes Art Competition.
- January 2017: "Number 14" won a Special Merit Award in the Light Space Time 2017 All Women Art Competition.
- April 2016: "River Sázava" won a Special Merit Award in the Light Space Time 2016 Landscape Art Competition.
- February 2016: "After rain in Bratislava" received a 7th Place Hon. Mention – Painting & Other Category in the Light Space Time 2016 CityScapes Art Competition and the painting "Prague Roofs" received special recognition.
- August 2015: "Odd one out" won a Special Merit Award in the Light Space Time 2015 Nature Art Competition.
- March 2014: "Number 18″ won 4th Place – Painting Category and 9th Place — Overall Category in the "CityScapes Art Competition" 2014 Art Exhibition.
- September 2013: "Paradise" won a Special Recognition Award in "Landscapes" 2013 Art Exhibition
