= Mantras (Master's Hammer album) =

Studio album by Master's Hammer
- Released: 3 December 2009
- Genre: Black metal, avant-garde metal
- Length: 54:17 (CD); 39:09 (vinyl)
- Label: Self-released
- Producer: Franta Štorm

Master's Hammer chronology
Šlágry (1995)	Mantras (2009)	Vracejte konve na místo. (2012)

Mantras is the fourth studio album by Czech black metal band Master's Hammer, independently-released on 3 December 2009. It is the band's first album of new material since Šlágry on 1995, and sees them returning to the black metal style of their first two albums, but blending it with the experimental sound demonstrated on Šlágry. It was released both in CD and vinyl format; the vinyl version contains less tracks.

The track "Vrana" is a tribute to painter Martin Vrana, a long-time friend of Master's Hammer's vocalist Franta Štorm. Vrana illustrated the album's cover art.

"Jáma pekel" was originally featured on the band's debut album, Ritual..

== Track listing ==
All lyrics are written by Franta Štorm; all music is composed by Master's Hammer (Štorm, Monster, Necrocock, Silenthell and Vlasta Voral)

No.	Title	English title	Length
1.	"Typograf"	Typographer	5:09
2.	"Domanín"		5:05
3.	"Až já budu..."	When I Am...	5:37
4.	"Čerti"	Demons	3:46
5.	"Bodhi"		4:55
6.	"Červené blato"	Red Mud	4:04
7.	"Tympan"	Kettledrum	3:14
8.	"Vrana"		5:12
9.	"Propesko"		4:02
10.	"Fantasie"	Fantasy	2:42
11.	"Ganesha mantra"		3:03
12.	"Jáma pekel"	Hell's Mouth	5:22
13.	"Epitaf"	Epitaph	2:06

=== Note ===
Tracks 9 to 12 are absent of the vinyl release.

== Personnel ==
- František "Franta" Štorm – vocals, guitar, drums, production
- Tomáš "Necrocock" Kohout – guitars
- Tomáš "Monster" Vendl – bass
- Honza "Silenthell" Přibyl – timpani
- Vlastimil "Vlasta" Voral – keyboards
- Martin Vrana – cover art
