= Master's Hammer =

Czech black metal band

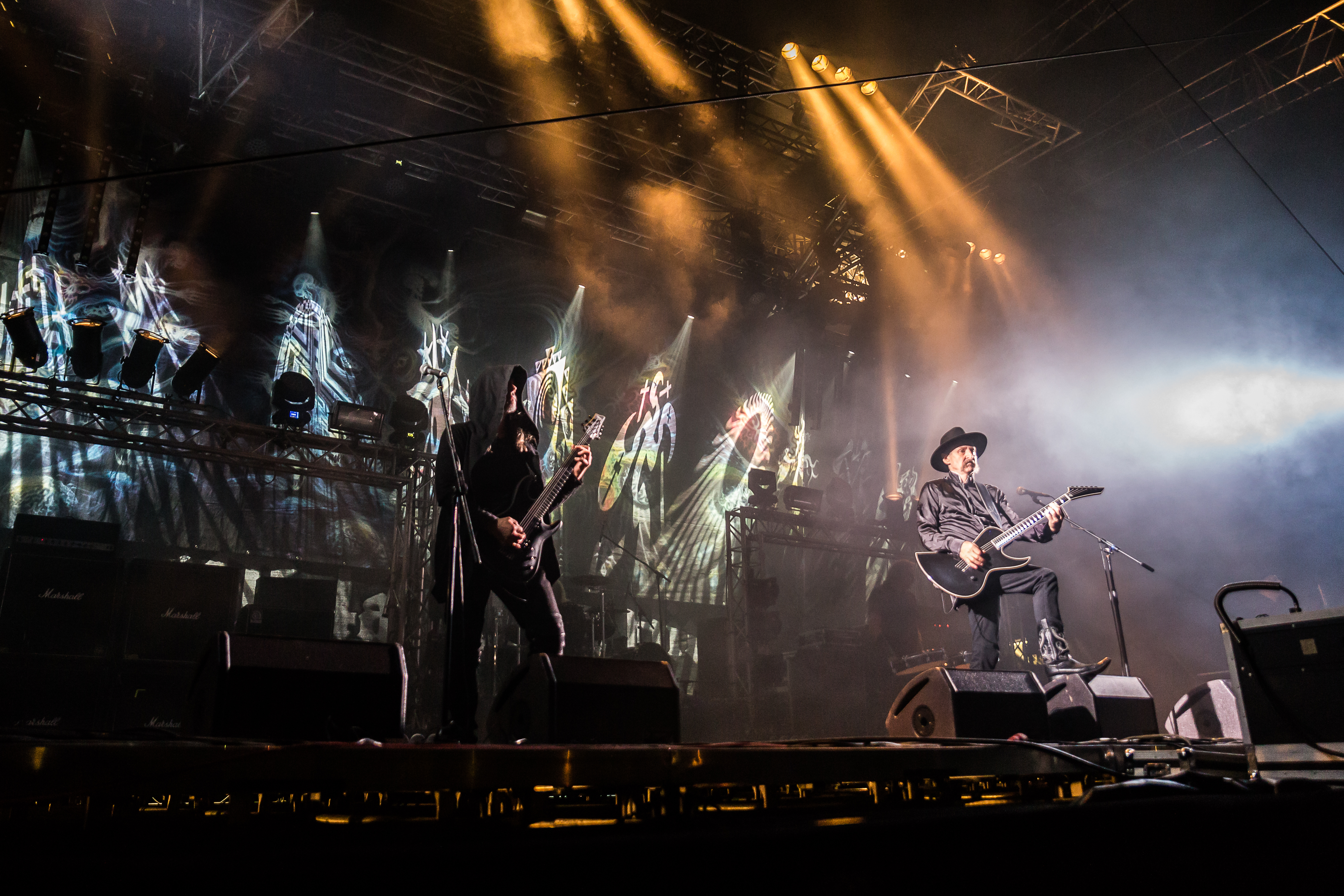
- Master's Hammer performing in 2018

Background information
- Origin: Prague, Czech Republic
- Genres: Black metal, experimental metal
- Years active: 1983–1995; 2009–2020; 2025–present
- Labels: Kron-H; Osmose; Jihosound Records
- Members: František Štorm; Tomáš Kohout; Jan Kapák; Kamil Princ
- Past members: Honza Přibyl; Petr Mecák; Petr Hošek; Karel Zástěra; František Fečo; Milan Fibiger; Oldřich Liška; Tomáš Vendl; Míla Křovina; Mirek Valenta; Vlastimil Voral
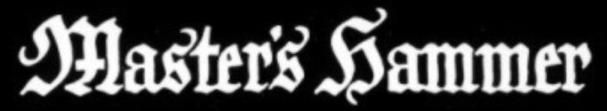

Master's Hammer is a Czech black metal band formed in Prague in 1983. They were active, with several lineup changes, until 1995, and again from 2009 until 2020. They have released eight studio albums, five demos, one EP, two split albums, two live albums, and several compilations.

== History ==
Master's Hammer was founded in 1983 and produced five demos before releasing their debut album, Ritual., in 1991. The Polish extreme metal band Behemoth covered the song "Jáma pekel" on their 2008 EP, Ezkaton. A year later, Master's Hammer issued their second record, Jilemnický okultista.

Their third album, Šlágry, came out in 1995 and shifted away from their previous work and incorporated styles outside the metal genre. At the time, the band announced that Šlágry II and a forthcoming CD-ROM would rely on professional opera singers and orchestra musicians, although neither materialized, and the band broke up that year. Ukrainian black metal band Drudkh covered the track "Indiánská píseň hrůzy" on their 2010 EP, Slavonic Chronicles, and included it on their 2014 compilation album, Eastern Frontier in Flames.

In 2009, Master's Hammer reformed and released Mantras, their first record in 14 years. In late 2012, a fifth album, Vracejte konve na místo., was released and won Best Hard and Heavy Album at that year's Anděl Awards and Best Album at the Břitva Awards.

In July 2013, Master's Hammer formed their own record label Jihosound Records, under which they released their sixth studio album in 2014, titled Vagus Vetus. On 30 May 2016, they published their seventh studio album, Formulæ, which again won the Best Hard and Heavy Album prize at the Anděl Awards.

On 8 December 2016, the band announced that they were scheduled to play at the Brutal Assault festival in August 2017, their first live performance in 25 years.

In February 2018, Master's Hammer released their eighth studio album, Fascinator.

Former bassist Tomáš "Monster" Vendl died on 26 July 2024, at the age of 52. Later that year, founding member and band leader František Štorm confirmed that the group had officially disbanded in 2020.

In October 2025, the band reunited to release their ninth studio album, Maldorör Disco, on 26 November.

== Musical style and influences ==
Master's Hammer incorporate symphonic elements into their music. Kerrang! magazine described the band's style as "fusing thrash with classical themes", and Jilemnický okultista was called "an operetta in three acts". The band was initially influenced by early extreme metal bands like Venom, Mercyful Fate, and Hellhammer.

When asked about Ritual, Fenriz, the drummer of Norwegian black metal band Darkthrone, joked that the album "is actually the first Norwegian black metal album, even though they are from Czechoslovakia". The sound on the album has drawn comparisons to Mayhem, Emperor, and Darkthrone.

On 1995's Šlágry, the band "virtually abandoned the operatic black metal of previous releases in favor of modernist electronic music" and "shares publishing credits with Carl Czerny, Otto Katz, and Giuseppe Verdi, mixing bits of metal, folk, and musique concrète into a style based on the classical avant-garde". 14 years later, Master's Hammer returned to their previous black metal style on Mantras.

== Band members ==
Current

- František "Franta" Štorm – vocals, electric guitar, bass guitar, keyboards, drums (1983–1995, 2009–2020, 2025–present)
- Tomáš "Necrocock" Kohout – electric guitar (1989–1992, 2009–2020, 2025–present)
- Jan "Honza" Kapák – drums (2011–2012, 2016–2020, 2025–present)
- Kamil Princ – keyboards (2025–present)

Past

- Milan "Bathory" Fibiger – bass guitar (1983–1989)
- František "Ferenc" Fečo – drums (1983–1989)
- Honza "Silenthell" Přibyl – timpani (1989–1992, 2009–2015, 2017–2020)
- Míla Křovina – electric guitar (1988–1989)
- Ulric For (Oldřich "Olda" Liška) – timpani (1988)
- Carles R. Apron (Karel Zástěra) – timpani (1989), drums (1989–1990)
- Vlastimil "Vlasta" Voral – keyboards (1990–1995, 2009)
- Tomáš "Monster" Vendl – bass guitar (1990–1992, 2009)
- Miroslav "Mirek" Valenta – drums (1990–1992)
- Petr "Blackie" Hošek – electric guitar (2017–2020)
- Petr "Rámus" Mecák – bass guitar (2017–2020)

== Discography ==
=== Studio albums ===
Year	Album
1991	Ritual.: Label: Monitor; Format: Vinyl, CD
1992	Jilemnický okultista: Label: Self-released; Format: Vinyl, CD
1995	Šlágry: Label: Kron-H; Format: Vinyl, CD
2009	Mantras: Label: Self-released; Format: Vinyl, CD
2012	Vracejte konve na místo.: Label: Self-released; Format: Vinyl, CD
2014	Vagus Vetus: Label: Jihosound Records; Format: Vinyl, CD
2016	Formulæ: Label: Jihosound Records; Format: Vinyl, CD
2018	Fascinator: Label: Jihosound Records; Format: Vinyl, CD
2025	Maldorör Disco: Label: Darkness Shall Rise Productions; Format: Vinyl, CD

=== Demos ===
- The Ritual Murder (1987)
- Finished (1988)
- The Mass (1989)
- The Fall of Idol (1990)
- Jilemnický okultista (1992)

=== EPs ===
- Klavierstück (1991)

=== Split albums ===
- split with Blackosh (2013)
- split with Blackosh (2014)

=== Compilations ===
- Ritual / Jilemnický okultista (2CD re-release, 2001)
- Demo Collection #1: The Ritual Murder / Live in Zbraslav (2003)
- Demo Collection #2: Finished / The Mass (2003)
- Demo Collection #3: The Fall of Idol / Jilemnický okultista (2003)
- Ritual / Jilemnický okultista (4LP re-release, 2009)
- Demos (2013)

=== Live albums ===
- Live in Zbraslav 18 May 1989 (1989)
- Live Occult Rituals (2024)
