= Ritual. (Master's Hammer album) =

Studio album by Master's Hammer
- Released: February 1991 (Czech Republic); 1994 (worldwide)
- Recorded: 5–9 December 1990 at Studio C
- Genre: Black metal
- Length: 40:03 (vinyl); 50:25 (CD)
- Labels: Monitor (Czech Republic); Osmose Productions (worldwide)
- Producer: Miloš Doležal

Master's Hammer chronology
The Fall of Idol (1990)	Ritual. (1991)	Klavierstück (1991)

Ritual. is the debut album by Czech black metal band Master's Hammer, initially released through independent label Monitor in 1991. It was later distributed elsewhere and re-released in CD format by Osmose Productions in 1994; Osmose's version contains two bonus tracks. Many tracks of the album were re-recorded from their 1990 demo tape The Fall of Idol.

The sound on the album has drawn comparisons to Mayhem, Emperor, and Darkthrone.

The track "Jáma pekel" would eventually be re-recorded for Master's Hammer's 2009 album Mantras.

Music videos were made for the tracks "Černá svatozář" and "Géniové".

The track "Útok" was dedicated to Church of Satan founder Anton LaVey.

== Covers ==
Polish blackened death metal band Behemoth covered "Jáma pekel" on their 2008 EP Ezkaton. Their version counted with a guest appearance by Root vocalist Jiří "Big Boss" Valter.

== Critical reception ==
The band once claimed that Ritual. sold over 25,000 copies in the Czech Republic alone. It is considered to be one of the major albums responsible for defining the early Czech black metal scene of the late 1980s/early to mid-1990s, alongside Root's Zjevení (1990) and Maniac Butcher's Barbarians (1995).

Rock Hard magazine featured Ritual. on their list "250 Black Metal Albums You Should Know".

Fenriz of the band Darkthrone called it "the first Norwegian black metal album, even though they are from Czechoslovakia".

In 2013, Decibel ranked Ritual. at number 40 on its list of the Top 100 Black Metal Albums of All Time.

== Track listing ==
All lyrics are written by Franta Štorm; all music is composed by Master's Hammer (Štorm, Necrocock, Monster, Mirek Valenta and Silenthell).

No.	Title	English title	Length
1.	"King of the Bohemian Forest (Intro)" (instrumental)		0:52
2.	"Pád modly"	The Fall of the Idol	6:29
3.	"Každý z nás...!"	Each of Us...!	3:30
4.	"Ritual" (instrumental)		3:16
5.	"Géniové"	Wizards	5:06
6.	"Černá svatozář"	Black Halo	5:33
7.	"Věčný návrat"	Eternal Return	3:24
8.	"Jáma pekel"	Hell's Mouth	4:18
9.	"Útok"	Attack	7:31

1994 Osmose re-release bonus tracks
No.	Title	English title	Length
9.	"Zapálili jsme onen svět"	We Have Burned the Other World	4:36
10.	"Vykoupení"	Deliverance	5:34

== Personnel ==
- František "Franta" Štorm – vocals, guitars, photography, cover art
- Tomáš "Necrocock" Kohout – guitars
- Tomáš "Monster" Vendl – bass
- Miroslav "Mirek" Valenta – drums
- Honza "Silenthell" Přibyl – timpani
- Vlastimil "Vlasta" Voral – keyboards
- Milan Fibiger – bass (on tracks 6, 7, 8 and 10)
- Miloš "Dodo" Doležal – production
