= Vracejte konve na místo. =

Studio album by Master's Hammer
- Released: 8 February 2012
- Genre: Black metal, avant-garde metal
- Length: 38:44 (CD); 44:30 (vinyl)
- Label: Self-released
- Producer: Franta Štorm

Master's Hammer chronology
Mantras (2009)	Vracejte konve na místo. (2012)	Vagus Vetus (2014)

Vracejte konve na místo. (English title: Return Your Watering Cans) is the fifth studio album by Czech black metal band Master's Hammer, independently released on 8 February 2012. It was released both on vinyl and CD format; the vinyl version contains two bonus tracks.

The album won the Anděl Award 2012 in the category Hard & Heavy.

As their names imply, the tracks "Lovecraft" and "Flammarion" are tributes to horror writer H. P. Lovecraft and astronomer Camille Flammarion, respectively.

== Track listing ==
All lyrics are written by Franta Štorm; all music is composed by Master's Hammer (Štorm, Necrocock and Honza Kapák).

No.	Title	English title	Length
1.	"Nordfrostkrampfland"		4:18
2.	"Šumava"		4:59
3.	"Ve vichru nicoty"	In a Whirlwind of Nothingness	3:54
4.	"Námořnická"	Sea's [Song]	3:22
5.	"Podejte mi samopal"	Hand Me a Machine Gun	2:41
6.	"Vracejte konve na místo"	Return the Watering Cans To [Their] Place	3:38
7.	"Lovecraft"		4:16
8.	"Flammarion"		4:48
9.	"Lingam a mikve"	Lingam and Mikveh	2:50
10.	"Pantheismus dobra"	Pantheism of Good	4:03

Vinyl release bonus tracks
No.	Title	Length
6.	"Dreaming Bulldog (Intermezzo)" (instrumental)	1:29
12.	"Flammarion (Fatal Mix)"	4:19

== Personnel ==
- František "Franta" Štorm – vocals, guitar, bass, keyboards, cover art, production
- Tomáš "Necrocock" Kohout – backing vocals, guitar
- Jan "Honza" Kapák – drums
- Joe Harper – Jew's harp, throat singing (on tracks 2, 5 and 11), samples
- Petr "Blackie" Hošek – mastering, photography
