= Akercocke =

English extreme metal band

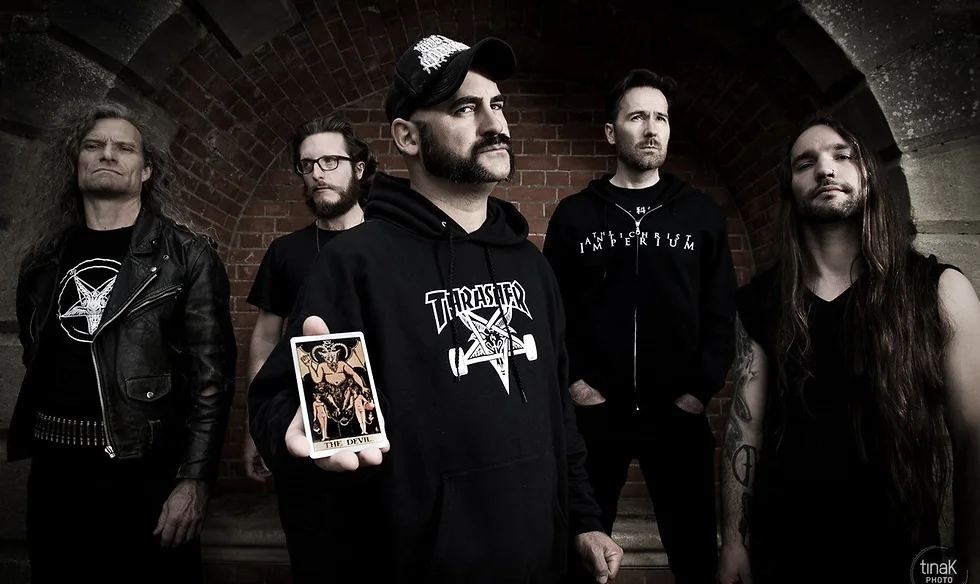
- From left to right: Paul Scanlan, Sam Loynes, Jason Mendonça, David Gray, and Federico Benini

Background information
- Origin: London, England, UK
- Genres: Blackened death metal, progressive metal
- Years active: 1997–2012, 2016–present
- Labels: Goat of Mendes, Peaceville, Earache
- Spinoffs: Voices, The Antichrist Imperium
- Members: Jason Mendonça; David Gray; Sam Loynes; Kieren Allan; Quinton Lucion
- Past members: Paul Scanlan; Rob Archibald; Peter Theobalds; Martin Bonsoir; Daniel "The Ritz" Reeves; Matt Wilcock; Peter Benjamin; Dan Knight; Nathanael Underwood; Federico Benini

Akercocke are an English extreme metal band from London, formed in 1997 by Jason Mendonça and David Gray. The band also features Paul Scanlan.

== History ==
Akercocke self-released their first album, Rape of the Bastard Nazarene, in 1999. Akercocke signed to Peaceville Records and released The Goat of Mendes in 2001. It reached number 4 in Terrorizer's album of the year chart. In 2003, the album Choronzon was released through Earache Records. Terrorizer voted it number 1 metal release of the year. Paul Scanlan left the band after this album. Ex-Abramelin guitarist Matt Wilcock replaced him.

Words That Go Unspoken, Deeds That Go Undone was released in October 2005. On 18 January 2007, Peter Theobalds left the band and Peter Benjamin replaced him.

Akercocke released their fifth album, Antichrist, in May 2007. Whilst touring to promote the album, the anti-Christian nature of their music generated controversy in Northern Ireland when they scheduled a tour date in Belfast on 18 May 2007, and appeared on BBC1's debate show Nolan Live on 16 May 2007 to defend their right to play there. The band broke up in 2012 following long periods of inactivity.

Akercocke surprise-reunited in 2016. Original lead guitarist Paul Scanlan returned to the band with new bassist Nathanael Underwood. The band posted the song "Inner Sanctum" on YouTube on 18 June 2017. The launch of an official website on 25 April 2016 was followed on 26 April 2016 with the announcement of a series of reunion shows, starting with Bloodstock Open Air 2016 and a full UK tour. The album Renaissance in Extremis was released on 25 August 2017, their first full-length album in a decade since 2007's Antichrist. In May 2021, the band began recording an album. Bassist Federico Benini drowned to death off the coast of Colombia on 21 May 2026.

== Members ==
Current

- Jason Mendonça – vocals, guitars (1997–2012, 2016–present)
- David Gray – drums (1997–2012, 2016–present)
- Sam Loynes – keyboards (2010–2012, 2016–present)
- Kieren Allan – bass (2025–present)
- Quinton Lucion – guitars (2025–present)

Former

- Paul Scanlan – guitars (1997–2003, 2016–2025)
- Martin Bonsoir – keyboards (1997–2003)
- Peter Theobalds – bass (1997–2006)
- Daniel "The Ritz" Reeves – keyboards (2004–2006)
- Matt Wilcock – guitars (2004–2010)
- Peter Benjamin – bass (2006–2012)
- Rob Archibald – keyboards (2006–2010)
- Dan Knight – guitars (2010–2012)
- Nathanael Underwood – bass (2016–2018)
- Federico Benini – bass (2019–2025; died 2026)

Timeline

== Discography ==
Studio albums

- Rape of the Bastard Nazarene (1999)
- The Goat of Mendes (2001)
- Choronzon (2003)
- Words That Go Unspoken, Deeds That Go Undone (2005)
- Antichrist (2007)
- Renaissance in Extremis (2017)

Live albums

- Decades of Devil Worship (2023)
