= Symphonic black metal =

Subgenre of black metal music

- Stylistic origins: Symphonic metal; black metal
- Cultural origins: Early to mid 1990s, Norway and United Kingdom

Symphonic black metal is a subgenre of black metal that emerged in the 1990s and incorporates symphonic and orchestral elements.

== History ==
One of the earliest forerunners in what would come to be the sound of symphonic metal was Celtic Frost on their 1987 album Into the Pandemonium. The first extreme metal bands incorporating classical, orchestral, and operatic elements into their music were Mekong Delta, Bulldozer on their album Neurodeliri (1988), Believer on Sanity Obscure (1990) and Dimensions (1993), Master's Hammer on Ritual (1991) and Jilemnický okultista (1992 demo and 1993 album) and Sigh on their debut Scorn Defeat (1993).

The style on Emperor's In the Nightside Eclipse (1994) had a pioneering influence though and was the main inspiration for many keyboard-based black metal bands following after. Troll's Drep de kristne (1995) and Arcturus' Aspera Hiems Symfonia (1996) are other notable early works of symphonic black metal, before the genre was commercialised by the international success of bands like Dimmu Borgir and Bal-Sagoth.

== Characteristics ==
Symphonic black metal is a style of black metal that incorporates symphonic and orchestral elements. This may include the usage of keyboards to conjure up "pseudo-orchestral" soundscapes with default presets (e.g. strings, choirs, piano, organs, and pads), or full orchestral arrangements. Bands may feature solo instruments such as violins in addition to keyboards and/or orchestral arrangements. Vocals can be "clean" or operatic in style, and song structures are more defined or are inspired by symphonies, and follow a typical riff-based approach. Many of the characteristics of traditional black metal are retained, such as shrieks, fast tempos, high treble and tremolo-picked electric guitars. The overall sound and themes can be considered wider than traditional black metal, many groups of symphonic black metal use themes such as vampirism (Theatres des Vampires, Cradle of Filth), occultism and the paranormal (Carach Angren). Political themes are more neglected by them as in other black metal subgenres.

== See also ==
- List of symphonic black metal bands
