= List of drummers =

This is a list of notable drummers that meet Wikipedia's notability guideline for inclusion.

== A ==
- Remu Aaltonen (Hurriganes)
- Vinnie Paul Abbott (Pantera, Damageplan, Hellyeah)
- Dave Abbruzzese (Pearl Jam)
- Matt Abts (Gov't Mule)
- Alex Acuña (Weather Report, Lee Ritenour)
- Daniel Adair (Nickelback, 3 Doors Down)
- Charlie Adams (Yanni, Chameleon)
- Chris Adler (Lamb of God, Megadeth)
- Henry Adler
- Steven Adler (Guns N' Roses, Adler's Appetite)
- Rob Affuso (Skid Row)
- Charly Alberti (Soda Stereo)
- Tommy Aldridge (Black Oak Arkansas, Ted Nugent, Motörhead, Ozzy Osbourne, Whitesnake)
- Tim "Herb" Alexander (Primus)
- Rashied Ali
- Carl Allen
- Rick Allen (Def Leppard)
- Tony Allen (Fela Kuti)
- Barry Altschul
- Vinnie Amico (moe.)
- Andy Anderson (The Cure)
- Nicke Andersson (Entombed)
- Phil Anselmo (Viking Crown)
- Carmine Appice (Vanilla Fudge, Cactus, Beck, Bogert & Appice, Rod Stewart, King Kobra, Blue Murder)
- Vinny Appice (Black Sabbath, Dio, Heaven and Hell)
- Fernando Arbex (Barrabás)
- Kenny Aronoff (John Mellencamp, The Smashing Pumpkins, John Fogerty)
- Duncan Arsenault (The Curtain Society)
- Steve Asheim (Deicide)
- Scott Asheton (The Stooges)
- Sampsa "Kita" Astala (Lordi)
- Nick Augusto (Trivium)
- Jerry Augustyniak (10,000 Maniacs)
- Mick Avory (The Kinks)
- Martin Axenrot (Witchery, Bloodbath, Opeth)
- Carla Azar (Autolux)

== B ==
- Robbie Bachman (Bachman–Turner Overdrive)
- Johnny "Bee" Badanjek (The Detroit Wheels, The Rockets)
- Donald Bailey
- Mike Baird
- Ginger Baker (Cream, Blind Faith)
- Donny Baldwin, (Jefferson Starship)
- Butch Ballard
- Frankie Banali (Quiet Riot, W.A.S.P.)
- Paul Barbarin
- David Barbarossa (Adam and the Ants, Bow Wow Wow)
- John Barbata (Jefferson Airplane)
- Lori Barbero
- Danny Barcelona (Louis Armstrong)
- Nick Barker (Cradle of Filth, Dimmu Borgir, Lock Up, Brujeria, Old Man's Child)
- Travis Barker (The Aquabats, Blink-182, Box Car Racer, Transplants, +44)
- Brandon Barnes (Rise Against)
- Barriemore Barlow (Jethro Tull)
- Joey Baron (Laurie Anderson)
- Ranjit Barot
- Carlton Barrett (Bob Marley and The Wailers)
- Angel Bartolotta (Team Cybergeist, Dope, Genitorturers)
- Frank Beard (ZZ Top)
- Carter Beauford (Dave Matthews Band)
- Jay Bellerose
- Louie Bellson
- Leila Bela (Pigface)
- Meridjo Belobi (Zaïko Langa Langa)
- Fred Below
- Charlie Benante (Anthrax, S.O.D.)
- Benny Benjamin (Motown, The Funk Brothers)
- Brian Bennett (The Shadows, Marty Wilde)
- David Bennett
- Taz Bentley (The Reverend Horton Heat, Burden Brothers)
- James Bergstrom (Alice N' Chains, Second Coming)
- Bill Berry (R.E.M.)
- Wuv Bernardo (P.O.D.)
- Pete Best (The Beatles)
- Bev Bevan (The Move, Electric Light Orchestra)
- Graham Bidstrup (The Angels)
- Les Binks (Judas Priest)
- Chuck Biscuits (D.O.A., Black Flag, Danzig)
- Gregg Bissonette (David Lee Roth)
- Curt Bisquera (Elton John, Mick Jagger)
- Jason Bittner (Shadows Fall)
- Cedric Bixler-Zavala (De Facto)
- Jonas Björler (At the Gates)
- Jet Black (The Stranglers)
- Jimmy Carl Black (The Mothers of Invention)
- Cindy Blackman
- Ed Blackwell
- John Blackwell
- Brian Blade (Joni Mitchell)
- Hal Blaine
- Art Blakey
- Michael Bland
- Jan Axel Blomberg (Arcturus, Mayhem, The Kovenant, Dimmu Borgir, Jørn Lande)
- Ryan Alexander Bloom (Havok)
- Bobby Blotzer (Ratt)
- Felix Bohnke (Edguy)
- Mickey Bones
- Jim Bonfanti (Raspberries)
- Bongo Joe Coleman
- Jason Bonham (Bonham, Black Country Communion)
- John Bonham (Led Zeppelin)
- Oskar "Ossi" Bonde (Johnossi)
- Paddy Boom (Scissor Sisters)
- Mike Bordin (Faith No More)
- Paul Bostaph (Forbidden, Slayer, Exodus, Testament)
- Mike Botts (Bread)
- Albert Bouchard (Blue Öyster Cult)
- Roy Boulter (The Farm)
- Rob Bourdon (Linkin Park)
- Garry "Magpie" Bowler (Würzel, Dennis Stratton)
- Moses Boyd
- Terry Bozzio (Frank Zappa, Missing Persons, Korn)
- Mick Bradley (Steamhammer)
- Jerome Brailey (Parliament-Funkadelic )
- Matt Brann (Avril Lavigne)
- Riley Breckenridge (Thrice)
- Don Brewer (Grand Funk Railroad)
- Billy Brimblecom (Blackpool Lights)
- Ned Brower (Rooney)
- Harold Brown (War)
- Mick Brown (Dokken, Lynch Mob, Ted Nugent)
- Ian Browne (Matthew Good Band)
- Bill Bruford (Bruford, Genesis, King Crimson, Yes)
- Bob Bryar (My Chemical Romance)
- Mike Buck
- Rick Buckler (The Jam)
- Budgie (Siouxsie and the Banshees, The Creatures, The Slits)
- Clive Bunker (Jethro Tull)
- Larry Bunker
- Richard James Burgess (Landscape)
- Aaron Burckhard (Nirvana)
- Chuck Burgi (Billy Joel)
- Clem Burke (Blondie, The Romantics, Eurythmics, Ramones)
- Dominik Burkhalter
- Hugo Burnham (Gang Of Four)
- Bob Burns (Lynyrd Skynyrd)
- Clive Burr (Iron Maiden)
- Andrew Burrows (Razorlight)
- Ron Bushy (Iron Butterfly)
- Frank Butler

== C ==
- David Calabrese (The Misfits, Graves, Dr. Chud's X-Ward)
- Will Calhoun (Living Colour)
- Phill Calvert (The Birthday Party)
- Matt Cameron (Soundgarden, Pearl Jam)
- Jeff Campitelli (Joe Satriani)
- Brendan Canty (Fugazi)
- Jim Capaldi (Traffic)
- Frank Capp
- Danny Carey (Tool, Pigmy Love Circus)
- Keith Carlock (Steely Dan, James Taylor, Donald Fagen, Walter Becker, John Mayer, Sting}
- Bun E. Carlos (Cheap Trick)
- Denny Carmassi (Montrose, Heart, Coverdale•Page, Whitesnake)
- Patrick Carney (The Black Keys)
- Karen Carpenter (The Carpenters)
- Eric Carr (Kiss)
- Randy Carr (Social Distortion)
- Terri Lyne Carrington
- Adam Carson (AFI)
- Michael Cartellone (Damn Yankees, Lynyrd Skynyrd)
- Ernest Carter (E Street Band)
- Michael Carvin
- Eloy Casagrande (Sepultura, Slipknot)
- Ed Cassidy (Rising Sons, Spirit)
- Torry Castellano (The Donnas)
- Joey Castillo (Queens of the Stone Age, Danzig)
- Randy Castillo (Ozzy Osbourne, Lita Ford, Mötley Crüe)
- Deen Castronovo (Journey, Bad English, Steve Vai, GZR, Tony MacAlpine, Ozzy Osbourne, Hardline, Cacophony, Marty Friedman, Paul Rodgers)
- Igor Cavalera (Cavalera Conspiracy, Sepultura)
- Cerrone
- Chris Cester (Jet)
- Romeo Challenger (Showaddywaddy, Black Widow)
- Jimmy Chamberlin (The Smashing Pumpkins, Jimmy Chamberlin Complex, Zwan)
- Dennis Chambers
- Martin Chambers (The Pretenders)
- Will Champion (Coldplay)
- Chad Channing (Nirvana)
- Dave Charles (Help Yourself, Dave Edmunds, Kid Creole and the Coconuts)
- Brian Chase (Yeah Yeah Yeahs)
- Arup Chattopadhyay (Indian tabla player)
- Damon Che (Don Caballero)
- Régine Chassagne (Arcade Fire)
- Gary Chester
- Terry Chimes (The Clash, Black Sabbath)
- Brian Chippendale (Lightning Bolt, Mindflayer)
- Brian Choper
- Richard Christy (Death, Control Denied, Iced Earth, Charred Walls of the Damned)
- Kenny Clare
- Chad Clark
- Dave Clark (The Dave Clark Five)
- Kenny Clarke
- Michael Clarke (The Byrds)
- Louie Clemente (Testament)
- Doug Clifford (Creedence Clearwater Revival)
- Jimmy Cobb
- Billy Cobham (Mahavishnu Orchestra)
- King Coffey (Butthole Surfers)
- John Coghlan (Status Quo)
- Vinnie Colaiuta (Frank Zappa, Sting, Joni Mitchell)
- Cozy Cole
- Claude Coleman (Ween)
- Marino Colina
- Grant Collins
- Nic Collins (Genesis, Mike and the Mechanics, Better Strangers, The Effect).
- Phil Collins (Genesis, Brand X, Flaming Youth, Frida)
- Simon Collins
- Bobby Colomby (Blood, Sweat & Tears)
- Ricardo Confessori (Angra, Shaaman)
- Gerry Conway
- Paul Cook (Sex Pistols)
- Tré Cool (Green Day, Foxboro Hot Tubs, The Network, The Lookouts)
- Jason Cooper (The Cure)
- Stewart Copeland (Curved Air, The Police, Animal Logic, Oysterhead)
- Caroline Corr (The Corrs)
- Jody Cortez (Christopher Cross, Billy Idol)
- Billy Cotton
- John Cowsill (The Beach Boys)
- Scott Crago (Eagles, Sheryl Crow, Stevie Wonder)
- Shawn "Clown" Crahan (Slipknot)
- Peter Criss (Kiss)
- Dale Crover (Melvins, Nirvana)
- Dave Culross
- Abe Cunningham (Deftones)
- Mickey Curry (Bryan Adams, Hall & Oates, The Cult)
- Chris Curtis (The Searchers)
- Chris Cutler (Henry Cow, Art Bears)

== D ==
- Diesel Dahl (TNT)
- Brann Dailor (Mastodon)
- Dino Danelli (Young Rascals, The Rascals)
- Marc Danzeisen (Riverdogs, Gilby Clarke, Little Caesar)
- Jay Dee Daugherty (Patti Smith Group)
- Chris Dave (Robert Glasper, D'Angelo)
- Adrienne Davies (Earth)
- Bevan Davies (Madfly, Comes with the Fall, Danzig)
- Billie Davies
- Cliff Davies (If, Ted Nugent)
- Dennis Davis (David Bowie)
- Mikkey Dee (King Diamond, Motörhead, Scorpions)
- Pete de Freitas (Echo & the Bunnymen)
- Jimmy DeGrasso (Alice Cooper, Lita Ford, Ozzy Osbourne, White Lion, Suicidal Tendencies, Y&T, Megadeth)
- Jack DeJohnette
- John Densmore (The Doors)
- Eric Delaney
- Victor DeLorenzo (Violent Femmes)
- Trav Demsey (The Living End)
- Manuel De Peppe
- Jerome Deupree (Morphine)
- Liberty DeVitto (Billy Joel)
- Werner "Zappi" Diermaier (Faust)
- Adam Deitch (Lettuce)
- Dennis Diken (The Smithereens)
- Jerome Dillon (Nine Inch Nails)
- Klaus Dinger (Kraftwerk)
- Josh Dion (Chuck Loeb)
- Steve DiStanislao (CPR, David Gilmour)
- Baby Dodds
- Brian Doherty (They Might Be Giants, John Linnell)
- Micky Dolenz (The Monkees)
- John Dolmayan (System of a Down, Scars on Broadway)
- Howard Donald (Take That)
- Virgil Donati (Planet X, Ring of Fire, Seven the Hardway, CAB, Derek Sherinian, Tony MacAlpine, Steve Vai)
- Mitch Dorge (Crash Test Dummies)
- Paul Doucette (Matchbox Twenty)
- Dave Douglas (Relient K, Agnes)
- Brian Downey (Thin Lizzy)
- Hamid Drake
- Gary Driscoll (Rainbow, Elf)
- Shawn Drover (Megadeth)
- Steven Drozd (The Flaming Lips)
- Greg Drudy (Interpol, Saetia, Hot Cross)
- Spencer Dryden (Jefferson Airplane)
- Josh Dun (Twenty One Pilots, House of Heroes)
- Aynsley Dunbar
- Sly Dunbar
- Mario Duplantier (Gojira)
- Alex Duthart
- Nick D'Virgilio (Genesis, Tears for Fears, Spock's Beard)
- Orri Páll Dýrason (Sigur Rós)

== E ==
- Sheila E. (Prince)
- Roger Earl (Foghat)
- Brent Eccles (The Angels)
- Graeme Edge (The Moody Blues)
- Kian Egan (Westlife)
- Phil Ehart (Kansas)
- Greg Eklund (Everclear, The Oohlas)
- Blas Elias (Slaughter)
- Manny Elias (Tears for Fears)
- Bobby Elliott (The Hollies)
- Dennis Elliott (Foreigner)
- Stuart Elliott (The Alan Parsons Project, Kate Bush, Steve Harley & Cockney Rebel)
- Greg Elmore (Quicksilver Messenger Service)
- Sonny Emory
- Jim Eno (Spoon)
- Lorne Entress
- Josh Eppard (Coheed and Cambria)
- Adrian Erlandsson (At the Gates, The Haunted, Cradle of Filth, Brujeria, Paradise Lost)
- Daniel Erlandsson (Arch Enemy, Carcass)
- Greg Errico (Sly and the Family Stone)
- Peter Erskine (Weather Report)
- Lester Estelle Jr. (Stars Go Dim, Pillar)
- Guy Evans (Van der Graaf Generator)
- Mark Escueta (Rivermaya)

== F ==
- Tony Fagenson (Eve 6, The Sugi Tap)
- Richard Falomir (The Aquabats)
- Danny Farrant (Buzzcocks)
- Jon Farriss (INXS)
- Zac Farro (Paramore)
- Ricky Fataar (The Beach Boys, The Flames)
- Tats Faustino
- Chris Fehn (Slipknot)
- John Fell (The Heroine Sheiks)
- Fenriz (Darkthrone)
- Frank Ferrer (Guns N' Roses)
- Steve Ferrone (Tom Petty and the Heartbreakers, Average White Band)
- Billy Ficca (Television)
- Alvin Fielder
- Anton Fier (The Golden Palominos)
- Anton Fig (Frehley's Comet, Cyndi Lauper, CBS Orchestra, Joe Bonamassa)
- Monika Fikerle (Love of Diagrams)
- Ginger Fish (Marilyn Manson)
- Eddie Fisher (OneRepublic)
- Jon Fishman (Phish)
- Snowy Fleet (The Easybeats)
- Mick Fleetwood (Fleetwood Mac, John Mayall & the Bluesbreakers)
- Blake Fleming (The Mars Volta)
- Chuck Flores
- Matt Flynn (Maroon 5)
- Justin Foley (Killswitch Engage, Blood Has Been Shed)
- Steve Foley (The Replacements, Curtiss A)
- D. J. Fontana (Elvis Presley)
- Sam Fogarino (Interpol)
- Shannon Forrest
- Andrew Forsman (The Fall of Troy)
- Keith Forsey (Giorgio Moroder productions, Donna Summer, Boney M.
- Al Foster
- Jimmy Fox (James Gang)
- Lucas Fox (Motörhead)
- Christopher Franke (Tangerine Dream, Agitation Free)
- Chris Frantz (Talking Heads)
- John French
- Josh Freese (The Vandals, A Perfect Circle, Guns N' Roses, New Radicals, Nine Inch Nails, Black Light Burns, Sublime with Rome, Devo, Foo Fighters)
- Tristan Fry (Sky)
- Frost (Satyricon, 1349)
- Mike Fuentes (Pierce the Veil, Isles & Glaciers)
- Travis Fullerton
- Peter Furler (Newsboys)

== G ==
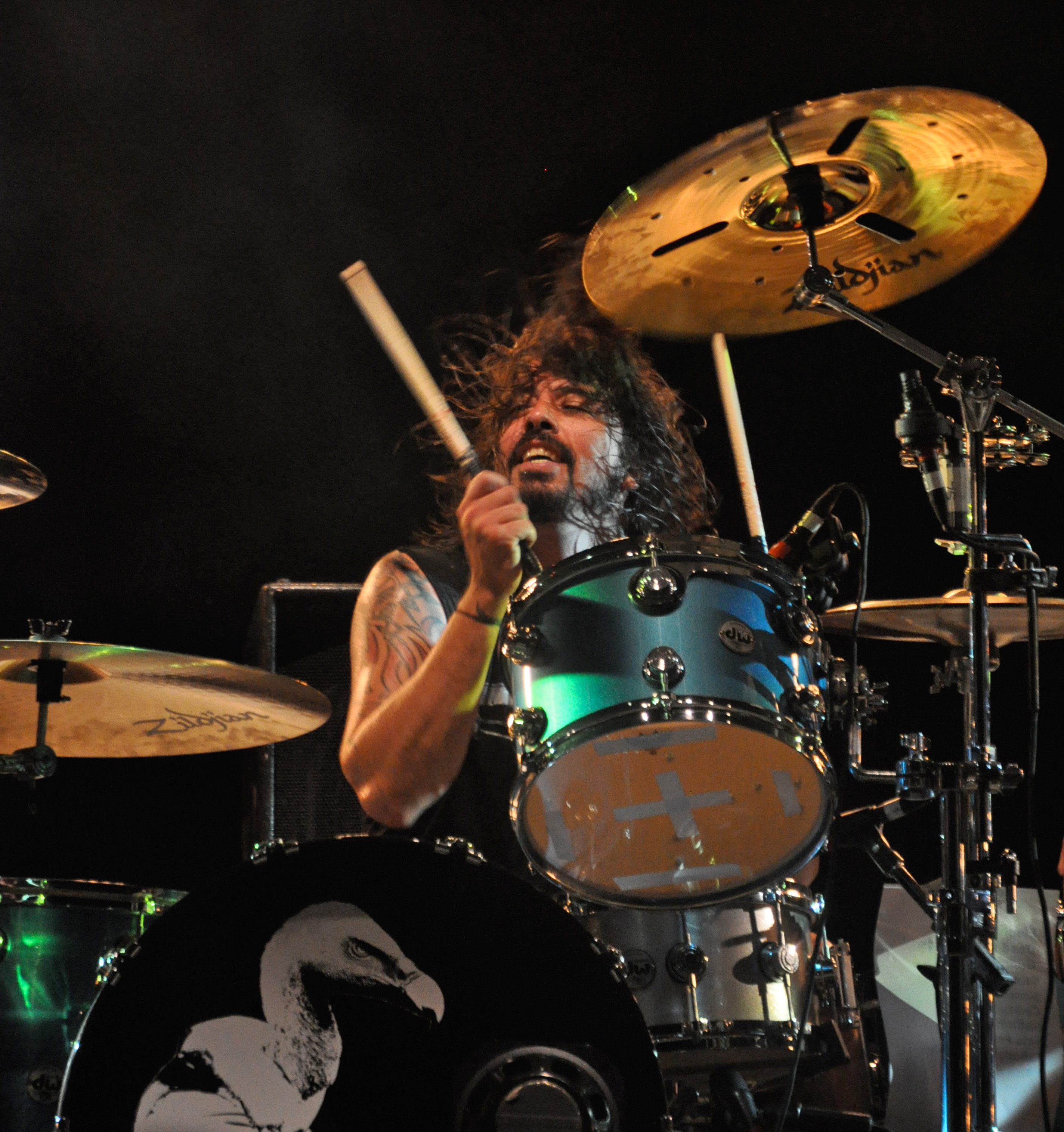
Dave Grohl

- Steve Gadd (Paul Simon, Eric Clapton, Steely Dan)
- Stéphane Galland (Aka Moon, Zap Mama, Octurn)
- Glen "Archie" Gamble (Helix)
- Allan Ganley
- Jeremy Gara (Arcade Fire)
- Rob Gardner (Guns N' Roses)
- David Garibaldi (Tower of Power)
- Matt Garstka (Animals as Leaders)
- Bruce Gary (The Knack)
- Josh Garza (The Secret Machines)
- Jerry Gaskill (King's X)
- Jean-Paul Gaster (Clutch, The Bakerton Group)
- Bud Gaugh (Sublime, Eyes Adrift)
- Mel Gaynor (Simple Minds)
- Rafael Gayol (Leonard Cohen)
- Bjorn Gelotte (In Flames)
- Liam Genockey (Steeleye Span)
- Frank Gibson Jr.
- Peter Giger
- Michael Giles (King Crimson)
- Martin Gilks (The Wonder Stuff)
- Pete Gill (Saxon, Motörhead)
- Aaron Gillespie (Underoath, The Almost)
- Benjamin Gillies (Silverchair)
- Russell Gilbrook (Uriah Heep)
- Marco Giovino
- Danny Goffey (Supergrass)
- Alex González (Maná)
- Danny Gottlieb (Pat Metheny Group, Mahavishnu Orchestra)
- Jim Gordon (Derek and the Dominos, Traffic)
- Steve Gorman (The Black Crowes)
- Phil Gould (Level 42)
- Chad Gracey (Live, The Gracious Few)
- Bobby Graham
- Ed Graham (The Darkness)
- Sebastien Grainger (Death from Above 1979)
- Derek Grant (Alkaline Trio)
- Steve Grantley (Stiff Little Fingers)
- Milford Graves
- Rocky Gray (Evanescence, Machina)
- Jeremiah Green (Modest Mouse)
- Nate Greenslit (H.U.M.A.N.W.I.N.E.)
- Sonny Greer (Duke Ellington)
- Adrian Griffin (28 Days)
- Dale Griffin (Mott the Hoople)
- Dave Grohl (Scream, Nirvana, Foo Fighters, Queens of the Stone Age, Tenacious D, Them Crooked Vultures)
- Andy "Stoker" Growcott (Dexys Midnight Runners, General Public)
- Trilok Gurtu

== H ==
- Tomas Haake (Meshuggah)
- Sib Hashian (Boston)
- Kai Hahto (Wintersun, Max On The Rox)
- Tony Hajjar (At the Drive-In, Sparta)
- Omar Hakim (Sting, Weather Report, Dire Straits, Madonna)
- Tubby Hall
- Chico Hamilton
- Jeff Hamilton
- Hein Frode Hansen (Theatre of Tragedy)
- Simon Hanson (Squeeze)
- Zac Hanson
- Beaver Harris
- Gavin Harrison (Porcupine Tree, King Crimson)
- Oscar Harrison (Ocean Colour Scene)
- Grant Hart (Hüsker Dü)
- Mickey Hart (Grateful Dead)
- Jason Hartless (Ted Nugent)
- John Hartman (The Doobie Brothers)
- Kevin Haskins (Bauhaus)
- Steve Hass (John Scofield, Ravi Coltrane, The Manhattan Transfer, Suzanne Vega, Cher)
- Jordan Hastings (Alexisonfire)
- John Haughm (Agalloch)
- Ian Haugland (Europe, Brazen Abbot, Clockwise, Last Autumn's Dream, Baltimoore)
- Roger Hawkins (Muscle Shoals Rhythm Section, Traffic)
- Taylor Hawkins (Alanis Morissette, Foo Fighters, Taylor Hawkins and the Coattail Riders)
- Roy Haynes
- Richie Hayward (Little Feat)
- Topper Headon (The Clash)
- Albert "Tootie" Heath
- Matt Helders (Arctic Monkeys)
- Levon Helm (The Band)
- Gerry Hemingway (Anthony Braxton)
- Don Henley (The Eagles)
- Bob Henrit (The Kinks)
- Raymond Herrera (Fear Factory)
- Paul Hester (Split Enz, Crowded House)
- Steve Hewitt (Placebo)
- Billy Higgins
- Zach Hill (Hella)
- Steve Hindalong
- Rob Hirst (Midnight Oil)
- Jon Hiseman (Graham Bond Organisation, Colosseum, Tempest, Colosseum II)
- Bryan Hitt (REO Speedwagon, Wang Chung)
- Nick Hodgson (Kaiser Chiefs)
- Guy Hoffman (BoDeans, Violent Femmes)
- Scott Hoffman (38 Special, O-Town, AJ McLean)
- Gene Hoglan (Death, Strapping Young Lad, Dethklok, Testament)
- Mike Holoway
- Dave Holland (Judas Priest)
- Gary Holland (Dokken, Great White, Blue Cheer)
- Luke Holland (The Word Alive, I See Stars, Tyler Carter, Miss Fortune, The Evening)
- W. S. Holland (Tennessee Three)
- Malcolm Holmes (Orchestral Manoeuvres in the Dark)
- Bob Holz (Larry Coryell)
- Josh Homme (Eagles of Death Metal)
- Stix Hooper (The Jazz Crusaders)
- Reidar "Horgh" Horghagen (Immortal, Hypocrisy)
- Michael Hossack (The Doobie Brothers)
- Dominic Howard (Muse)
- Stet Howland
- Earl Hudson (Bad Brains)
- Daniel Humair
- Dann Hume (Evermore)
- Will Hunt (Dark New Day, Evanescence)
- Andy Hurley (Fall Out Boy)
- George Hurley (Minutemen, Firehose)
- Gary Husband (John McLaughlin, Level 42)
- Zakir Hussain

== I ==
- Tris Imboden (Chicago)
- Sonny Igoe
- Inferno (Behemoth)
- It (Abruptum)
- Jack Irons (Red Hot Chili Peppers, Pearl Jam)
- Ashton Irwin (5 Seconds of Summer)
- Ipe Ivandić (Bijelo Dugme)

== J ==
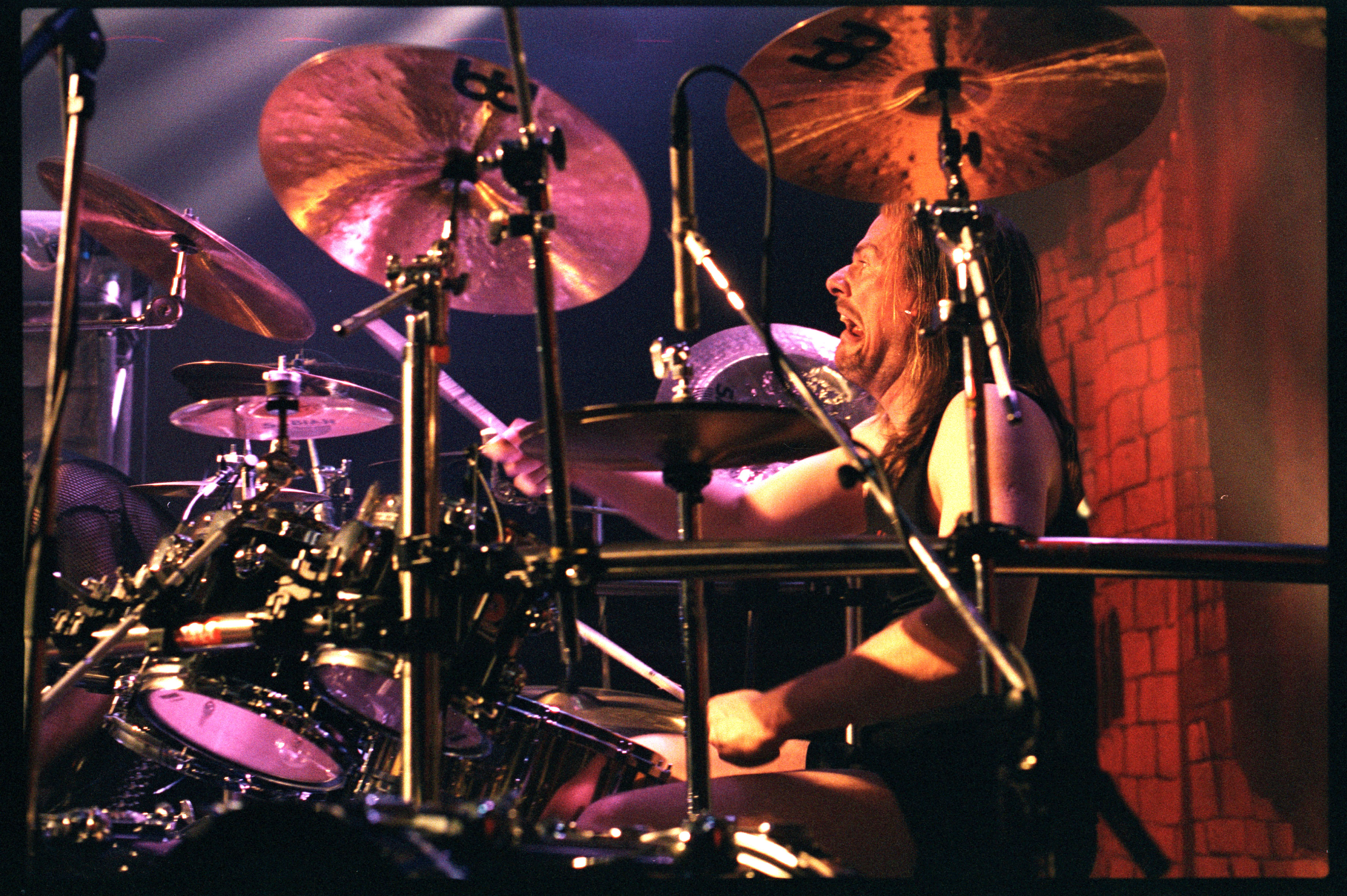
Anders Johansson

- Al Jackson Jr. (Booker T. & The M.G.'s, Otis Redding)
- Jaimoe (The Allman Brothers Band)
- Steve Jansen (Japan)
- Bobby Jarzombek, (Spastic Ink, Sebastian Bach)
- Helmut Jederknüller
- Darren Jessee (Ben Folds Five)
- Akira Jimbo
- Steve Jocz (Sum 41)
- Anders Johansson (HammerFall, Full Force, Yngwie Malmsteen, Jens Johansson), Manowar
- Matt Johnson
- Ralph Johnson (Earth, Wind, & Fire)
- Ben Johnston (Biffy Clyro)
- Nick Jonas (Jonas Brothers)
- Elvin Jones (John Coltrane)
- G. B. Jones (Fifth Column)
- Jo Jones
- Kenney Jones (Small Faces, Faces, The Who)
- Mickey Jones (The First Edition, Bob Dylan, Johnny Rivers)
- Philly Joe Jones
- Benn Jordan (The Flashbulb)
- Steve Jordan (CBS Orchestra, X-pensive Winos, Eric Clapton)
- Joey Jordison (Slipknot)
- Dave Joyal (Silent Drive)
- Harry Judd (McFly)
- Jussi 69 (the 69 Eyes)

== K ==
- Kelly Keagy (Night Ranger)
- Kami (Malice Mizer)
- Kang Min-hyuk (CNBLUE)
- Karsh Kale
- Mika "Gas Lipstick" Karppinen (HIM)
- Manu Katché
- Chris Kavanagh (Sigue Sigue Sputnik, Big Audio Dynamite II)
- Senri Kawaguchi
- John Keeble (Spandau Ballet)
- Jimmy Keegan (Santana, Kenny Loggins, Spock's Beard)
- Patrick Keeler (The Raconteurs, The Greenhornes)
- Mamady Keïta
- Nate Kelley
- Mike Kellie (Spooky Tooth, The Only Ones)
- Johnny Kelly (Type O Negative)
- Jim Keltner (Ry Cooder, George Harrison, Traveling Wilburys)
- Dave Kerman (5uu's, Present)
- Stuart Kershaw (Orchestral Manoeuvres in the Dark)
- Lee Kerslake (Uriah Heep, Ozzy Osbourne)
- Ontronik Khachaturian (System of a Down)
- Witold Kiełtyka (Decapitated)
- John Kiffmeyer (Green Day)
- Billy Kilson
- Jim Kimball (The Jesus Lizard, Firewater)
- David King (The Bad Plus)
- Sean Kinney (Alice in Chains)
- Tony Kinsey (Johnny Dankworth)
- Pete Kircher (Status Quo)
- Basil Kirchin
- Simon Kirke (Free, Bad Company)
- Ted Kirkpatrick (Tourniquet)
- Timothy Kirkpatrick (As Friends Rust, Moments in Grace)
- Frank Klepacki
- Johnny Klein
- George Kollias (Nile)
- Famoudou Konaté
- James Kottak (Kingdom Come, Scorpions)
- Joey Kramer (Aerosmith)
- Bill Kreutzmann (Grateful Dead)
- Gene Krupa
- Dave Krusen (Pearl Jam)
- Russ Kunkel (Jackson Browne, Carly Simon, James Taylor, David Crosby, Graham Nash)
- Sami Kuoppamäki (Kingston Wall, Apocalyptica)
- Uli Kusch (Masterplan, Ride the Sky, Beautiful Sin, Symfonia, Helloween, Gamma Ray, Holy Moses, Mekong Delta, Roland Grapow, Sinner)

== L ==
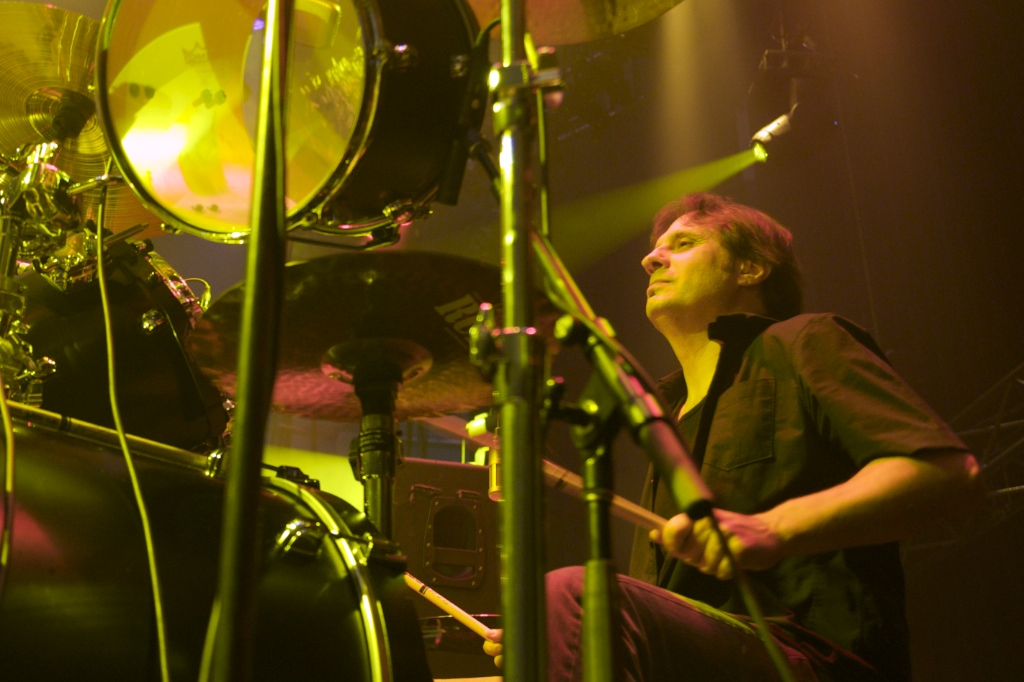
Dave Lombardo

- Abe Laboriel Jr. (Paul McCartney)
- Papa Jack Laine
- Corky Laing (Mountain, West, Bruce and Laing)
- Jay Lane (Ratdog)
- Thomas Lang
- Shannon Larkin (Godsmack, Ugly Kid Joe, Wrathchild America)
- Jon Larsen (Volbeat)
- Gilson Lavis (Squeeze)
- Bill LaVorgna
- Ricky Lawson
- Chris Layton (Double Trouble)
- Athena Lee (KrunK)
- Jon Lee (Feeder)
- Michael Lee (Little Angels, Page and Plant, The Cult)
- Tommy Lee (Rock Star Supernova, Mötley Crüe, Methods of Mayhem)
- Lucky Lehrer (Circle Jerks)
- Paul Leim
- Bob Leith (Cardiacs, Alternative TV, Blurt)
- Larry Lelli
- JB Leonor (The Dawn)
- Shannon Leto (Thirty Seconds to Mars)
- Stan Levey
- Gary Lewis (Gary Lewis & the Playboys)
- Mel Lewis
- Jaki Liebezeit (Can)
- Carlo Little (The Rolling Stones, Cyril Davies, Screaming Lord Sutch)
- Pierre van der Linden (Focus, Brainbox)
- Daniel Löble (Helloween)
- Pete Lockett
- Torstein Lofthus (Shining, Torun Eriksen, Maria Mena)
- Dave Lombardo (Slayer)
- Larrie Londin (Journey, Steve Perry)
- Derek Longmuir (Bay City Rollers)
- Martin Lopez (Soen, Opeth, Amon Amarth)
- Vini Lopez (E Street Band)
- Bill Lordan (Sly & the Family Stone, Robin Trower)
- David Lovering (Pixies)
- Bernard Lubat (Stan Getz, Claude Nougaro...)
- Ray Luzier (Korn, David Lee Roth, Army of Anyone, KXM)
- Shannon Lucas (All That Remains, The Black Dahlia Murder)
- Stan Lynch (Tom Petty and the Heartbreakers)
- Ged Lynch (Peter Gabriel)

== M ==
- John Macaluso (Starbreaker, Ark, Yngwie Malmsteen, TNT, Vitalij Kuprij, Alex Masi, Riot, Powermad, Jørn Lande, Marco Sfogli)
- Peter Magadini
- Mark Maher (Spiderbait)
- Chris Maitland (Porcupine Tree, Kino)
- Mike Malinin (Goo Goo Dolls)
- Samantha Maloney (Hole, Mötley Crüe, Eagles of Death Metal, Peaches)
- Mike Mangini (Dream Theater, Steve Vai, Annihilator, Extreme, MullMuzzler, James LaBrie, Tribe of Judah)
- Shelly Manne
- Bryan Mantia (Primus, Guns N' Roses)
- Larance Marable
- Raymund Marasigan (Eraserheads, Cambio)
- Jess Margera (CKY)
- Cory Marks
- Jerry Marotta (Peter Gabriel)
- Rick Marotta
- John Marshall
- Billy Martin (Medeski Martin & Wood)
- Chris Mars (The Replacements)
- Barrett Martin (Screaming Trees, Mad Season)
- Andrew Martinez (Nekromantix)
- J Mascis
- Harvey Mason (Herbie Hancock, Fourplay)
- Nick Mason (Pink Floyd)
- Pat Mastelotto (Mr. Mister, King Crimson)
- Ian Matthews (Kasabian)
- Dave Mattacks
- Jojo Mayer
- John Mayhew (Genesis)
- Roy Mayorga (Soulfly, Amen, Ozzy Osbourne, Stone Sour)
- Paul Mazurkiewicz (Cannibal Corpse)
- Nicko McBrain (Iron Maiden)
- Louis A. McCall Sr. (Con Funk Shun)
- Tony McCarroll (Oasis)
- Paul McCartney (The Beatles, Wings)
- Dave McClain (Machine Head)
- Andrew McCulloch (King Crimson, Fields, Greenslade)
- Linda McDonald (The Iron Maidens, Phantom Blue)
- Matthew McDonough (Mudvayne)
- Robbie McIntosh (The Average White Band)
- Jason McGerr (Death Cab For Cutie, Eureka Farm)
- Christopher McGuire
- Mac McNeilly (The Jesus Lizard, Come)
- Ed McTaggart
- Tony Meehan (The Shadows)
- Dave Mello (Operation Ivy)
- Nick Menza (Megadeth)
- Jerry Mercer (April Wine, Mashmakhan, The Wackers)
- Miroslav Milatović (Riblja Čorba, Warriors)
- Buddy Miles (Band of Gypsys)
- Butch Miles (Count Basie)
- David Milhous (Lippy's Garden)
- Russ Miller (studio drummer)
- Marco Minnemann
- Mitch Mitchell (The Jimi Hendrix Experience)
- Zigaboo Modeliste (The Meters)
- Pierre Moerlen
- Ralph Molina (Crazy Horse)
- Keith Moon (The Who)
- Gil Moore (Triumph)
- Sean Moore (Manic Street Preachers)
- Stanton Moore (Galactic)
- Airto Moreira (Hermeto Pascoal)
- Joe Morello (Dave Brubeck Quartet)
- Dindin Moreno (Parokya ni Edgar)
- Fabrizio Moretti (The Strokes)
- Charlie Morgan
- Rod Morgenstein (Winger, Dixie Dregs)
- Oscar Moro (Los Gatos, La Máquina de Hacer Pájaros, Serú Girán, Riff)
- Lee Morris (Paradise Lost, Magnum)
- Kenny Morris (Siouxsie and the Banshees)
- Stephen Morris (Joy Division, New Order)
- Lindy Morrison (The Go-Betweens)
- Ian Mosley (Marillion)
- Jon Moss (Culture Club)
- Paul Motian
- Idris Muhammad
- Larry Mullen Jr. (U2)
- Billy Murcia (New York Dolls)
- Sunny Murray
- Alan Myers (Devo)

== N ==
- Paul "P.H." Naffah (The Refreshments, Roger Clyne and The Peacemakers)
- Siddharth Nagarajan
- David Narcizo (Throwing Muses)
- Jeff Nelson (Minor Threat)
- Sandy Nelson
- Jukka Nevalainen (Nightwish, Sethian)
- Andy Newmark (Sly & the Family Stone, Roxy Music, ABC, Eric Clapton)
- Anika Nilles (independent)
- Jerry Nolan (New York Dolls, The Heartbreakers)
- Paul Noonan (Bell X1)
- Butch Norton (Eels)
- Adam Nussbaum

== O ==
- Ole "Bone W. Machine" Öhman (Dissection, Ophthalamia, Deathstars)
- Babatunde Olatunji
- Mattias Olsson (Änglagård)
- Nigel Olsson (Elton John, Uriah Heep, Plastic Penny)
- Joey Osbourne (Acid King)
- John Otto (Limp Bizkit)
- Ken Owen (Carcass)

== P ==
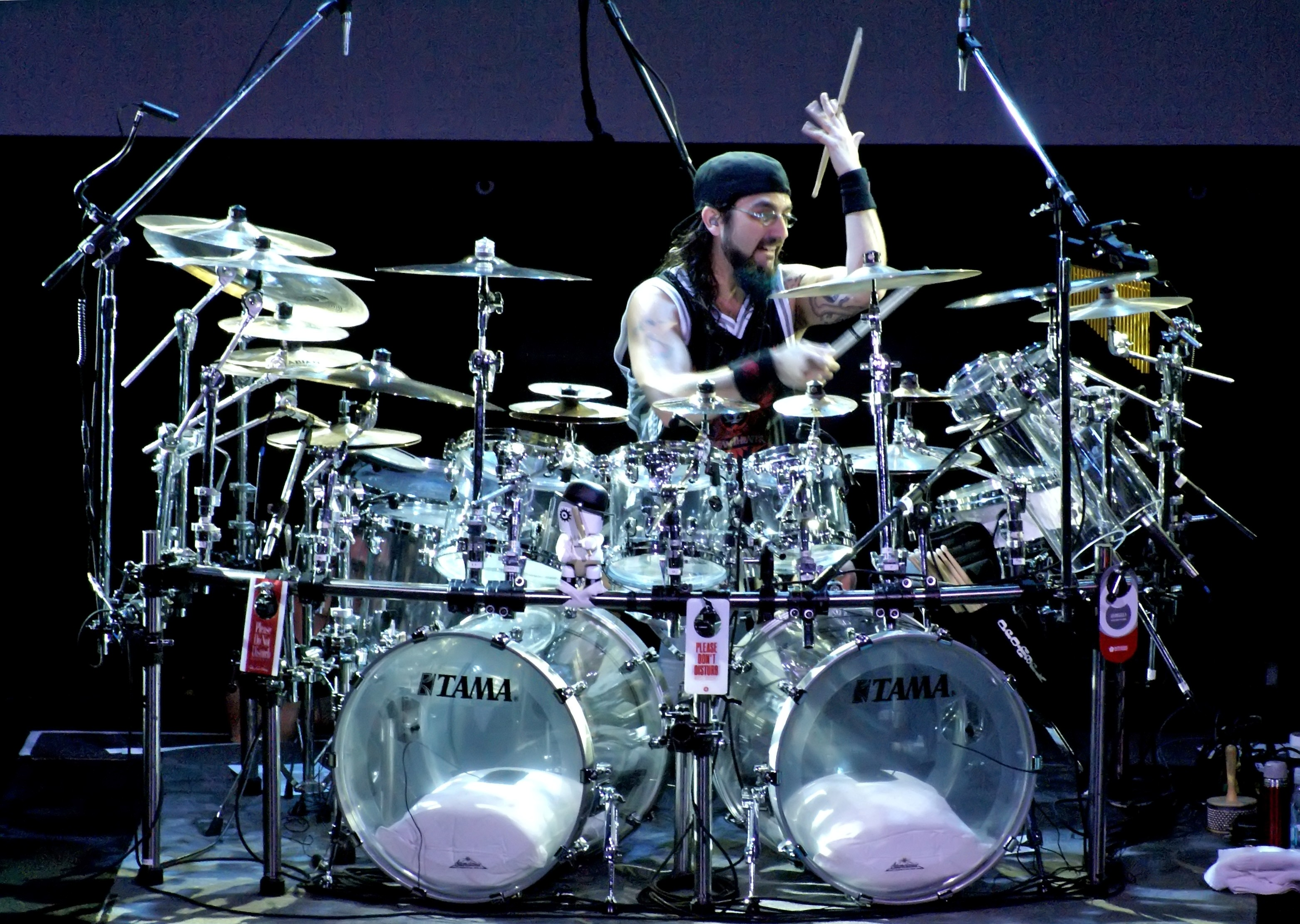
Mike Portnoy

- Ian Paice (Deep Purple, Whitesnake)
- Tony Palermo (Ten Foot Pole, Unwritten Law, Pulley, Papa Roach)
- Carl Palmer (Emerson, Lake & Palmer, Asia)
- Earl Palmer
- Panda Bear (Animal Collective)
- John Panozzo (Styx)
- Pete Parada (The Offspring, Saves the Day, Jackson United, Face to Face)
- Andrew Paresi (Morrissey, Buck's Fizz)
- Andy Parker (UFO)
- Melvin Parker (Beach Boys)
- Deantoni Parks
- John Paris (Earth, Wind & Fire)
- Jack Parnell
- Juanita Parra (Los Jaivas)
- Gene Parsons (Nashville West, The Byrds, The Flying Burrito Brothers)
- Longineu W. Parsons III (Yellowcard)
- Ted Parsons (Prong, Godflesh, Jesu)
- Sonny Payne (Count Basie)
- Neil Peart (Rush)
- D. H. Peligro (Dead Kennedys)
- Chris Pennie (Dillinger Escape Plan, Coheed and Cambria)
- Stephen Perkins (Jane's Addiction, The Panic Channel)
- A. J. Pero (Twisted Sister)
- Doane Perry (Jethro Tull)
- Dan Peters (Mudhoney, Nirvana, Bundle of Hiss, Screaming Trees)
- Darrin Pfeiffer (Goldfinger)
- Slim Jim Phantom (The Stray Cats)
- Scott Phillips (Creed, Alter Bridge)
- Simon Phillips (Toto, Judas Priest, Hiromi Uehara, Jeff Beck, Mick Jagger, The Michael Schenker Group, Protocol, The Who)
- Jason Pierce (Our Lady Peace, Paramore, Justin Bieber)
- Mark Pickerel (Screaming Trees, Truly)
- Jan Pijnenburg (Doe Maar, Lucifer, Long Tall Ernie and the Shakers)
- Florian Pilkington-Miksa (Curved Air)
- Dan Pinto
- Demetra Plakas (L7)
- Jeff Plate (Savatage, Trans-Siberian Orchestra, Metal Church)
- Eric Platz
- Daniel Platzman (Imagine Dragons)
- Derrick Plourde (Lagwagon, The Ataris, Rich Kids on LSD, Bad Astronaut)
- Mick Pointer (Marillion, Arena)
- Gerry Polci (Frankie Valli and the Four Seasons)
- Mike Portnoy (Dream Theater, Liquid Tension Experiment, Transatlantic, Avenged Sevenfold, Adrenaline Mob, The Winery Dogs, Shattered Fortress, Sons Of Apollo)
- Cozy Powell (Rainbow, Emerson, Lake and Powell, Jeff Beck Group, Whitesnake, Black Sabbath, The Brian May Band)
- Gary Powell (The Libertines, Dirty Pretty Things)
- Tim Powles (The Church)
- Jeff Porcaro (Toto)
- Steve Prestwich (Cold Chisel)
- Thomas Pridgen (The Memorials, The Mars Volta, Juliette Lewis)
- Prince
- Viv Prince (The Pretty Things)
- Zbigniew Robert Promiński (Behemoth, Witchmaster, Azarath, Artrosis)
- Bernard "Pretty" Purdie
- Maurice Purtill (Glenn Miller Orchestra)
- Artimus Pyle (Lynyrd Skynyrd)

== Q ==
- Joel Quartermain (Eskimo Joe)
- Questlove (The Roots)
- Marc Quiñones (Allman Brothers Band)

== R ==
- Krzysztof Raczkowski (Vader)
- Jaska Raatikainen (Children of Bodom)
- Alla Rakha
- Tommy Ramone (Ramones)
- Vesa Ranta (Sentenced)
- Herman Rarebell (Scorpions)
- Dave Raun (Lagwagon, Me First and the Gimme Gimmes)
- Razzle (Hanoi Rocks)
- Scott Raynor (Blink-182)
- Brett Reed (Rancid)
- Scott Reeder (Fu Manchu)
- Jurgen Reil (Kreator)
- Jim Reilly (Stiff Little Fingers)
- Sean Reinert (Cynic, Æon Spoke, Gordian Knot, Death, Aghora)
- Jonas Renkse (October Tide)
- Tony Reno (Europe)
- Walfredo Reyes Jr. (Chicago)
- Ib Riad (Alexandros)
- Buddy Rich
- Jeff Rich (Status Quo)
- Bob Richards (Man, Asia, Adrian Smith Band)
- Tony Richards (W.A.S.P.)
- Blake Richardson (Between the Buried and Me, Glass Casket)
- Bill Rieflin (Ministry, R.E.M.)
- Karriem Riggins (Diana Krall, Mulgrew Miller, Ray Brown)
- Herlin Riley
- John B. Riley
- Steve Riley (W.A.S.P., L.A. Guns)
- Bobby "Z" Rivkin (The Revolution)
- Robo (Black Flag, The Misfits)
- Max Roach
- Brad Roberts (Jizmak Da Gusha, Gwar)
- David Robinson (The Modern Lovers, The Cars)
- John "JR" Robinson
- Scott Rockenfield (Queensrÿche)
- Rikki Rockett (Poison)
- Derek Roddy (Hate Eternal, Nile, Malevolent Creation)
- Morgan Rose (Sevendust)
- Hamish Rosser (The Vines)
- Dave Rowntree (Blur, The Ailerons)
- Tony Royster Jr. (Imajin)
- Eddie Rubin (Neil Diamond, Billie Holiday, Johnny Rivers)
- Ilan Rubin (Lostprophets, Denver Harbor)
- Steve Rucker (Bee Gees)
- Phil Rudd (AC/DC)
- Jason Rullo (Symphony X)
- Todd Rundgren
- Michael Rushton (Steamhammer)
- Joe Russo (Benevento/Russo Duo)
- John Rutsey (Rush)

== S ==
- Sakura (L'Arc-en-Ciel, Zigzo, Sons of All Pussys)
- Peter Salisbury (The Verve)
- Samoth (Thou Shalt Suffer)
- Doug Sampson (Iron Maiden)
- Gar Samuelson (Megadeth)
- Bobby Sanabria
- Antonio Sanchez (Pat Metheny Group)
- Neil Sanderson (Three Days Grace)
- Erik Sandin (NOFX)
- Pete Sandoval (Morbid Angel)
- Rat Scabies (The Damned)
- Bobby Schayer (Bad Religion)
- Kate Schellenbach (Beastie Boys, Luscious Jackson)
- Christoph Schneider (Rammstein)
- Gina Schock (The Go-Go's)
- Allan Schwartzberg (Mountain, The Group with No Name)
- Jon "Bermuda" Schwartz ("Weird Al" Yankovic)
- Jason Schwartzman (Phantom Planet)
- Stefan Schwarzmann (Accept, U.D.O., Running Wild, X-Wild, Krokus, Helloween)
- Ingo Schwichtenberg (Helloween)
- Andrew Scott (Sloan)
- Bon Scott (The Spektors)
- Kliph Scurlock (The Flaming Lips)
- Ryan Seaman (Falling In Reverse, The Bigger Lights, I Am Ghost)
- Phil Seamen (Jack Parnell, Joe Harriott, Ronnie Scott, Tubby Hayes, Big Bill Broonzy)
- Philip Selway (Radiohead)
- Danny Seraphine (Chicago)
- Gabe Serbian (The Locust)
- Shagrath (Dimmu Borgir)
- Patty Schemel (Hole, Juliette Lewis)
- Chris Sharrock (The La's, Oasis)
- Snowy Shaw (King Diamond, Memento Mori, Mercyful Fate, Dream Evil, Kee Marcello's K2, Ralf Scheepers, Nightrage, Sabaton)
- Ed Shaughnessy (Doc Severinsen, The Tonight Show Starring Johnny Carson)
- Steve Shelley (Sonic Youth)
- Seb Shelton (Dexys Midnight Runners)
- Jerry Shirley (Humble Pie, Fastway)
- Michael Shrieve (Santana)
- Rick Shutter
- Bob Siebenberg (Supertramp)
- David Silveria (KoRn)
- John Silver (Genesis)
- Eric Singer (Kiss, Alice Cooper, Black Sabbath, Brian May)
- Jeff Singer (Paradise Lost)
- Zutty Singleton
- Joe Sirois (The Mighty Mighty Bosstones, Street Dogs)
- Drums Sivamani
- Martin "Marthus" Škaroupka (Cradle of Filth)
- Chris Slade (AC/DC, The Firm, Manfred Mann's Earth Band, Asia, Uriah Heep)
- Marc Slutsky (Splender, Peter Murphy, Bauhaus)
- Chad Smith (Red Hot Chili Peppers, Glenn Hughes, Chikenfoot, Joe Satriani)
- Marvin Smith (The Tonight Show with Jay Leno)
- Marvin "Bugalu" Smith (The Sun Ra Arkestra)
- Mike Smith (Suffocation)
- Mike “Smitty” Smith (Paul Revere & the Raiders)
- Nate Smith (Vulfpeck)
- Neal Smith (Alice Cooper)
- Steve Smith (Journey, Vital Information)
- Spencer Smith (Panic! at the Disco)
- Travis Smith (Trivium)
- Ty Smith (Bullets and Octane, Guttermouth)
- Willie "Big Eyes" Smith (Muddy Waters)
- Aaron Solowoniuk (Billy Talent)
- Yoyoka Soma (Kaneaiyoyoka)
- Matt Sorum (The Cult, Guns N' Roses, Velvet Revolver)
- Jerry Speiser (Men at Work, Frost)
- Henry Spinetti (Eric Clapton, Pete Townshend, Paul McCartney)
- Squarepusher
- John Stanier (Helmet, Battles, Tomahawk)
- Zak Starkey (The Who, Oasis)
- Jabo Starks (James Brown)
- Ringo Starr (The Beatles)
- Thomen Stauch (Blind Guardian, Savage Circus)
- John Steel (The Animals)
- Shaun Steels (Anathema)
- Branden Steineckert (The Used, Rancid)
- Jody Stephens (Big Star)
- Ronnie Stephenson
- Bill Stevenson (Descendents, Black Flag)
- Bill Stewart
- Tommy Stewart (Godsmack, Lo-Pro)
- Harry Stinson (Marty Stuart)
- Andy Strachan (Living End)
- Jesper Strömblad (In Flames)
- Claudio Strunz (Hermética)
- Clyde Stubblefield (James Brown)
- Andy Sturmer (Jellyfish, Beatnik Beatch)
- Richard Stuverud (Fastbacks, War Babies, Three Fish, RNDM)
- Todd Sucherman (Styx)
- James Owen Sullivan (A.K.A. "The Rev") (Avenged Sevenfold, Pinkly Smooth)
- Dave Suzuki (Vital Remains)
- Daniel Svensson (In Flames)
- Dan Swanö (Bloodbath, Edge of Sanity, Nightingale, Ribspreader, Sörskogen)
- Robert Sweet (Stryper)
- Chad Szeliga (Breaking Benjamin, Black Label Society, Black Star Riders)

== T ==
- Peter Tagg (Cardiacs, The Trudy)
- Jeremy Taggart (Our Lady Peace)
- Kevin Talley (Chimaira, Daath, Misery Index)
- Christian Tanna (I Mother Earth)
- Michael Tapper (We Are Scientists)
- Grady Tate
- Yoshida Tatsuya (Ruins)
- Dallas Taylor (Crosby, Stills and Nash, Manassas, Van Morrison)
- Mel Taylor (The Ventures)
- Phil Taylor (Motörhead)
- Roger Taylor (Duran Duran)
- Roger Taylor (Smile, Queen, Queen + Paul Rodgers)
- Dolphin Taylor (Stiff Little Fingers, Tom Robinson Band)
- Joel Taylor
- Ted (Dead Kennedys)
- John Tempesta (Testament, White Zombie, Helmet)
- Mike Terrana (Masterplan)
- Jon Theodore (The Mars Volta, Queens of the Stone Age)
- Alex Thomas
- Pete Thomas (The Attractions)
- Chester Thompson (Frank Zappa, Weather Report, Genesis, Phil Collins)
- Paul Thompson (Roxy Music)
- Paul Thomson (Franz Ferdinand)
- Tony Thompson (Chic)
- Thunderstick (Paul Samson)
- Tjodalv (Old Man's Child, Dimmu Borgir, Susperia, Gromth)
- Brian Tichy (Billy Idol)
- Srđan Todorović (Ekatarina Velika)
- Lol Tolhurst (The Cure)
- Tico Torres (Bon Jovi)
- Trym Torson (Emperor)
- Stuart Tosh (Pilot, The Alan Parsons Project)
- Rob Townsend (Family)
- Rachel Trachtenburg (Trachtenburg Family Slideshow Players)
- Todd Trainer (Shellac)
- Gene Trautmann (Eagles of Death Metal, Queens of the Stone Age, The Miracle Workers)
- Scott Travis (Judas Priest, Racer X)
- Art Tripp (The Mothers of Invention, Frank Zappa, Captain Beefheart)
- Butch Trucks (The Allman Brothers Band)
- Moe Tucker (The Velvet Underground)
- Mick Tucker (The Sweet)
- Nick Turner
- George Tutuska (Goo Goo Dolls, Jackdaw)
- Twink (The Pretty Things, Pink Fairies)

== U ==
- Lars Ulrich (Metallica, Merciful Fate)
- David Uosikkinen (The Hooters)

== V ==
- Tobi Vail (Bikini Kill)
- Ville Valo
- Christian Vander (Magma)
- Alex Van Halen (Van Halen)
- Peter Van Hooke (Mike + The Mechanics)
- Ronnie Vannucci Jr. (The Killers)
- David Van Tieghem
- Eduardo Vázquez (Callejeros)
- Dirk Verbeuren (Soilwork, Scarve, Megadeth)
- Butch Vig (Garbage)
- Brian Viglione (The Dresden Dolls)
- Paulina Villarreal (The Warning)
- Nick Vincent
- Ivan Voshchyna (Pikkardiyska Tertsia)
- Chris Vrenna (Nine Inch Nails, Tweaker)

== W ==
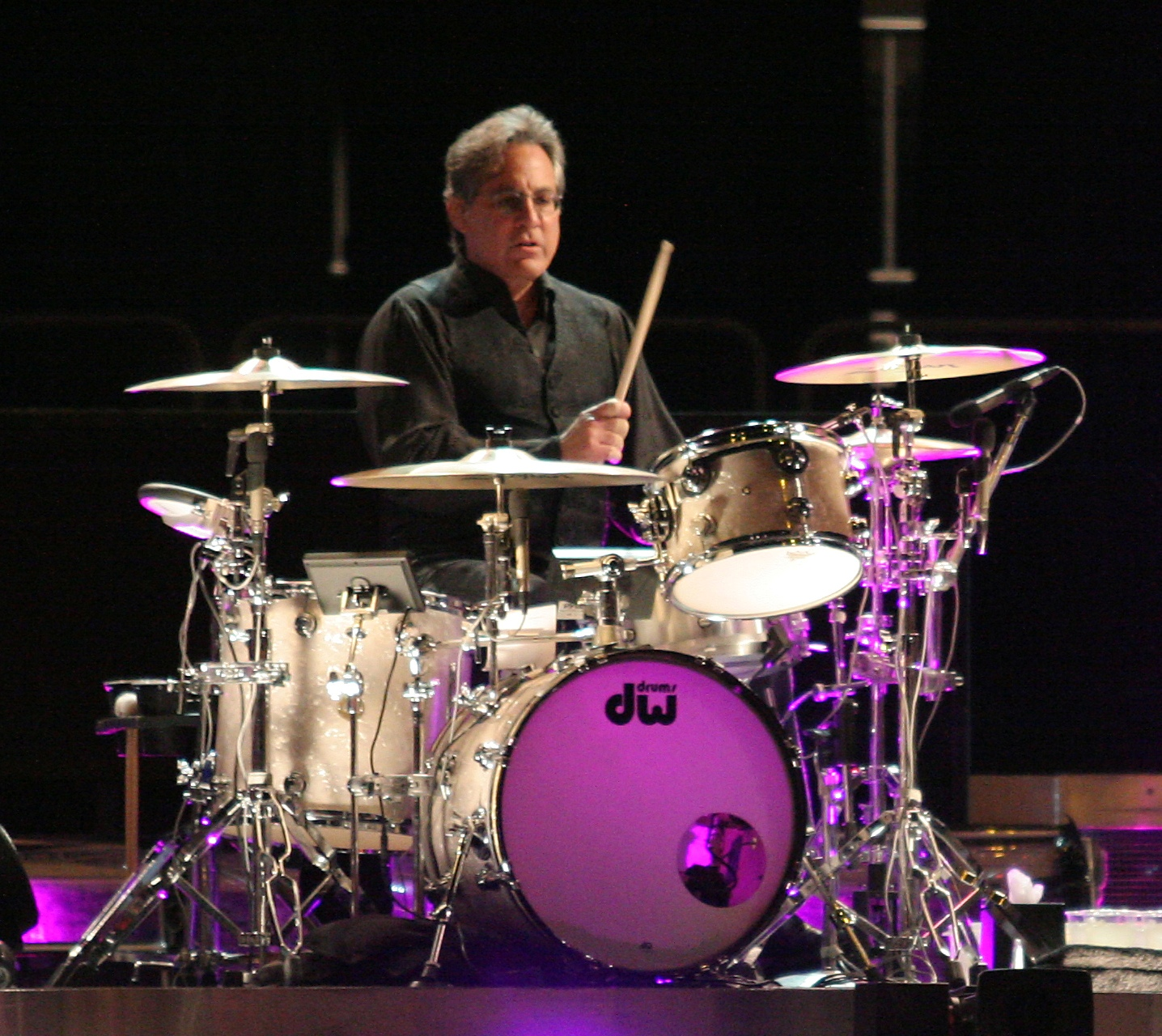
Max Weinberg

- Brooks Wackerman (Avenged Sevenfold, Suicidal Tendencies, Bad Religion)
- Chad Wackerman
- Narada Michael Walden (Jeff Beck, Journey)
- Jimmy Walker
- Matt Walker (Filter, The Smashing Pumpkins)
- Gary Wallis (Pink Floyd)
- Ed Warby (Gorefest)
- Andy Ward (Camel)
- Bill Ward (Black Sabbath)
- John Ware (Emmylou Harris)
- Joey Waronker (Beck, The Smashing Pumpkins, Elliott Smith, R.E.M.)
- Rey Washam (Scratch Acid, Rapeman, Ministry)
- Kenny Washington
- Charlie Watts (The Rolling Stones)
- Jeff "Tain" Watts
- John Weathers (Gentle Giant)
- Leroy Wallace (Inner Circle, Gregory Isaacs)
- Louie Weaver (Petra)
- Chick Webb
- Dave Weckl
- Jay Weinberg (Slipknot)
- Max Weinberg (E Street Band, The Max Weinberg 7, Bruce Springsteen)
- Janet Weiss (Sleater-Kinney, Quasi)
- Ron Welty (The Offspring, Steady Ground)
- Mike Wengren (Disturbed)
- Paul Wertico (Pat Metheny)
- Sandy West (The Runaways)
- Alan White (Oasis)
- Alan White (Plastic Ono Band, Yes)
- Andy White
- Jack White
- Jim White (Dirty Three)
- Lenny White
- Maurice White (Ramsey Lewis, Earth, Wind, & Fire)
- Meg White (The White Stripes)
- Steve White (Paul Weller)
- Alan Wilder (Depeche Mode)
- Peter Wildoer (Darkane, Old Man's Child, James LaBrie, Arch Enemy, Armageddon, Time Requiem, Pestilence)
- Brad Wilk (Rage Against the Machine, Audioslave)
- Adam "Atom" Willard (The Offspring, Angels & Airwaves, The Special Goodness)
- Boris Williams (The Cure)
- Hank Williams III
- Johnny Williams (Raymond Scott)
- Pharrell Williams (The Neptunes, N*E*R*D)
- Steve Williams
- Terry Williams (Love Sculpture, Man, Rockpile, Neverland Express, Dire Straits)
- Tony Williams
- Van Williams (Nevermore)
- B. J. Wilson (Procol Harum)
- Dennis Wilson (The Beach Boys)
- Patrick "Pat" Wilson (Weezer)
- Ron Wilson (Surfaris)
- Shadow Wilson
- Pick Withers (Dire Straits)
- Alex Wolff (Nat and Alex Wolff)
- Stevie Wonder
- Dan Woodgate (Madness, Voice of the Beehive)
- Mick Woodmansey (David Bowie's Spiders from Mars)
- Sam Woodyard (Duke Ellington)
- Alan Wren (The Stone Roses)
- Simon Wright (AC/DC, Dio)
- Jon Wurster
- Robert Wyatt (Soft Machine, Matching Mole, Kevin Ayers, Henry Cow, Brian Eno, David Gilmour)
- Thomas Wydler (Nick Cave & The Bad Seeds, Die Haut)
- Howard Wyeth

== Y ==
- Shinya Yamada (Luna Sea)
- Tim Yeung (Divine Heresy, Hate Eternal, Vital Remains)
- Yip Sai Wing (Beyond)
- Melissa York (Team Dresch, The Butchies)
- Pete York (The Spencer Davis Group, Jon Lord)
- Adrian Young (No Doubt)
- Brian Young (Fountains of Wayne, The Jesus and Mary Chain)
- Yoshiki (X Japan)
- Yukihiro (L'Arc-en-Ciel)

== Z ==
- Nir Zidkyahu (Genesis, Ray Wilson)
- Dan Zimmermann (Gamma Ray)
- Jay Ziskrout (Bad Religion)
- Zoro (Lenny Kravitz)
- Cesar Zuiderwijk (Golden Earring)

== See also ==
- List of electronic drum performers
- List of female drummers
- List of heavy metal drummers
- List of jazz drummers
- List of percussionists
