= List of heavy metal drummers =

This is a list of heavy metal drummers.

== A ==
- Sal Abruscato (Life of Agony, Type O Negative)
- Chris Adler (Lamb of God)
- Steven Adler (Guns N' Roses, Adler's Appetite)
- Tommy Aldridge (Black Oak Arkansas, Whitesnake)
- Tim Alexander (Primus)
- Rick Allen (Def Leppard)
- Bill Andrews (Death, Massacre)
- Seven Antonopoulos (Leaves' Eyes, Atrocity)
- Carmine Appice (Beck, Bogert & Appice, Cactus, King Kobra)
- Vinny Appice (Dio, Black Sabbath, Heaven & Hell)
- Steve Asheim (Deicide)
- Nick Augusto (Trivium)

== B ==
- Laurens Bakker (Picture)
- Frankie Banali (Quiet Riot, W.A.S.P.)
- Brandon Barnes (Rise Against)
- Angel Bartolotta (Genitorturers, Dope)
- Roger J. Beaujard (Mortician)
- Chuck Behler (Megadeth)
- Charlie Benante (Anthrax, Stormtroopers of Death)
- Noah Bernardo (P.O.D.)
- Bobby Blotzer (Ratt, Contraband)
- Jan Axel Blomberg (Mayhem)
- Mike Bordin (Faith No More, Ozzy Osbourne)
- Jamie Borger (Talisman, Treat)
- Paul Bostaph (Slayer, Testament)
- Stef Broks (Exivious, Textures)
- Mike Browning (Morbid Angel)
- Dirk Bruinenberg (Elegy, Adagio)
- Ronald Bruner Jr. (Suicidal Tendencies, The Temptations)
- Clive Burr (Iron Maiden)
- Ivan Busic (Dr. Sin, Ultraje a Rigor, Eduardo Araújo)

== C ==
- Will Calhoun (Living Colour)
- Danny Carey (Tool)
- Eric Carr (Kiss)
- Michael Cartellone (Accept, Damn Yankees)
- Randy Castillo (Mötley Crüe, Ozzy Osbourne)
- Deen Castronovo (Ozzy Osbourne, Black Sabbath, Steve Vai, Hardline)
- Igor Cavalera (Sepultura, Cavalera Conspiracy)
- Jim Chaffin (The Crucified, Deliverance)
- Dave Chavarri (Ill Niño, Soulfly)
- Jonny Chops (Wednesday 13, Trashlight Vision, Anti-Product)
- Richard Christy (Charred Walls of the Damned, Death, Iced Earth)
- Louie Clemente (Testament)
- Tommy Clufetos (Ozzy Osbourne, John 5)
- Scott Columbus (Manowar)
- Ricardo Confessori (Angra)
- John Connolly (Pierce Dogs, Sevendust)
- Fred Coury (Cinderella)
- Shawn Crahan (Slipknot)
- Peter Criss (Kiss)
- Dave Culross (Malevolent Creation, Suffocation, Incantation)

== D ==
- Greg D'Angelo (White Lion, Greg Leon Invasion)
- Brann Dailor (Mastodon)
- Adrienne Davies (Earth)
- Bevan Davies (MonstrO)
- Daniel Davison (Underoath, Norma Jean)
- Ivan de Prume (White Zombie)
- Mikkey Dee (King Diamond, Motörhead, Scorpions)
- Jimmy DeGrasso (Alice Cooper, F5)
- Jean Dolabella (Sepultura, Paul Di'Anno)
- John Dolmayan (System of a Down)
- Gary Driscoll (Rainbow)
- Shawn Drover (Megadeth)
- Aynsley Dunbar (Whitesnake, UFO)
- Mario Duplantier (Gojira, Empalot)

== E ==
- Lester Estelle II (Pillar)
- Daniel Erlandsson (Arch Enemy)
- Michael Eurich (Warlock)

== F ==
- Chris Fehn (Slipknot)
- Steve Felton (Mushroomhead)
- Frank Ferrer (Tool, Guns N' Roses)
- Ginger Fish (Marilyn Manson)
- Justin Foley (Killswitch Engage, Blood Has Been Shed)
- Brian James Fox (White Tiger, Silent Rage)

== G ==
- Greg Gall (Six Feet Under)
- Lance Garvin (Living Sacrifice, Soul Embraced)
- Jerry Gaskill (King's X)
- Pete Gill (Motörhead, Saxon)
- Aaron Gillespie (Underoath)
- Nigel Glockler (Saxon)
- Rocky Gray (Evanescence, Living Sacrifice, Soul Embraced)
- Matt Greiner (August Burns Red)

== H ==
- Tomas Haake (Meshuggah)
- Kai Hahto (Nightwish, Wintersun)
- Chris Hakius (Sleep)
- Dave Haley (Psycroptic)
- Donnie Hamzik (Manowar)
- Andrew Haug (Contrive)
- Ian Haugland (Europe)
- Leonard Haze (Y&T)
- Raymond Herrera (Fear Factory)
- Munetaka Higuchi (Loudness)
- Gene Hoglan (Fear Factory, Death, Testament, Dark Angel, Dethklok)
- Eldon Hoke (The Mentors, The Screamers
- Larry Howe (Vicious Rumors- Chastain)
- Dave Holland (Judas Priest)
- Gary Holland
- Luke Holland (The Word Alive)
- Steve Hughes (Nazxul)
- Will Hunt (Evanescence, Black Label Society)
- Tom Hunting (Exodus, Angel Witch)
- David Husvik (Extol)

== I ==
- Jorge Iacobellis (Hirax)
- Inferno (Behemoth)

== J ==
- Bobby Jarzombek (Riot)
- Per Möller Jensen (The Haunted, Nightrage)
- Anders Johansson (Yngwie J. Malmsteen's Rising Force, HammerFall, Tungsten (band))
- Dan Johnson (Back From Ashes, Brian "Head" Welch, Love and Death, Red, The Sammus Theory)
- Joey Jordison (Slipknot)

== K ==
- Stefan Kaufmann (Accept, U.D.O.)
- Johnny Kelly (Danzig, Type O Negative)
- Des Kensel (High on Fire)
- Derek Kerswill (Kingdom of Sorrow)
- Ontronik Khachaturian (System of a Down, KillMatriarch)
- Reno Kiilerich (Dimmu Borgir, Old Man's Child)
- David Kinkade (Borknagar)
- Sean Kinney (Alice in Chains)
- Ted Kirkpatrick (Tourniquet)
- Ben Koller (Converge, Killer Be Killed)
- George Kollias (Nile)
- Chris Kontos (Machine Head, Testament, Attitude Adjustment)
- Jim Korthe (Phantasm, 3rd Strike)
- James Kottak (Kingdom Come, Warrant, Scorpions)
- Josh Kulick (Through the Eyes of the Dead)

== L ==
- Michel Langevin (Voivod)
- Shannon Larkin (Godsmack)
- Tony Laureano (God Dethroned, Angelcorpse)
- Jen Ledger (Skillet)
- Kam Lee (Massacre, Death)
- Tommy Lee (Mötley Crüe, Methods of Mayhem)
- Dennis Leeflang (Bumblefoot)
- Joe Letz (Combichrist)
- Dave Lombardo (Slayer)
- Sara Lee Lucas (Marilyn Manson)
- Shannon Lucas (Black Dahlia Murder, All That Remains)
- Ray Luzier (Korn)

== M ==
- Samantha Maloney (Mötley Crüe)
- Jordan Mancino (As I Lay Dying, Wovenwar)
- Mike Mangini (Dream Theater, Steve Vai, Annihilator, Extreme)
- Bryan Mantia (Godflesh, Guns N' Roses, Buckethead)
- Emilio Márquez (Possessed)
- Roy Mayorga (Stone Sour)
- Paul Mazurkiewicz (Cannibal Corpse)
- Nicko McBrain (Iron Maiden)
- Dave McClain (Machine Head)
- Linda McDonald (Phantom Blue, The Iron Maidens)
- Nick Menza (Megadeth, Marty Friedman)
- Davy Mickers (Stream of Passion)
- Joe Musten (Beloved, Advent)

== N ==
- Craig Nunenmacher (Crowbar, Black Label Society)
- Jukka Nevalainen (Nightwish)

== O ==
- Shane Ochsner
- Phil Ondich (Black Label Society, Raging Slab)
- Nick Oshiro (Static-X, Seether)
- John Otto (Limp Bizkit)

== P ==
- Ian Paice (Deep Purple, Whitesnake)
- Tony Palermo (Papa Roach)
- Andy Parker (UFO)
- Vinnie Paul (Pantera, Hellyeah)
- Neil Peart (Rush)
- Chris Pennie (Coheed & Cambria, The Dillinger Escape Plan)
- Stephen Perkins (Jane’s Addiction, Porno For Pyros)
- A. J. Pero (Twisted Sister)
- Roxy Petrucci (Madam X, Vixen)
- Scott Phillips (Alter Bridge, Creed)
- Simon Phillips (Judas Priest, Michael Schenker Group)
- Pinchface (Deli Creeps)
- Mike Portnoy (Dream Theater, Avenged Sevenfold)
- Cozy Powell (Rainbow, Michael Schenker Group, Whitesnake, Black Sabbath)
- Aquiles Priester (Angra, Hangar)
- Matt Putman (Living Sacrifice, Eso-Charis)

== R ==
- Herman Rarebell (Scorpions)
- Chris Reifert (Abscess, Death, Autopsy)
- Sean Reinert (Cynic)
- The Rev (Avenged Sevenfold)
- Blake Richardson (Between the Buried and Me)
- Joe Rickard (Red, In Flames)
- Scott Rockenfield (Queensrÿche)
- Derek Roddy (Hate Eternal, Nile)
- Alexei Rodriguez (3 Inches of Blood, Walls of Jericho)
- Bobby Rondinelli (Blue Öyster Cult, Rainbow)
- Morgan Rose (Sevendust)
- Aaron Rossi (Prong, Ministry)
- Ilan Rubin (Nine Inch Nails, Lostprophets)
- Phil Rudd (AC/DC)
- Jason Rullo (Symphony X)

== S ==
- Gar Samuelson (Megadeth)
- Matt "Skitz" Sanders (Terrorust)
- Neil Sanderson (Thousand Foot Krutch, Three Days Grace)
- Pete Sandoval (Morbid Angel)
- Christoph Schneider (Rammstein)
- Stefan Schwarzmann (Krokus, Accept)
- Seann Scott (Hellion)
- Shagrath (Dimmu Borgir)
- Jayson Sherlock (Horde, Mortification)
- Martin Marthus Škaroupka (Cradle of Filth)
- David Silveria (Korn)
- Eric Singer (Kiss, Black Sabbath)
- Chris Slade (AC/DC, Uriah Heep)
- Jesse Smith (Zao)
- Mike Smith (Suffocation)
- Travis Smith (Trivium)
- Matt Sorum (Velvet Revolver, Guns N' Roses)
- Jesse Sprinkle (Poor Old Lu, Demon Hunter)
- Jani Stefanovic (Renascent, Crimson Moonlight, Miseration)
- Barry Stern (Trouble, Zoetrope)
- Jimmy “The Rev” Sullivan (Avenged Sevenfold)
- Darrell Sweet (Nazareth)
- Robert Sweet (Stryper)
- Steven Sweet (Warrant, Plain Jane)
- Chad Szeliga (OurAfter, Breaking Benjamin)

== T ==
- Kevin Talley (Dååth, Six Feet Under, Dying Fetus)
- Donald Tardy (Andrew W.K., Obituary)
- Phil Taylor (Motörhead)
- John Tempesta (Exodus, Testament, White Zombie)
- Mike Terrana (Masterplan, Tarja Turunen)
- Brian Tichy (Foreigner, Whitesnake, Ozzy Osbourne)
- Themis Tolis (Rotting Christ)
- Scott Travis (Judas Priest)
- Matt Traynor (Blessthefall)

== U ==
- Lars Ulrich (Metallica)
- Jan Uvena (Iron Butterfly, Alice Cooper, Alcatrazz)

== V ==
- Stephen van Haestregt (Within Temptation, My Favorite Scar)
- Alex Van Halen (Van Halen)
- Matt Vander Ende (Defiance)
- Dirk Verbeuren (Soilwork, Scarve)
- Chris Vrenna (Marilyn Manson, Nine Inch Nails)

== W ==
- Britt Walford (Squirrel Bait)
- Ed Warby (Ayreon, Gorefest)
- Bill Ward (Black Sabbath)
- Ariën van Weesenbeek (Epica, God Dethroned)
- Gary Wehrkamp (Shadow Gallery, Ayreon)
- Mike Wengren (Disturbed)
- Steve West (Danger Danger)
- Brad Wilk (Rage Against the Machine, Audioslave)
- Victor Ray Wilson (Body Count)
- Simon Wright (AC/DC, Dio, UFO)
- Jay Weinberg (Slipknot)

== Y ==
- Tim Yatras (Lord)
- Tim Yeung (All That Remains, Hate Eternal, Morbid Angel, Vital Remains)

== Z ==
- Stix Zadinia (Steel Panther)
- Steve Zing (Mourning Noise, Samhain)
- Mark Zonder (Warlord)
