= Lochlan Watt =

Australian music personality (born 1987)

- Born: 1987 (age 38–39)
- Occupations: Radio host, musician, promoter

Lochlan Watt (born 1987) is an Australian radio announcer, journalist, record label owner and musician from Brisbane, Queensland. He is currently based in Melbourne.

== Career ==
He has hosted Triple J's heavy music show The Racket from February 2012 to December 2024. Watt has performed primarily as a vocalist in such groups as Colossvs, Nuclear Summer, Psycroptic, Thy Art is Murder, and current project RUN. Watt filled in for vocals with Thy Art Is Murder on their Coffin Dragger tour.
