= Contrive =

Australian metal band

- Origin: Melbourne, Victoria, Australia
- Genres: Groove metal, metalcore
- Years active: 1999–present
- Members: Andrew Haug; Paul Haug; Tim Stahlmann

Contrive are an Australian heavy metal band from Melbourne, formed in 1999. Their musical style has been compared to that of Sepultura. The band consists of bassist Tim Stahlmann and twin brothers Paul Haug (vocals, guitars) and Andrew Haug (drums). Andrew Haug is perhaps better known from his history as the host of the weekly Triple J metal radio program The Racket between 2002 and late 2011.

== History ==
The band's first studio album, The Meaning Unseen, was released in September 2005. It was mixed by Fredrik Nordström. It received favourable reviews highlighting the combined elements of stomping modern hardcore, '80s thrash and old-time heavy metal.

Their second album, The Internal Dialogue, was recorded in Melbourne with producer Adam Calaitzis and mixed by Devin Townsend.

The band have performed extensively since their inception and include three performances at the (now defunct) Metal for the Brain festival as well as opening slots for overseas bands which include Sepultura, Riverside, Mayhem, Machine Head, Destruction, Devin Townsend, Opeth and Testament. In 2009, they toured South East Asia, including a show in Singapore with Parkway Drive. During 2011, the band toured Vietnam and were the first Australian metal band to do so.

The band have been inactive since c. 2019. Their last known performance was as a support to Voivod's Melbourne show in January 2019.

== Discography ==
=== Studio albums ===
- The Meaning Unseen (2005)
- The Internal Dialogue (2010)
- Slow Dissolve (2017)

=== EPs ===
- Finally (self-released, 2001)
- Prosper (self-released, 2003)
