= Eric Platz =

American drummer

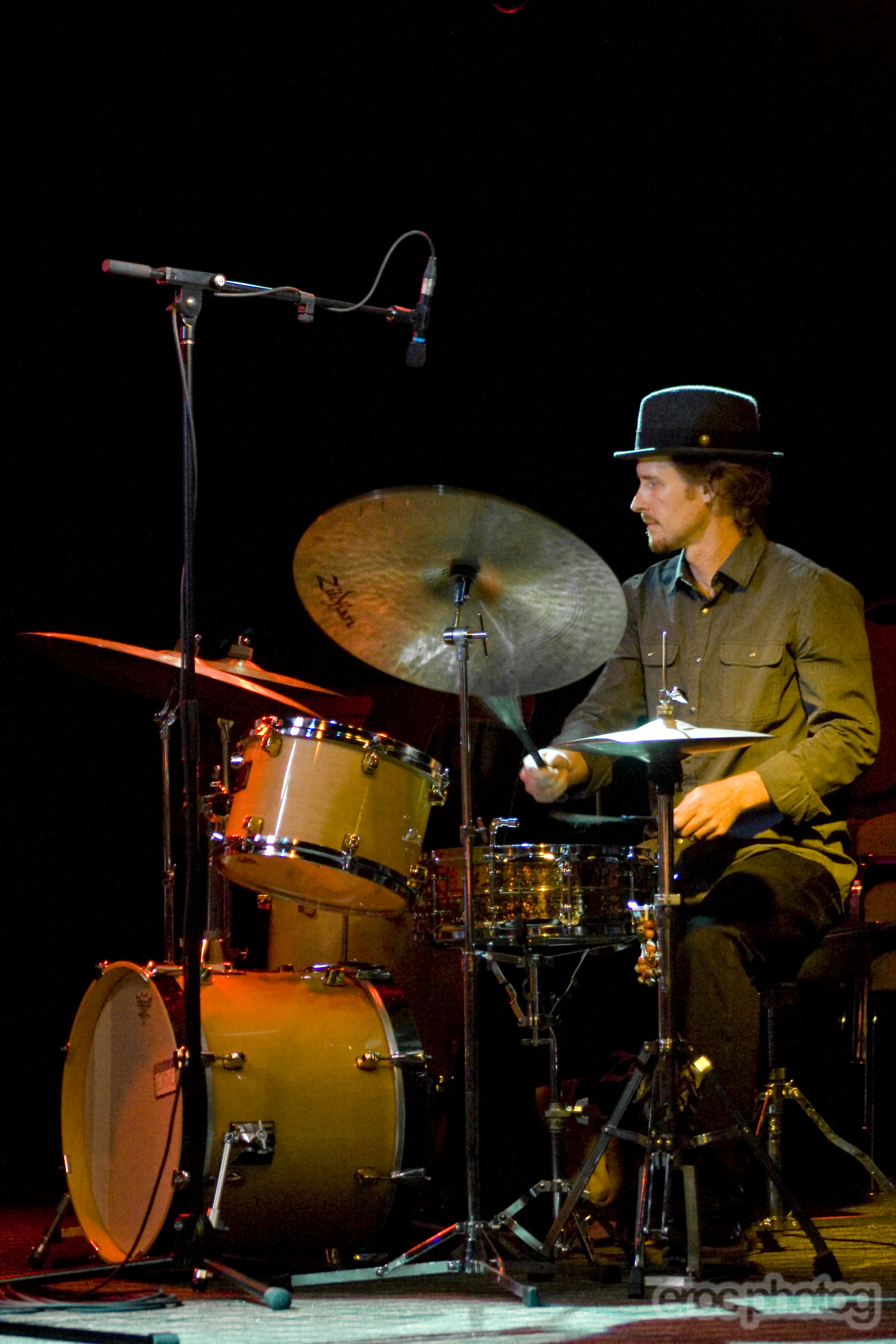

Background information
- Born: Eric Stephen Platz; March 3, 1973 (age 53); Cumberland, Maryland, United States
- Origin: Boston, Massuchesetts
- Genres: Jazz/Improvisational, rock, alt-country, classical, Afro-Cuban, Brazilian, North African
- Occupations: Drummer, percussionist, educator
- Labels: EMI (Blue Note Record Group), Ninth Street Opus, Signature Sounds, Compass Records, Independent
- Formerly of: Asefa
- Website: ericplatz.com

Eric Stephen Platz (born March 3, 1973) is a drummer, percussionist, and educator.

Since the late 1990s, Platz has maintained an active performing career across North America, touring with artists of many different backgrounds. Platz performs in many styles and genres including, but not limited to: jazz, Americana, world music, rock, and classical. Among other ensembles, Platz is currently a member of Brooklyn-based singer-songwriter Carrie Rodriguez's band, as well as world music ensemble Asefa. In addition to many tours and radio appearances with Rodriguez's band, Platz has had a number of television appearances, including an appearance on PBS's Austin City Limits. A number of his bands have been praised in The New York Times, The Boston Globe, Time Out, and the Village Voice.

Throughout the course of his career, Platz has co-led two improvised music trios, FourMinusOne and Fat Little Bastard.

Over the course of his career, Platz has played with Lucinda Williams, Bill Frisell, Joe Lovano, John Mark Baron, Josh Winestock, Greg Gatien and Michael Cain, among many others.

Platz holds an MMus in Jazz Performance from the New England Conservatory and an ScB degree in Materials Science from Brown University.

Currently residing in Brandon, Manitoba, Canada, Platz is an assistant professor at Brandon University where he teaches applied drumset and jazz ensembles, among other jazz studies and world music courses. Eric is an endorsing artist for Vic Firth Drumsticks.

== Selected discography ==
- Richard Gillis/Bjorn Thoroddsen: Morgana’s Revenge (Independent Release, 2012)
- Asefa: Resonance (Bended Ear Records, Brooklyn, NY, 2011)
- Carrie Rodriguez: Love and Circumstance (Ninth Street Opus, Berkeley, CA, 2010)
- Carrie Rodriguez: She Ain’t Me (EMI/Blue Note Record Group, NY, NY, 2008)
- Mark Erelli: Delivered (Signature Sounds, Whately, MA, 2008)
- Rachael Davis: Antebellum Queens (Fox on a Hill Records, Petosky, MI, 2008)
- Jenny Goodspeed: Under The Ash Tree (Independent Release, Ashfield, MA, 2008)
- Adrienne Young: Room To Grow (RykoDisc/AddieBelle Records, Nashville, TN, 2007)
- Joe Parillo Trio with Jay Hoggard: Segments (Neoga Records, North Kingston, RI, 2007)
- Heather and the Barbarians: Tell Me Tonight (Independent Release, Brooklyn, NY, 2007)
- Andreea Pauta: Autumn (Independent Release, Boston, MA, 2007)
- Jake Armerding: Walking on the World (Compass Records, Nashville, TN, 2007)
- Laura Cortese: Even The Lost Creek (Independent Release, Boston, MA, 2006)
- Carrie Cheron: One More Autumn (Riparius Records, Charlottlesville, VA, 2006)
- Fat Little Bastard: Idiosyncphony (Independent Release, Boston, MA, 2005)
- Jeremiah McLane: Freetown (Floating Bridge Music, Sharon, VT, 2005)
- Asefa: Asefa (Bended Ear, Brooklyn, NY, 2005)
- Ro’I Raz: Between The Suns (Sachimay Records, Easton, PA, 2003)
- Fat Little Bastard: An Illustrated History (Independent Release, Boston, MA, 2002)
- FourMinusOne: Split Decision (Independent Release, Boston, MA, 2002)
- Okkyoung Lee: Cello Music (Janice Records, New York, NY, 2000)
- Trikona; Trikona (Riparius Records, Charlottlesville, VA, 2000)
- FourMinusOne: At Any Given Moment (Independent Release, Boston, MA, 1999)
