= The Racket (radio program) =

- Other names: Three Hours of Power; Heavy Metal Racket
- Running time: 2 hours
- Country of origin: Australia
- Language: English
- Home station: Triple J
- Hosted by: Lochlan Watt
- Original release: 1990 – 10 December 2024
- Website: Official website

The Racket was an Australian heavy metal radio show airing on national youth broadcaster Triple J. It launched in 1990 as the Three Hours of Power, and aired on Tuesday nights until the show was retired at the end of 2024, alongside the departure of long-time presenter Lochlan Watt.

The programme showcased mostly new heavy metal releases and covered various sub-genres, particularly death metal. In the early 2000s, Triple J used to publish annual compilation CDs featuring the best music from the segment.

== Hosts ==
Past hosts of the show have included:

- Lochlan Watt (2012–2024)
- Mitch Alexander (filling in from 2019–2020)
- Andrew Haug (2002–2011)
- David McMillan (2001–2002)
- Costa Zouliou
- Francis Leach
- Helen Razer
