= Drummer =

Percussionist who creates and accompanies music using drums

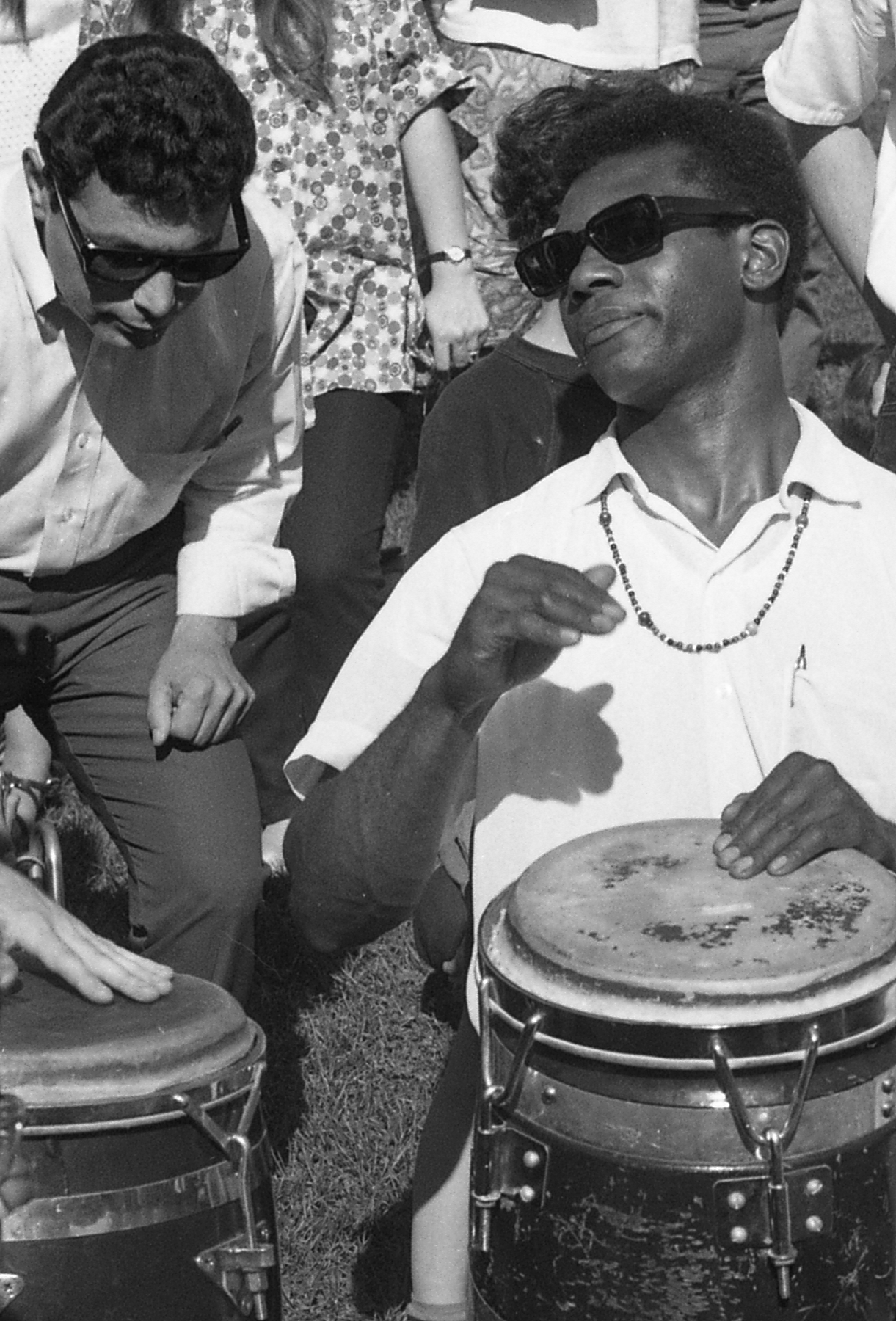
Hand drummers in Berkeley, California, about 1966

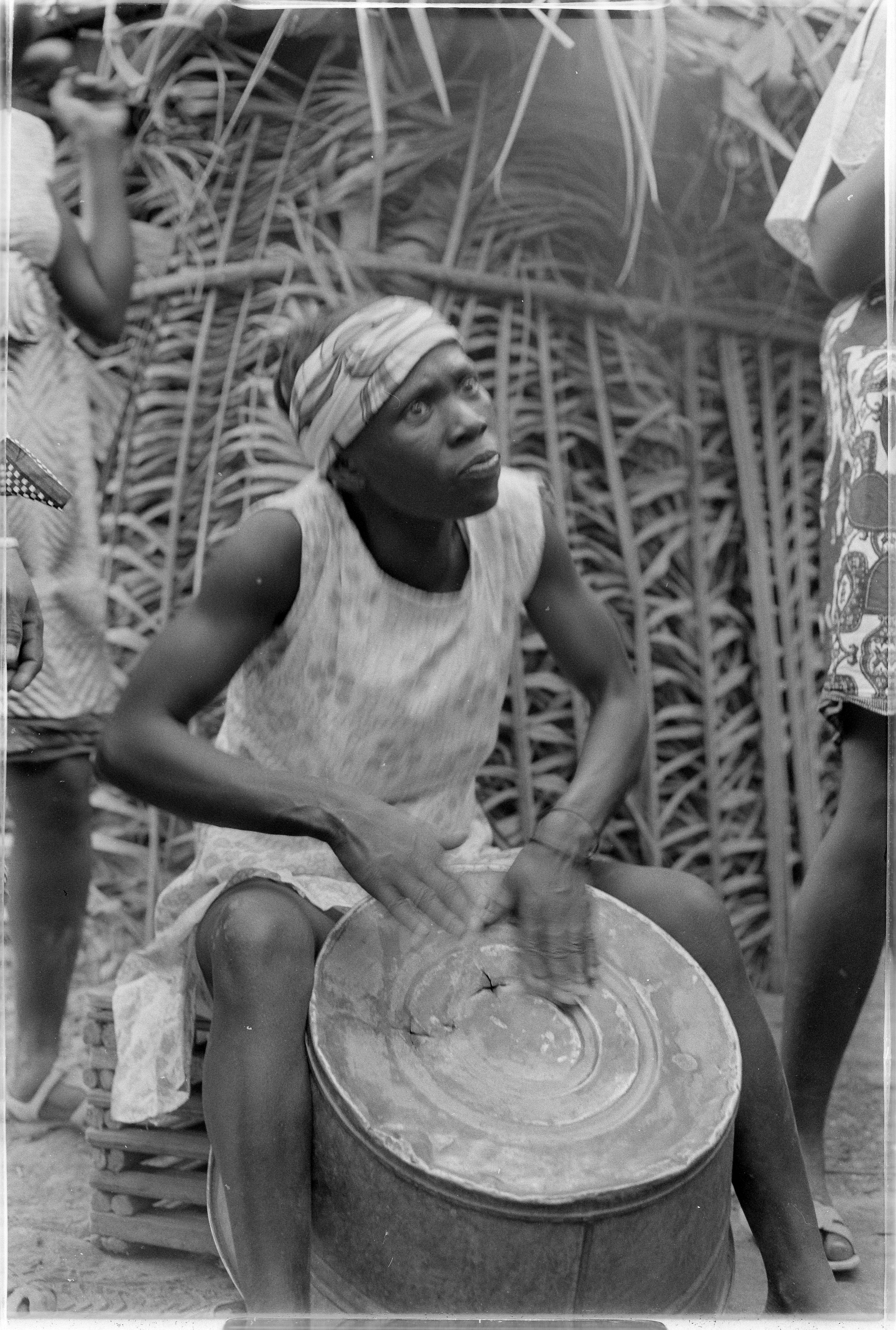
Drummer at a party in Canjambari, Guinea-Bissau, 1974

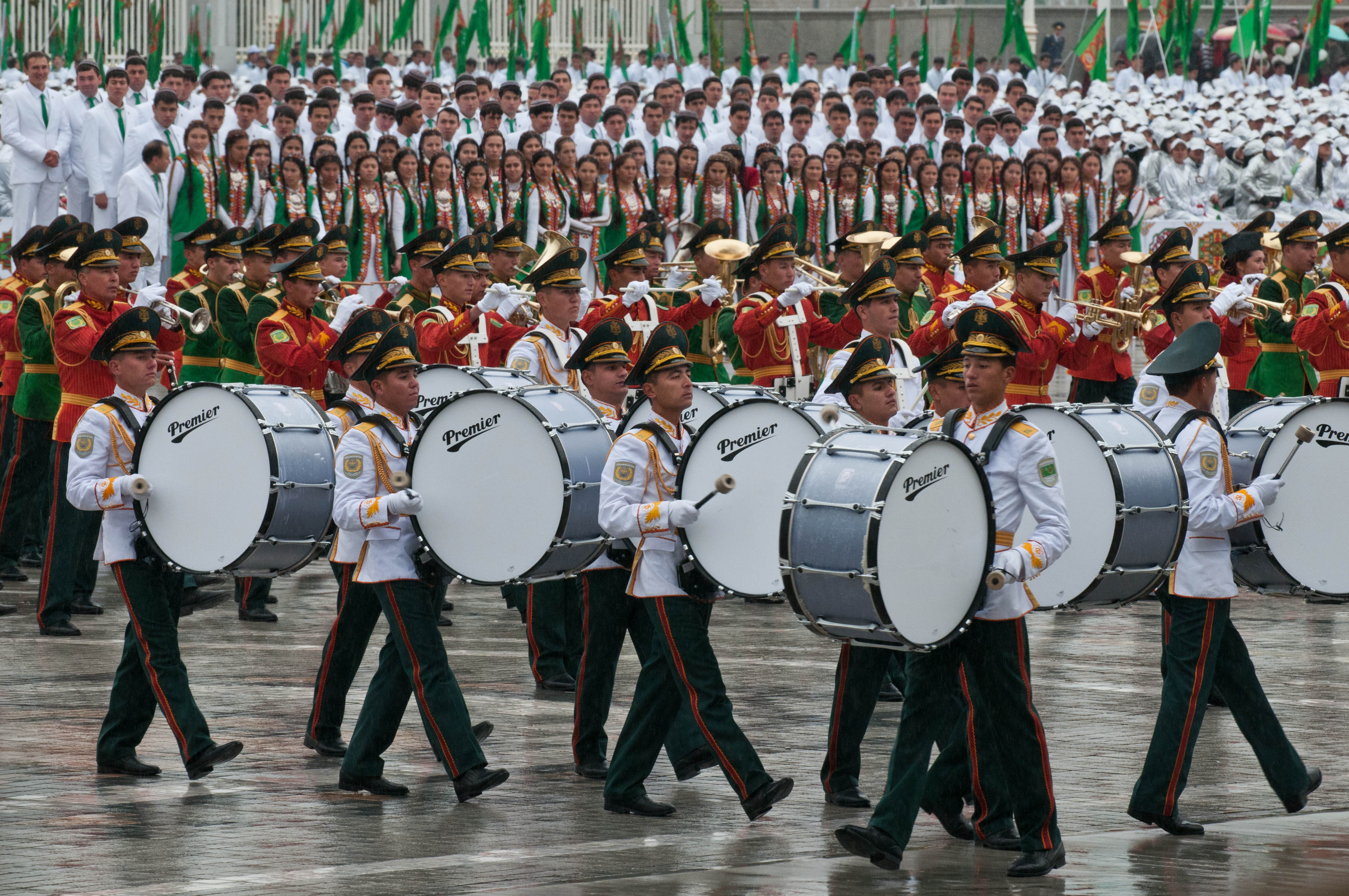
Turkmenistan Independence Day, 2011

A drummer is a percussionist who creates music using drums. Most contemporary western bands that play rock, pop, jazz, or R&B music include a drummer for purposes including timekeeping and embellishing the musical timbre. The drummer's equipment includes a drum kit (or "drum set" or "trap set"), which includes various drums, cymbals and an assortment of accessory hardware such as pedals, standing support mechanisms, and drum sticks.

Particularly in the traditional music of many countries, drummers use individual drums of various sizes and designs rather than drum kits. Some use only their hands to strike the drums.

In larger ensembles, the drummer may be part of a rhythm section with other percussionists playing. These musicians provide the timing and rhythmic foundation which allow the players of melodic instruments, including voices, to coordinate their musical performance.

Some famous drummers include: Max Roach, Ringo Starr (the Beatles), John Bonham (Led Zeppelin), Ginger Baker (Cream), Keith Moon (the Who), Neil Peart (Rush), Buddy Rich, Gene Krupa, Tony Williams, Elvin Jones, Sheila E, Brian Blade, Jack DeJohnette, Tim "Herb" Alexander (Primus), Phil Rudd (AC/DC), Roger Taylor (Queen), Charlie Watts (the Rolling Stones), Nick Mason (Pink Floyd), Bill Ward (Black Sabbath), Chad Smith (Red Hot Chili Peppers), Travis Barker (Blink-182), Phil Collins (Genesis), Rick Allen (Def Leppard), Alex Van Halen (Van Halen), Tré Cool (Green Day), Dave Grohl (Nirvana), Joey Jordison (Slipknot), Lars Ulrich (Metallica), Tommy Lee (Mötley Crüe), James "The Rev" Sullivan (Avenged Sevenfold), Cesar Zuiderwijk (Golden Earring) and Dave Lombardo (Slayer).

As well as the primary rhythmic function, in some musical styles, such as world, jazz, classical, and electronica, the drummer is called upon to provide solo and lead performances, at times when the main feature of the music is the rhythmic development. Drummers tend to possess considerable stamina and hands-eyes-legs coordination.

There are many tools that a drummer can use for either timekeeping or soloing. These include cymbals (china, crash, ride, splash, hi-hats, etc.), snare, toms, auxiliary percussion (bells, Latin drums, cowbells, temple blocks) and many others. There are also single, double, and triple bass pedals that drummers may use for the bass drum.

== Military ==
Before motorized transport became widespread, drummers played a key role in military conflicts. Military drummers provided drum cadences that set a steady marching pace and elevated troop morale on the battlefield. In some armies drums also assisted in combat by keeping cadence for firing and loading drills with muzzle loading guns. Military drummers were also employed on the parade field, when troops passed in review, and in various ceremonies including ominous drum rolls accompanying disciplinary punishments. Children also served as drummer boys well into the nineteenth century, though less commonly than is popularly assumed; due to the nature of the job, experienced older men were preferred.

In modern times, drummers are not employed in battle, but their ceremonial duties continue. Typically buglers and drummers mass under a sergeant-drummer and during marches alternately perform with the regiment or battalion ensembles.

Military-based musical percussion traditions were not limited exclusively to the western world. When Emir Osman I was appointed commander of the Turkish army on the Byzantine border in the late 13th century, he was symbolically installed via a handover of musical instruments by the Seldjuk sultan. In the Ottoman Empire, the size of a military band reflected the rank of its commander in chief: the largest band was reserved for the Sultan (viz. his Grand Vizier when taking the field). It included various percussion instruments, often adopted in European military music (as 'Janissary music'). The pitched bass drum is still known in some languages as the Turkish Drum.

Military drumming is the origin of Traditional grip as opposed to Matched grip of drumsticks.

== Parades ==
The drumline is a type of marching ensemble descended from military drummers, and can be arranged as a performance of a drum, a group of drummers, or as a part of a larger marching band. Their uniforms will often have a military style and a fancy hat. In recent times, it is more common to see drummers in parades wearing costumes with an African, Asian, Latin, Native American, or tribal look and sound.

== Cultural drumming ==
Various indigenous cultures use the drum to create a sense of unity with others especially during recreational events. The drum also helps in prayers and meditations.

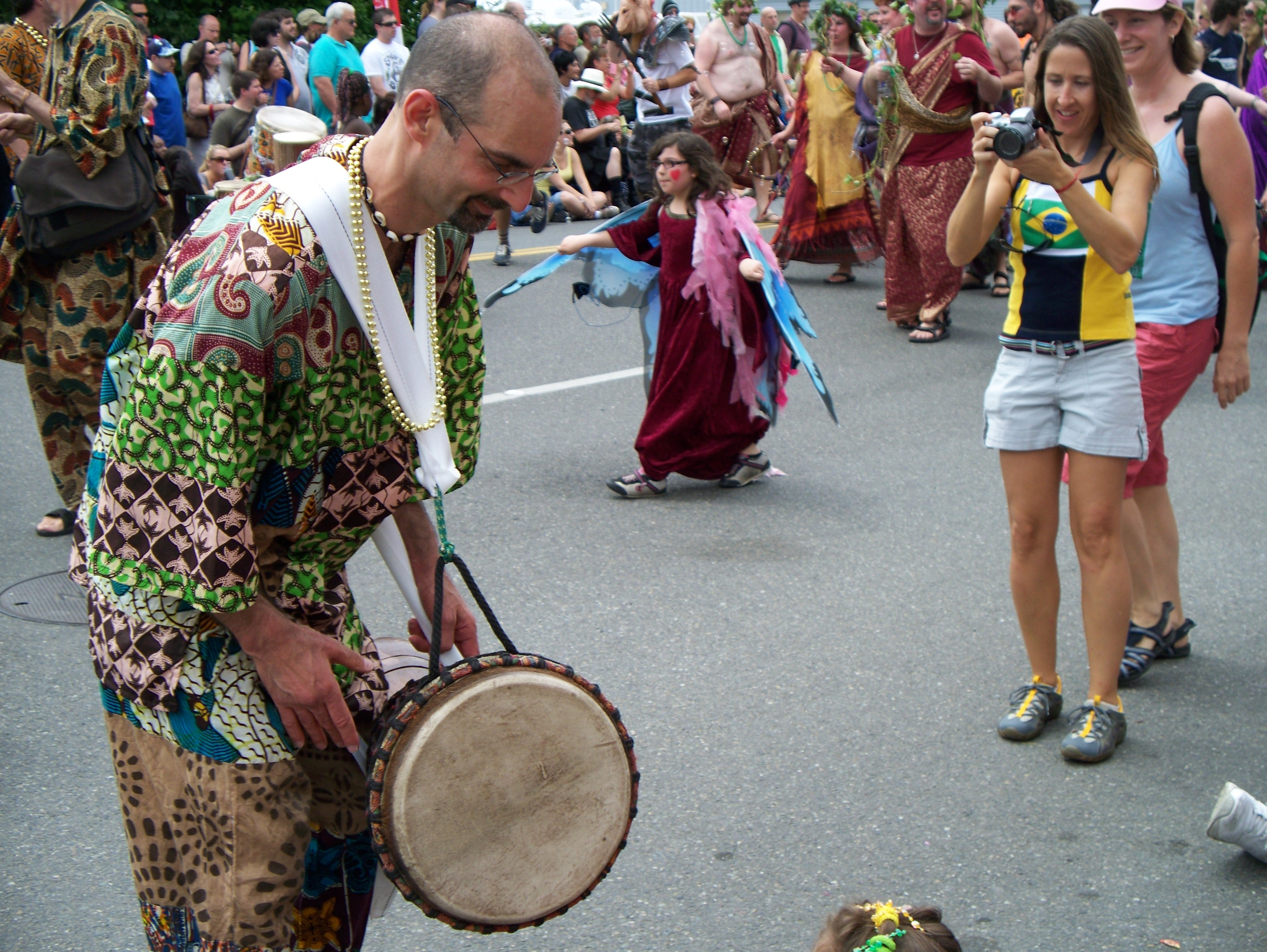
A drummer in a parade, 2008

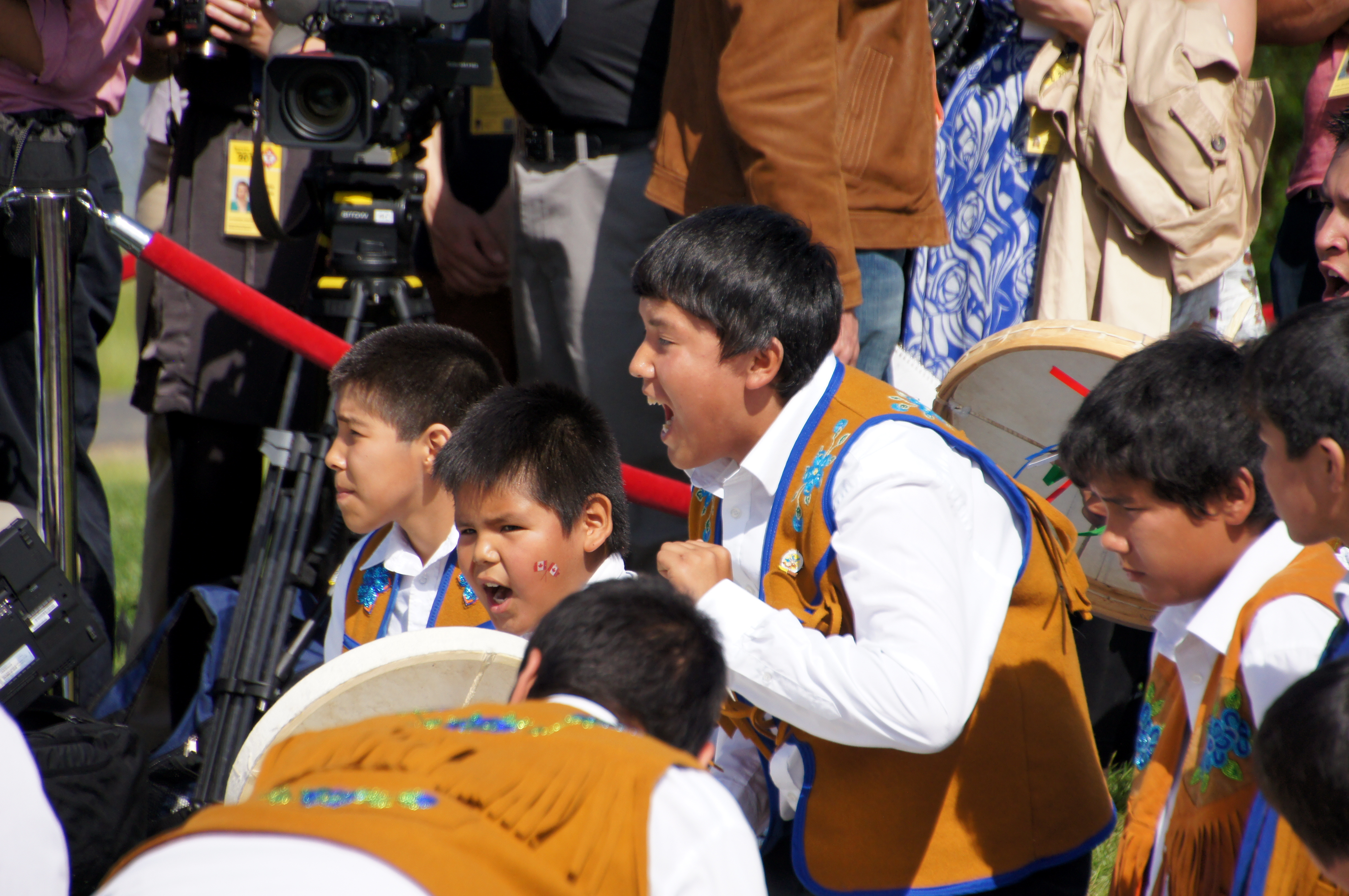
The Young Dene Drummers performed when Prince William and Kate visited Yellowknife, NWT on July 5, 2011.

== See also ==
- List of drummers
- Drum beat
- Drum machine
- Pipe band
