= Helmut Jederknüller =

Swedish musician

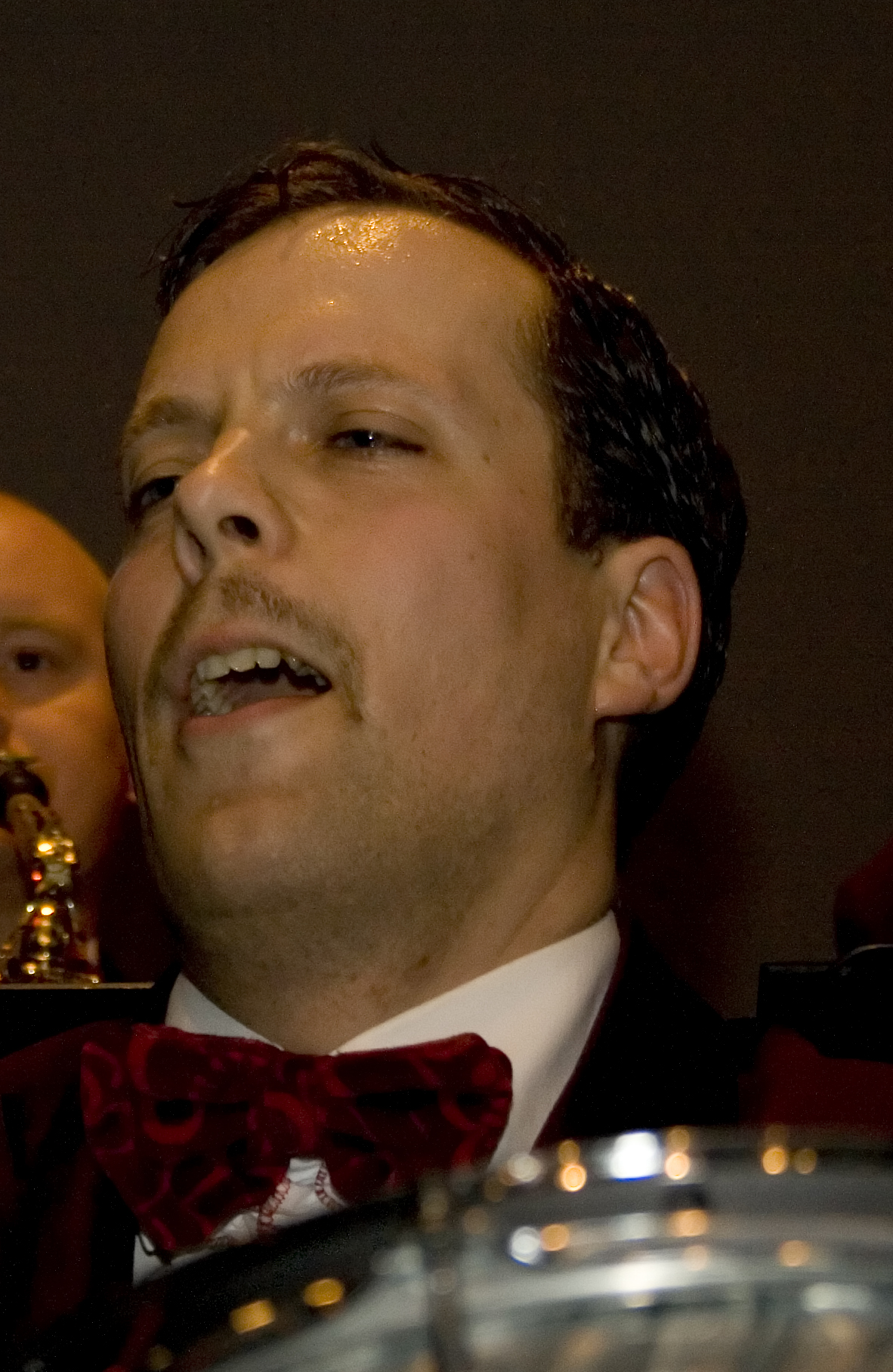

Background information
- Born: Marcus Wästlund; 1973 (age 51–52)
- Genres: Light music, Tijuali music, Latin, pop, easy-listening
- Occupation(s): Bandleader, composer, arranger, songwriter, singer, record producer
- Instrument(s): Drums, vocals
- Years active: 2004–present
- Website: jederknuller.org

Helmut Jederknüller is a Swedish musician most associated with the group known as Helmut Jederknüller mit seinem Super Stereo à Gogo Orchester, that plays light music as played in 1967–1973.

The band preserves the inheritance after artists like James Last, Bert Kaempfert, Frank Valdor, Joe Loss and Herb Alpert and his Tijuana Brass. Originated from Linköping, the Helmut Jederknüller band wants to give the Swedish audience a chance to enjoy this great music, that is almost forgotten.

For several years the annual tour through Germany has made the band a popular event at for instance the Duckstein Festival and Kielerwoche. Ostzee-Zeitung wrote after the performance at Stralsund's 775 years celebration festival that the band was "noch was besseres" than ABBA.
