= Andrew Haug =

Australian musician

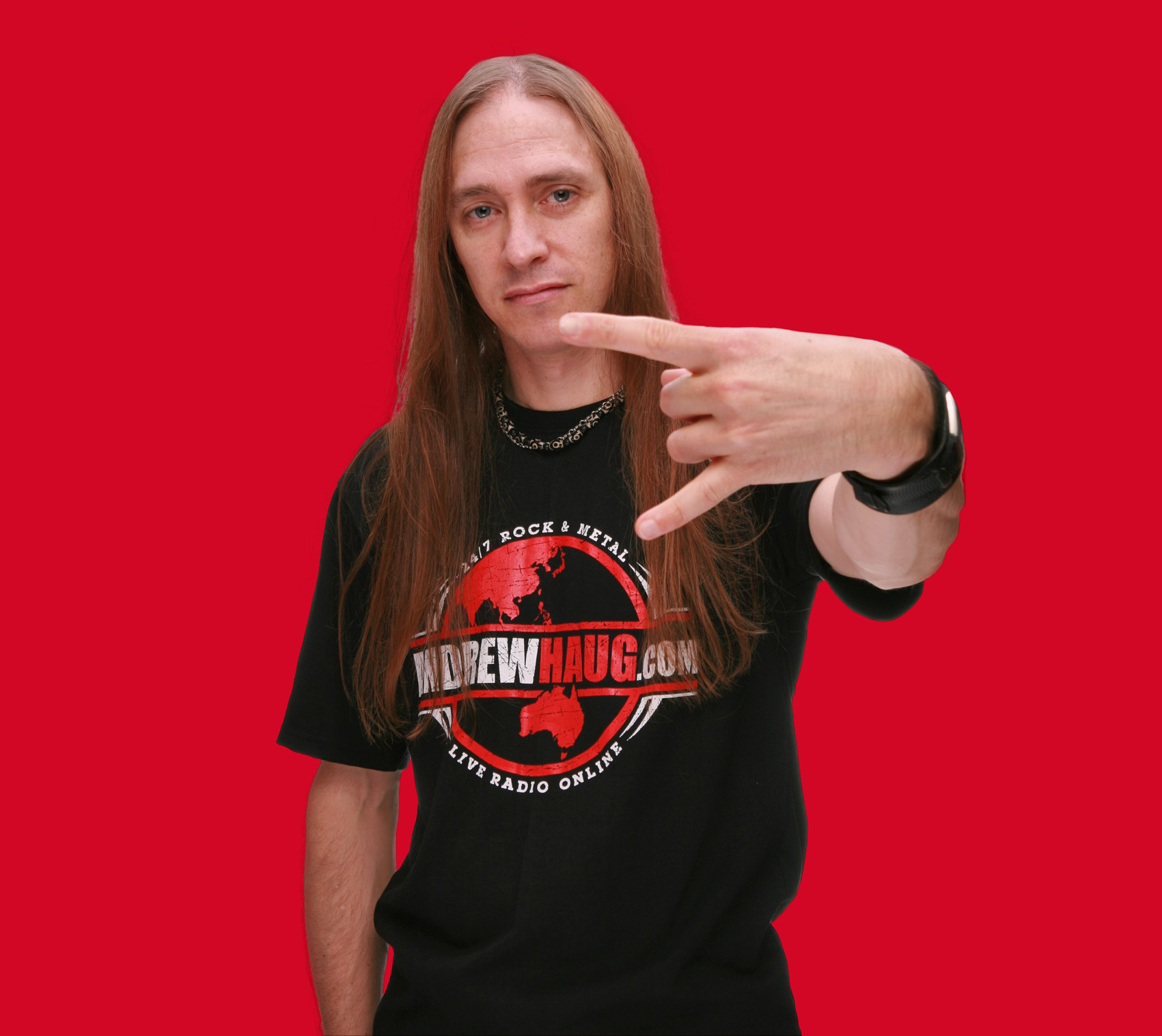
- Born: Melbourne, Victoria, Australia
- Occupations: Radio presenter, musician
- Years active: 1993–present
- Known for: Full Metal Racket
- Website: andrewhaug.com

Andrew Haug is an Australian radio announcer and heavy metal musician from Melbourne. He is one of the most prominent figures in Australia's largely underground heavy metal scene. Haug plays drums with Contrive, which also features his identical twin brother Paul Haug on vocals and guitar.

Haug started his radio career doing the heavy metal music program The Hard Report for Melbourne community radio station 3RRR. He was most notable as the presenter of the heavy metal music program Full Metal Racket (formerly 3 Hours of Power and currently The Racket) on Australian alternative music radio station Triple J, which he hosted from 2001 to 2011. He has stated that he did not leave Triple J by his choosing.

In 2002, Haug was convinced by Australian comedian John Safran to appear on his SBS television series John Safran's Music Jamboree. His appearance involved a Christian psychic who monitored him during a radio broadcast and at a Contrive live gig, claiming she could see "dark spirits" who were supposedly attracted to him due to his interest in heavy metal music.

Andrew has also been a guest programmer for ABC's music video show Rage as well as MTV's Headbangers Ball.

== Early life ==
Andrew was born in Melbourne, Victoria, along with twin brother Paul.

== Career ==
Haug started working in radio in 1993, with a local demo segment on Melbourne's 3RRRFM Metal Show. Haug soon became the lead host of the show, spanning all facets of the program including interviews with several hundred local and international artists right up until leaving the station for a new opportunity.

In 2001, he became the host of Triple J's national weekly metal program, Full Metal Racket. Over his decade-long run he conducted 612 interviews with musicians such as James Hetfield, Ozzy Osbourne, Maynard James Keenan, Ronnie James Dio, Rob Halford, and interviewed Steve Harris of Iron Maiden on board their plane, Ed Force One. Haug once convinced JJJ management to do a live seven-hour straight metal radio marathon.

In 1995, Haug co-hosted a local TV music show on Channel 31, Metal Vision. This lasted for two years and included local and international interviews with the likes of Fear Factory and Deicide, as well as general music discussion. In 2002 he hosted the long-standing national TV music show Rage, handpicking five hours of his favourite rock and metal video clips, and in 2006 hosted a four-hour special on MTV's Headbangers Ball dedicated to the acts on that year's Gigantour festival.

Haug has stated that he did not leave Triple J's The Racket voluntarily.

In June 2012, Haug revealed his plan to create a dedicated rock and metal online radio station in Australia. The station was officially launched on 20 November 2012. In 2017, the station started a partnership with platform iHeartRadio.

From 2012, Haug hosted a weekly two-hour metal show, Haugmetal for Soundwave festival's online radio station, Soundwave Pirate Radio.

Haug has written music columns for Kerrang! Australia, Roadrunner Australia's Outsider Magazine, plus weekly metal music columns for various street press magazines.

He was the sole label and marketing manager at the Australian branch of German-based record label Century Media (Arch Enemy, Suicide Silence, Lacuna Coil, Architects) from 1998 to 2014 full time.

Haug managed and played drums for the heavy metal band Contrive with his twin brother Paul. They released two EPs and three albums to date and toured the USA in May 2019 on a 25 Date tour with Polish progressive band Riverside. They also played in Australia with Machine Head, Opeth, Stone Sour, Coroner, Cavalera Conspiracy, Testament, Sepultura, Soilwork, Mayhem, Skinlab, and Parkway Drive.

AndrewHaug.com, is now in its 11 years of broadcasting 24/7 Metal Online.

== Personal life ==
2020, during the Covid pandemic, Haug, with his long-time interest in self-development, undertook 2 years of full-time study to become a life coach, to which he now operates under the banner Arise Coaching

Haug, being an avid endurance runner on & off over the years, restarted in October 2019 doing a 10km fun run in Vietnam. He then ran once a week, often full marathons or ultra-marathons to distances of 60+km. In June 2023, Haug did his first ever 100KM run. You can find him on Strava.

He is also plant-based vegan since 2012 and alcohol-free since 2008.
