= List of Vader band members =

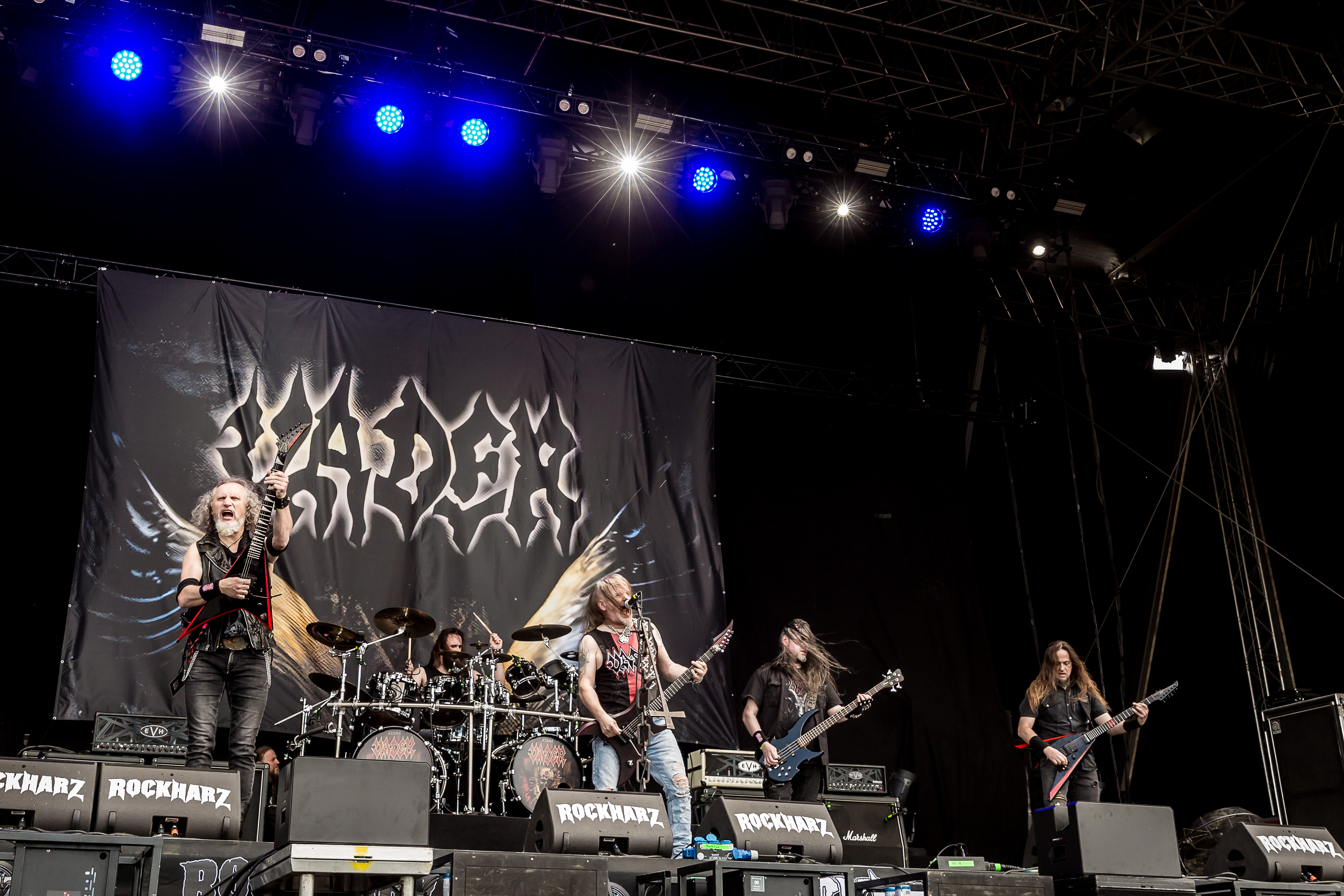
Vader performing live in 2025.

Vader is a Polish death metal band from Olsztyn. Formed in early 1983, the group originally consisted of lead guitarist Zbigniew "Vika" Wróblewski, rhythm guitarist Piotr "Peter" Wiwczarek, bassist Jarek Czarniecki and drummer Daniel Markowski, who worked with numerous vocalists during their early years. Wiwczarek (now on vocals and lead guitar) is the sole remaining member of the original lineup, with the band currently also featuring rhythm guitarists Maurycy "Mauser" Stefanowicz (a member from 1997 to 2008, and since 2024) and Marek "Spider" Pająk (since 2010), bassist Tomasz "Hal" Halicki (since 2011), and drummer Michał Andrzejczyk (since 2022).

== History ==
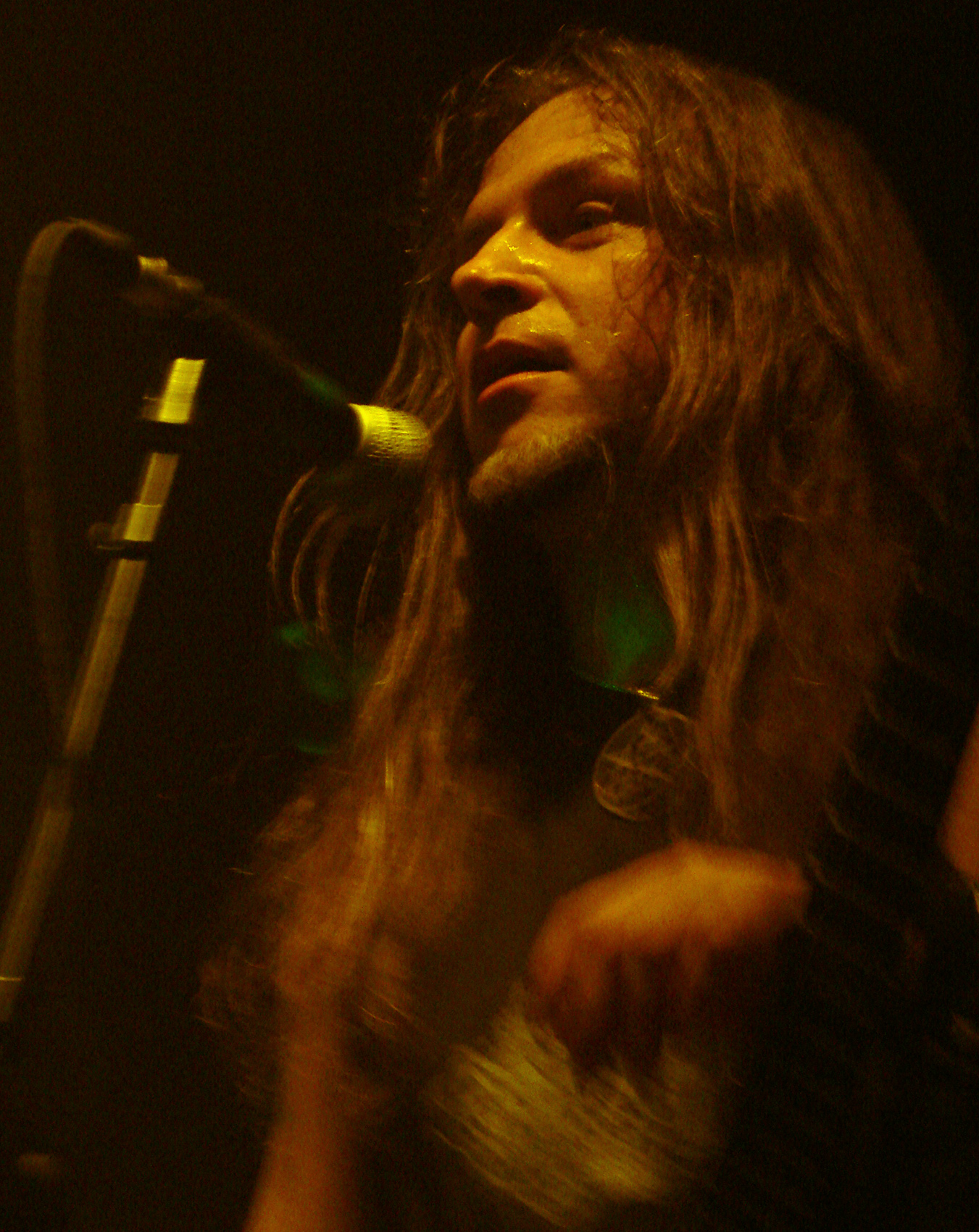
Piotr "Peter" Wiwczarek has been a member of Vader since the band's inception in 1983. He took over as vocalist in 1988.

=== 1983–1989 ===
Vader was formed during early 1983 by guitarists Piotr "Peter" Wiwczarek and Zbigniew "Vika" Wróblewski, bassist Jarek Czarniecki, and drummer Daniel Markowski. During their early years, the band worked with numerous short-term vocalists, with Wróblewski estimating they rehearsed and/or performed with more than 20. The first was Artur Pniewski, who was temporarily drafted in from local band Flotylla for the band's first couple of shows, but left a few weeks later as he thought the band's music was "too extreme". Other confirmed frontmen included Robert Bielak, who spent only a brief time in the position during either 1983 or 1984; Jacek Mehring, who was in the band for "a good few months" during 1984; and Piotr "Snake" Tomaszewski, who joined at the end of 1984 and remained until he suddenly left to join the army in the spring of 1985.

Personnel changes also occurred elsewhere in the lineup during the band's first two years. Markowski was fired relatively early after a poor rehearsal during which Wiwczarek, who had no experience on drums, had to show him how to play a part. His replacement, Adam Skwarek, was dismissed after just one rehearsal, after reportedly trying to take control of the band against Wiwczarek and Wróblewski's wishes. Skwarek was replaced around late 1984 by Grzegorz "Belial" Jackowski, who was recommended by then-vocalist Tomaszewski. On bass, Czarniecki left around late 1983/early 1984 to focus on his studies, with Robert "Astaroth" Struczewski taking his place.

According to Wiwczarek, the "real beginning of Vader" was September 1985, when Robert "Czarny" Czarneta took over as the band's vocalist; the rest of the lineup at this time included Wróblewski and Wiwczarek on guitars, Struczewski on bass, and Jackowski on drums. Wróblewski left the band the following May, after they changed their music to focus on "more brutal and aggressive" styles. Reduced to a quartet, the group released its first demo Live in Decay, recorded at a rehearsal session, later in 1986. Czarneta and Jackowski both left in May 1988; Wiwczarek took over vocal duties at this point, while Krzysztof "Docent" Raczkowski joined as the band's new drummer.

=== 1989–2005 ===
By early 1989, bassist Struczewski had also left Vader, leaving Wiwczarek and Raczkowski to record the band's first studio demo, Necrolust, as a two-piece. That August, Jacek "Jackie" Kalisz took over on bass. In November 1990, the band released their third demo, Morbid Reich. Vader returned to a four-piece lineup starting in August 1991 with the addition of second guitarist Jarosław "China" Łabieniec, while Kalisz was briefly dismissed in early 1992 due to "personal issues", replaced by Piotr "Berial" Kuzioła. By the time the band released their first full-length album The Ultimate Incantation that November, Kalisz had returned to the lineup.

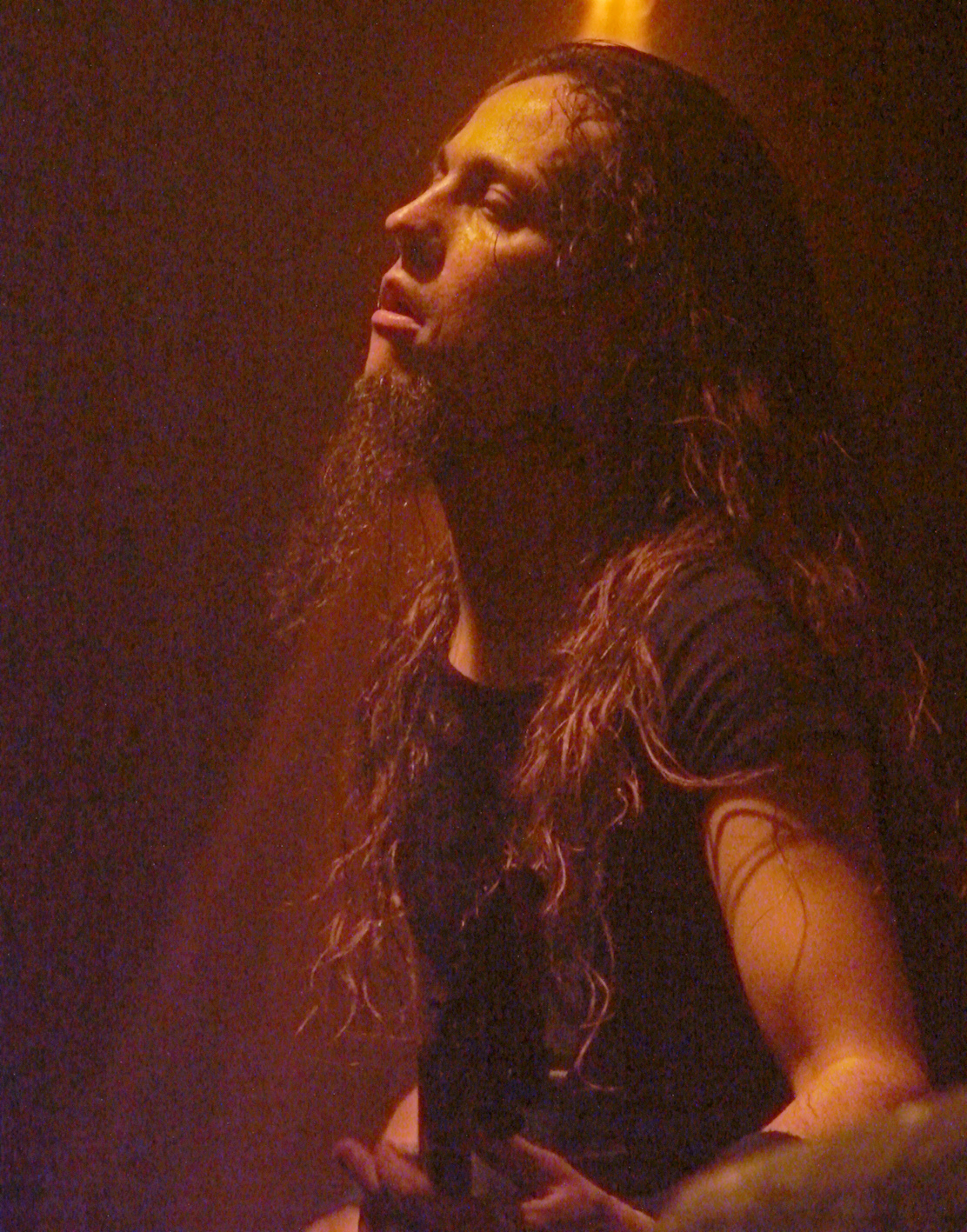
Maurycy "Mauser" Stefanowicz spent 11 years as Vader's rhythm guitarist starting in 1997. He rejoined in 2023, initially as a touring member.

After a tour which spawned the live album The Darkest Age: Live '93, Kalisz was replaced by Leszek "Shambo" Rakowski at the beginning of 1994. The new lineup recorded the EP Sothis, studio album De Profundis and covers album Future of the Past, before Łabieniec was replaced by Maurycy "Mauser" Stefanowicz ahead of an American tour in February 1997. This lineup remained in place for over four years, releasing the studio albums Black to the Blind (1997) and Litany (2000), EPs Kingdom (1998) and Reign Forever World (2000), and live collections Vision and Voice and Live in Japan (both 1998). During a tour in late 1999, Raczkowski took a brief hiatus from touring with Vader due to his problems with drug addiction, with Marcin "Ząbek" Gołębiewski brought in temporarily to take his place. In September 2001, it was announced that Rakowski had left the band.

Rakowski was replaced in November 2001 by Hunter bassist Konrad "Saimon" Karchut. After the release of Revelations in 2002, Karchut was replaced by former Behemoth bassist Marcin "Novy" Nowak in June 2003. Recording started for the band's next album in February 2004, but had to be delayed when drummer Raczkowski injured his hand and leg in the studio. Vesania drummer Dariusz "Daray" Brzozowski was brought in as a temporary substitute, with The Beast recorded between May and June. Brzozowski became a permanent member in March 2005, when Raczkowski was fired due to ongoing problems with alcohol abuse. Raczkowski later died in August 2005.

=== Since 2005 ===
With their new permanent drummer Brzozowski, Vader released the EP The Art of War in 2005, studio album Impressions in Blood in 2006, live video And Blood Was Shed in Warsaw in 2007, and re-recordings collection XXV in 2008. Their next lineup change occurred in June 2008, when Marcin "Novy" Nowak left in between tours, leading the band to bring in former Decapitated bassist Marcin "Martin" Rygiel as temporary stand-in for the summer. Nowak later attributed his departure to "recent decisions being made within the band". Just a couple of months later, guitarist Stefanowicz and drummer Brzozowski both left Vader as well, making their final appearances at the band's 25th anniversary show on 30 August 2008. Stefanowicz later confirmed he had left to focus on his other band UnSun, while Brzozowski took over as drummer for Dimmu Borgir.

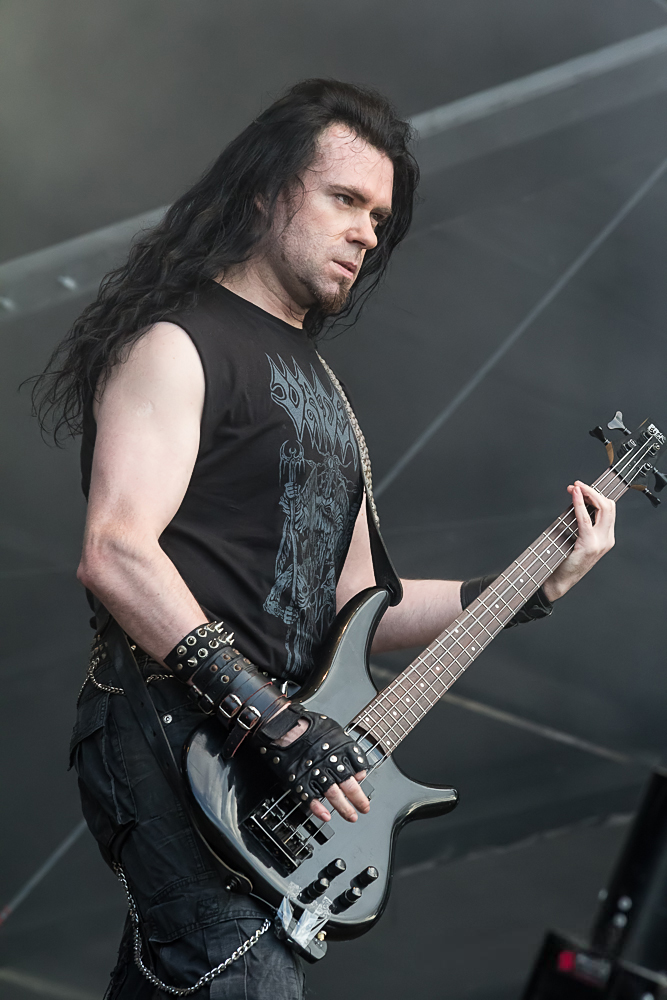
Tomasz "Hal" Halicki has been Vader's bassist since 2011.

In September 2008, Vader announced a new lineup featuring guitarist Wacław "Vogg" Kiełtyka (formerly of Decapitated and Lux Occulta), bassist Tomasz "Reyash" Rejek (of Witchmaster and Christ Agony) and drummer Paweł "Paul" Jaroszewicz (of Soul Snatcher) — all were initially described as "session musicians", rather than full-time members. Necropolis, which featured only frontman Wiwczarek and Jaroszewicz, was released in 2009. At the end of the year, the band announced that Kiełtyka could no longer tour with them due to the recent reformation of Decapitated, with Marek "Spider" Pająk enlisted to stand in for tour dates in January and February 2010. Marco Martell took over for a North American tour between March and May 2010, before Pająk returned as a full-time member upon their return to Europe.

Rejek announced his departure from Vader in February 2011, claiming that he was leaving due to "personal reasons". Wiwczarek later disputed this, claiming that he had fired Rejek in January based on the bassist's "recent behavior", as well as naming Tomasz "Hal" Halicki his successor. At the same time, the band also announced that Jaroszewicz would be leaving the band due to "family matters", but that he would remain for the upcoming recording of Welcome to the Morbid Reich and all existing shows. Starting from mid-July, Jaroszewicz was replaced by James Stewart. This new lineup remained in place for over ten years, releasing Tibi et Igni, Future of the Past II: Hell in the East, Before the Age of Chaos: Live 2015, The Empire, Dark Age, Thy Messenger, Solitude in Madness and Wings of Death Over Hong Kong.

In February 2022, Michał Andrzejczyk replaced Stewart, who had decided to leave a couple of years earlier. Stewart later explained his decision to leave, stating that he "fucking loved" working with the band, but admitting that "after all this time I didn't feel like I was going to be able to put 100% into Vader going forward". During the band's 40th anniversary tour in 2023, former guitarist Maurycy "Mauser" Stefanowicz made several guest appearances with the band, playing the second half of multiple shows. In January 2024, it was announced that Stefanowicz had returned to the band's lineup, making it a three-guitarist setup for the first time. The band released the EP Humanihility in 2025.

== Official members ==
=== Current ===
| Image | Name | Years active | Instruments | Release contributions |
|---|---|---|---|---|
| | Piotr "Peter" Wiwczarek | 1983–present | lead and rhythm guitars; vocals (since 1988); studio bass (until 2011) | all Vader releases |
| | Maurycy "Mauser" Stefanowicz | 1997–2008; 2024–present (live guest 2023) | rhythm guitar; lead guitar (2024–present) | all Vader releases from Black to the Blind (1997) to XXV (2008); Humanihility (2025) |
| | Marek "Spider" Pająk | 2010–present (stand-in only early 2010) | rhythm guitar; studio bass (2011 only) | all Vader releases from Welcome to the Morbid Reich (2011) to date |
| | Tomasz "Hal" Halicki | 2011–present | bass | all Vader releases from Tibi et Igni (2014) to date, except Dark Age (2017) |
| | Michał Andrzejczyk | 2022–present | drums | Humanihility (2025) |

=== Former ===
| Image | Name | Years active | Instruments | Release contributions |
|---|---|---|---|---|
| | Zbigniew "Vika" Wróblewski (1962–2023) | 1983–1986 | lead guitar | none |
| | Robert "Astaroth" Struczewski (1967–2010) | 1984–1989 | bass | Live in Decay (1986) |
| | Grzegorz "Belial" Jackowski | 1984–1988 | drums | Live in Decay (1986) |
| | Robert "Czarny" Czarneta | 1985–1988 | vocals | Live in Decay (1986) |
| | Krzysztof "Doc" Raczkowski (1970–2005) | 1988–2005 | drums | all Vader releases from Necrolust (1989) to Blood (2003); Night of the Apocalypse (2004) |
| | Jacek "Jackie" Kalisz | 1989–1992; 1992–1994 | live bass | The Darkest Age: Live '93 (1994) |
| | Jarosław "China" Łabieniec | 1991–1997 | rhythm guitar | The Darkest Age: Live '93 (1994); Sothis (1994); De Profundis (1995); Future of the Past (1996) |
| | Piotr "Berial" Kuzioła | 1992 | live bass | Future of the Past II: Hell in the East (2015) |
| | Leszek "Shambo" Rakowski | 1994–2001 | live bass | Vision and Voice (1998); Live in Japan (1998); Reign Forever World (2000) |
| | Konrad "Saimon" Karchut | 2001–2003 | live bass | Night of the Apocalypse (2004) |
| | Marcin "Novy" Nowak | 2003–2008 | live bass | Night of the Apocalypse (2004); And Blood Was Shed in Warsaw (2007); XXV (2008) |
| | Dariusz "Daray" Brzozowski | 2004–2008 (stand-in only 2004–2005) | drums | all Vader releases from The Beast (2004) to XXV (2008) |
| | Paweł "Paul" Jaroszewicz | 2008–2011 | drums | Necropolis (2009); Welcome to the Morbid Reich (2011) |
| | Tomasz "Reyash" Rejek | 2008–2011 | live bass | Necropolis (2009) — bonus live DVD only |
| | Wacław "Vogg" Kiełtyka | 2008–2010 | rhythm guitar (live only) | Necropolis (2009) — bonus live DVD only |
| | James Stewart | 2011–2022 | drums | all Vader releases from Tibi et Igni (2014) to Wings of Death Over Hong Kong (2021) |

== Other members ==
=== Stand-in members ===
| Image | Name | Years active | Instruments | Details |
|---|---|---|---|---|
| | Artur Pniewski | 1983 | vocals | Pniewski appeared as Vader's unofficial vocalist at their first couple of shows, but left after a few weeks. |
| | Marcin "Ząbek" Gołębiewski | 1999 | drums | Gołębiewski briefly filled in for regular drummer Krzysztof "Doc" Raczkowski during a tour in late 1999. |
| | Marco Martell | 2010 | rhythm guitar | Martell temporarily joined the band on guitar for the North American Killfest Tour from April to May 2010. |

=== Early members ===
The following list contains early members of Vader whose tenure is unknown or unclear.

| Image | Name | Years active | Instruments | Details |
|---|---|---|---|---|
| | Jarek Czarniecki | 1983/1984 | bass | Czarniecki was Vader's original bassist. He left the band around late 1983/early 1984 to focus on his studies. |
| | Daniel Markowski | 1983 | drums | Markowski was Vader's original drummer. He was fired after just a few months following a poor rehearsal. |
| | Adam Skwarek | 1983 | drums | Skwarek replaced Markowski in the band. He played at one rehearsal, before being fired for being too controlling. |
| | Robert Bielak | 1983/1984 | vocals | Bielak was one of many early vocalists for Vader. He stayed for only a short time, likely not playing a single show. |
| | Jacek Mehring | 1984 | vocals | Mehring was another of Vader's early vocalists. He was in the band for "a good few months" during 1984. |
| | Piotr "Snake" Tomaszewski (1965–1997) | 1984/1985 | vocals | Tomaszewski took over as Vader's vocalist in late 1984, remaining until spring 1985 when he joined the army. |

== Timeline ==
Note: The timeline starts from September 1985, when the band's first full confirmed lineup was established.

== Lineups ==
Note: The list of lineups starts from September 1985, when the band's first full confirmed lineup was established.

| Period | Members | Releases |
|---|---|---|
| September 1985–May 1986 | Robert "Czarny" Czarneta — vocals; Zbigniew "Vika" Wróblewski — lead guitar; Piotr "Peter" Wiwczarek — rhythm guitar; Robert "Astaroth" Struczewski — bass; Grzegorz "Belial" Jackowski — drums | none |
| May 1986–May 1988 | Robert "Czarny" Czarneta — vocals; Piotr "Peter" Wiwczarek — guitar; Robert "Astaroth" Struczewski — bass; Grzegorz "Belial" Jackowski — drums | Live in Decay (1986) |
| May 1988–early 1989 | Piotr "Peter" Wiwczarek — vocals, guitar; Robert "Astaroth" Struczewski — bass; Krzysztof "Docent" Raczkowski — drums | none |
| Early–summer 1989 | Piotr "Peter" Wiwczarek — vocals, guitar, bass; Krzysztof "Docent" Raczkowski — drums | Necrolust (1989) |
| August 1989–August 1991 | Piotr "Peter" Wiwczarek — vocals, guitar, studio bass; Jacek "Jackie" Kalisz — live bass; Krzysztof "Docent" Raczkowski — drums | Morbid Reich (1990) |
| August 1991–early 1992 | Piotr "Peter" Wiwczarek — vocals, lead guitar, studio bass; Jarosław "China" Łabieniec — rhythm guitar; Jacek "Jackie" Kalisz — live bass; Krzysztof "Docent" Raczkowski — drums | none |
| Early–late 1992 | Piotr "Peter" Wiwczarek — vocals, lead guitar, studio bass; Jarosław "China" Łabieniec — rhythm guitar; Piotr "Berial" Kuzioła — live bass; Krzysztof "Docent" Raczkowski — drums | none |
| Late 1992–early 1994 | Piotr "Peter" Wiwczarek — vocals, lead guitar, studio bass; Jarosław "China" Łabieniec — rhythm guitar; Jacek "Jackie" Kalisz — live bass; Krzysztof "Doc" Raczkowski — drums | The Ultimate Incantation (1992); The Darkest Age: Live '93 (1994) |
| Early 1994–early 1997 | Piotr "Peter" Wiwczarek — vocals, lead guitar, studio bass; Jarosław "China" Łabieniec — rhythm guitar; Leszek "Shambo" Rakowski — live bass; Krzysztof "Doc" Raczkowski — drums | Sothis (1994); De Profundis (1995); Future of the Past (1996) |
| Early 1997–September 2001 | Piotr "Peter" Wiwczarek — vocals, lead guitar, studio bass; Maurycy "Mauser" Stefanowicz — rhythm guitar; Leszek "Shambo" Rakowski — live bass; Krzysztof "Doc" Raczkowski — drums | Black to the Blind (1997); Kingdom (1998); Vision and Voice (1998); Live in Japan (1998); Litany (2000); Reign Forever World (2000) |
| November 2001–June 2003 | Piotr "Peter" Wiwczarek — vocals, lead guitar, studio bass; Maurycy "Mauser" Stefanowicz — rhythm guitar; Konrad "Saimon" Karchut — live bass; Krzysztof "Doc" Raczkowski — drums | "Angel of Death" (2002); Revelations (2002); Night of the Apocalypse (2005) (Live at Łeg Studio and Metalmania 2003) |
| June 2003–February 2004 | Piotr "Peter" Wiwczarek — vocals, lead guitar, studio bass; Maurycy "Mauser" Stefanowicz — rhythm guitar; Marcin "Novy" Nowak — live bass; Krzysztof "Docent" Raczkowski — drums | Blood (2003) |
| February 2004–March 2005 | Piotr "Peter" Wiwczarek — vocals, lead guitar, studio bass; Maurycy "Mauser" Stefanowicz — rhythm guitar; Marcin "Novy" Nowak — live bass; Krzysztof "Docent" Raczkowski — drums (on hiatus); Dariusz "Daray" Brzozowski — drums (stand-in) | The Beast (2004); Night of the Apocalypse (2005) (Supporting Slipknot and Metallica 2004) |
| March 2005–June 2008 | Piotr "Peter" Wiwczarek — vocals, lead guitar, bass (studio only until 2008); Maurycy "Mauser" Stefanowicz — rhythm guitar; Marcin "Novy" Nowak — bass (live only until 2008); Dariusz "Daray" Brzozowski — drums | The Art of War (2005); Impressions in Blood (2006); And Blood Was Shed in Warsaw (2007); XXV (2008) |
| June–August 2008 | Piotr "Peter" Wiwczarek — vocals, lead guitar, bass; Maurycy "Mauser" Stefanowicz — rhythm guitar; Marcin "Martin" Rygiel — bass (stand-in); Dariusz "Daray" Brzozowski — drums | none |
| September 2008–December 2009 | Piotr "Peter" Wiwczarek — vocals, lead guitar, studio rhythm guitar and bass; Wacław "Vogg" Kiełtyka — live rhythm guitar; Tomasz "Reyash" Rejek — live bass; Paweł "Paul" Jaroszewicz — drums | Necropolis (2009) |
| January–March 2010 | Piotr "Peter" Wiwczarek — vocals, lead guitar, studio bass; Marek "Spider" Pająk — rhythm guitar (stand-in); Tomasz "Reyash" Rejek — live bass; Paweł "Paul" Jaroszewicz — drums | none |
| March–May 2010 | Piotr "Peter" Wiwczarek — vocals, lead guitar, studio bass; Marco Martell — rhythm guitar (stand-in); Tomasz "Reyash" Rejek — live bass; Paweł "Paul" Jaroszewicz — drums | none |
| May 2010–January 2011 | Piotr "Peter" Wiwczarek — vocals, lead guitar, studio bass; Marek "Spider" Pająk — rhythm guitar; Tomasz "Reyash" Rejek — live bass; Paweł "Paul" Jaroszewicz — drums | none |
| January–April 2011 | Piotr "Peter" Wiwczarek — vocals, lead guitar, bass; Marek "Spider" Pająk — rhythm guitar, bass; Paweł "Paul" Jaroszewicz — drums | Welcome to the Morbid Reich (2011) |
| April–July 2011 | Piotr "Peter" Wiwczarek — vocals, lead guitar; Marek "Spider" Pająk — rhythm guitar; Tomasz "Hal" Halicki — bass; Paweł "Paul" Jaroszewicz — drums | none |
| July 2011–February 2022 | Piotr "Peter" Wiwczarek — vocals, lead guitar; Marek "Spider" Pająk — rhythm guitar; Tomasz "Hal" Halicki — bass; James Stewart — drums | Tibi et Igni (2014); Future of the Past II: Hell in the East (2015); Before the Age of Chaos: Live 2015 (2016); The Empire (2016); Dark Age (2017) — four new tracks; Thy Messenger (2019); Solitude in Madness (2020); Wings of Death Over Hong Kong (2021) |
| February 2022–January 2024 | Piotr "Peter" Wiwczarek — vocals, lead guitar; Marek "Spider" Pająk — rhythm guitar; Tomasz "Hal" Halicki — bass; Michał Andrzejczyk — drums | none |
| January 2024–present | Piotr "Peter" Wiwczarek — vocals, lead guitar; Marek "Spider" Pająk — rhythm guitar; Maurycy "Mauser" Stefanowicz — lead and rhythm guitar; Tomasz "Hal" Halicki — bass; Michał Andrzejczyk — drums | Humanihility (2025) |

== Bibliography ==
- Szubrycht, Jarek (23 August 2023), Vader: Wojna Totalna, Kraków, Poland: SQN, ISBN 978-8383300726
