= Vader discography =

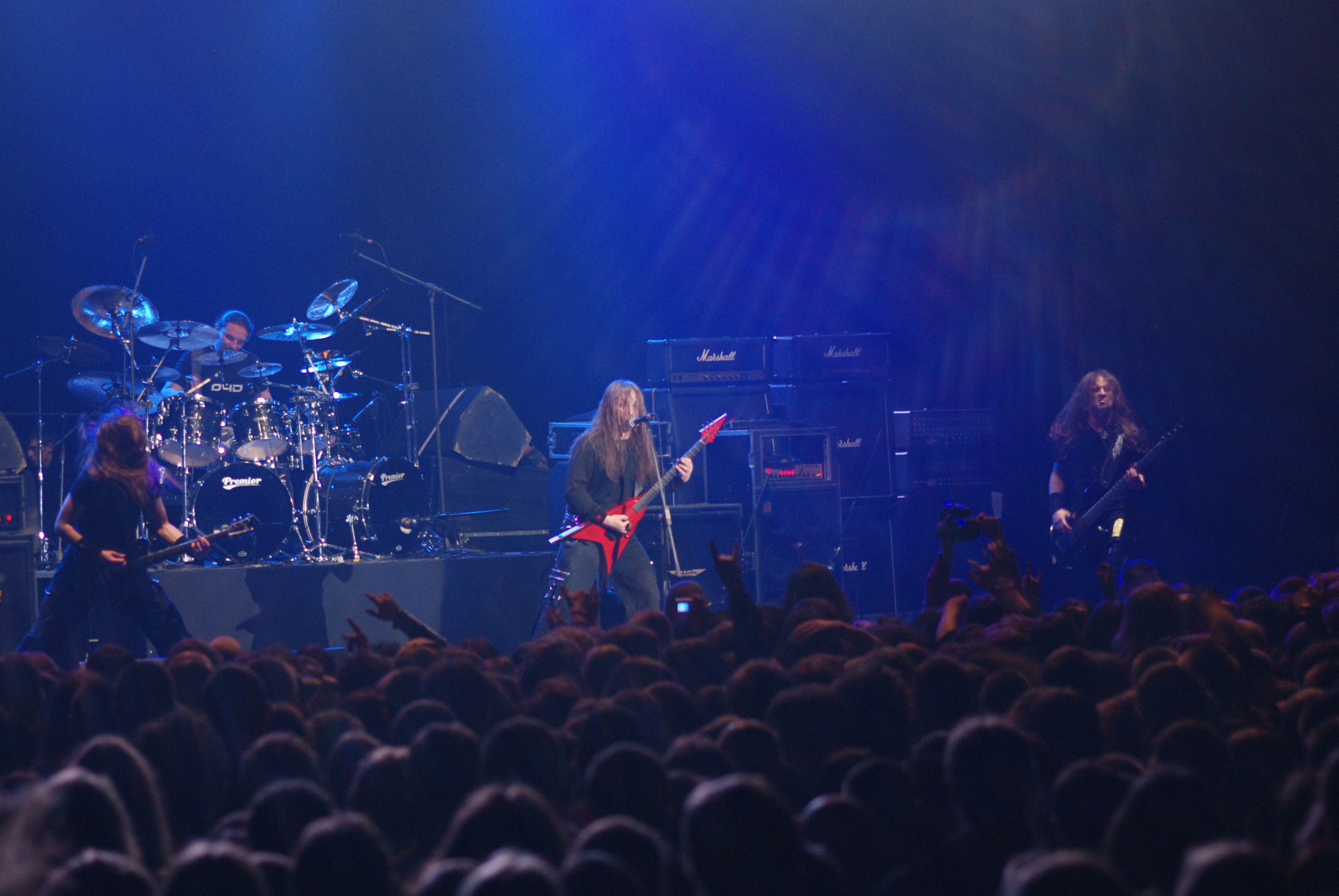
- Vader live at Metalmania 2008
- Studio albums: 12
- Extended plays: 8
- Live albums: 2
- Compilation albums: 2
- Tribute albums: 1
- Singles: 10
- Video albums: 4
- Music videos: 12
- Demos: 3

The discography of Vader, a Polish death metal band, consists of twelve studio albums, two compilation albums, two live albums, eight extended plays, one cover album, four video albums, nine singles, twelve music videos, and three demo albums. Formed in 1983, the group was founded by then bassist Piotr "Peter" Wiwczarek, and guitarist Zbigniew "Vika" Wróblewski.

After release of three demo albums – Live in Decay (1986), Necrolust (1989), and Morbid Reich (1990), Vader was signed to British record label Earache Records. The band's debut album The Ultimate Incantation was released in late 1992, and gained recognition in the death metal scene. It was supported by "Dark Age" music video produced for MTV. Vader's second album, entitled De Profundis, was released in 1995, followed by the 1997 release Black to the Blind. Critically acclaimed albums heave been released by System Shock/Impact Records, back then, the band's main label.

In late 1990s, Vader was signed to Metal Blade Records. The label released in 2000 the band's fourth album Litany, which had sales of around of 45,000 units around the world in three months from its release. The CD also gained positive response in Vader's home country, reaching number 1 on Gazeta Wyborcza bestsellers list. The album was followed by the 2002 release Revelations, and The Beast from 2004, charting 22 and 8 on OLiS, respectively. After signing to Regain Records, Vader released their seventh effort Impressions in Blood in 2006. In 2009, the band made a record deal with Nuclear Blast, the company that released Vader's eighth album Necropolis (2009).

Band's last ninth album entitled Welcome to the Morbid Reich was released in 2011, and it is probably Vader's biggest commercial success to date. The album reached number 17 on the Billboard Top New Artist Albums (Heatseekers), and number 25 on the Hard Rock Albums. In Poland, Welcome to the Morbid Reich landed at number 6, and dropped out four weeks later. The release also charted in France, Japan, Switzerland, and Germany.

== Studio albums ==
List of studio albums, with selected chart positions
Title	Album details	Peak chart positions							Sales
Title	Album details	POL	JPN	GER	FRA	SWI	US Heat	US Hard	Sales
The Ultimate Incantation	Released: 16 November 1992; Label: Earache, Relativity, Carnage, Toy's Factory; Formats: CS, CD, LP, digital download	1	—	—	—	—	—	—	
De Profundis	Released: 5 September 1995; Label: System Shock, Croon, Metal Mind, Pavement Music, Avalon Marquee; Formats: CS, CD	3	—	91	—	—	—	—	POL: 17,000+
Black to the Blind	Released: 13 October 1997; Label: System Shock, Koch, Pavement Music, Avalon Marquee; Formats: CS, CD, LP	86	—	—	—	—	—	—	
Litany	Released: 22 March 2000; Label: Metal Blade, Metal Mind, Avalon Marquee; Formats: CS, CD, digital download	6	—	—	—	—	—	—	US: 8,000+
Revelations	Released: 22 May 2002; Label: Metal Blade, Metal Mind, Avalon Marquee; Formats: CS, CD, LP, digital download	22	—	—	—	—	—	—	
The Beast	Released: 8 September 2004; Label: Metal Blade, Metal Mind, Avalon Marquee; Formats: CD, 2CD, CD+DVD, LP, digital download	8	207	—	—	—	—	—	
Impressions in Blood	Released: 23 August 2006; Label: Regain, Candlelight, Mystic, Avalon Marquee; Formats: CD, 2CD, LP, digital download	8	265	—	—	—	—	—	
Necropolis	Released: 21 August 2009; Label: Nuclear Blast, Avalon Marquee; Formats: CD, CD+DVD, LP, digital download	5	—	64	188	—	36	—	US: 1,100+
Welcome to the Morbid Reich	Released: 12 August 2011; Label: Nuclear Blast, Avalon Marquee; Formats: CD, LP, digital download	6	233	73	154	94	17	25	US: 2,000+
Tibi et Igni	Released: 30 May 2014; Label: Nuclear Blast, Avalon Marquee; Formats: CD, LP, digital download	16	183	55	145	63	18	—	US: 2,000+
The Empire	Released: 4 November 2016; Label: Nuclear Blast, Avalon Marquee; Formats: CD, LP, digital download	29	252	—	—	—	17	21	US: 1,100+
Solitude in Madness	Released: 1 May 2020; Label: Nuclear Blast, Avalon Marquee; Formats: CD, LP, digital download	2	155	41	—	—	—	—	US: 2200+
"—" denotes a recording that did not chart or was not released in that territory.

== Cover albums ==
List of cover albums
Title	Album details
Future of the Past	Released: 3 December 1996; Label: System Shock, Koch, Avalon Marquee, Pavement Music; Formats: CS, CD
Future of the Past II - Hell in the East	Released: 14 December 2015; Label: Witching Hour Productions; Formats: CD, LP

== Live albums ==
List of live albums
Title	Album details
The Darkest Age: Live '93	Released: 27 July 1994; Label: Baron, Arctic Serenades, System Shock, Metal Mind, Pavement Music; Formats: CS, CD
Live in Japan	Released: 30 December 1998; Label: System Shock, ZYX Music, Avalon Marquee, Metal Mind, Pavement Music; Formats: CS, CD

== Compilations ==
List of compilation albums
Title	Album details
Reborn in Chaos	Released: 1996; Label: Baron, Metal Mind, Hammerheart, Pavement Music; Formats: CD, 12" vinyl, cassette, digital download

== Rerecorded ==
List of compilation albums
Title	Album details
XXV	Released: 28 May 2008; Label: Regain, Mystic, Avalon Marquee; Formats: 2CD, 2CD+DVD, digital download
Dark Age	Released: 28 February 2018; Label: Witching Hour Productions; Formats: CD, 12" vinyl, cassette, digital download

== EPs ==
List of EPs, with selected chart positions
Title	Album details	Peak chart positions
Title	Album details	POL
Sothis	Released: 1994; Label: Baron, Repulse, Metal Mind; Formats: CS, CD, LP	26
Kingdom	Released: 10 November 1998; Label: System Shock, Pavement Music, Metal Mind, Avalon Marquee; Formats: CS, CD	—
Reign Forever World	Released: 16 December 2000; Label: Metal Blade, Metal Mind, Avalon Marquee; Formats: CS, CD, LP	45
Blood	Released: 22 September 2003; Label: Metal Blade, Metal Mind, Avalon Marquee; Formats: CS, CD	44
The Art of War	Released: 14 November 2005; Label: Regain, Candlelight, Avalon Marquee; Formats: CD, LP, digital download	—
Lead Us	Released: 22 January 2008; Label: Regain; Formats: CD	—
The Upcoming Chaos	Released: 30 August 2008; Label: Regain; Formats: CD	—
Go To Hell	Released: 18 April 2014; Label: Nuclear Blast; Formats: 7" LP	—
Iron Times	Released: 12 April 2016; Label: Nuclear Blast; Formats: 7" LP	—
Thy Messenger	Released: 31 May 2019; Label: Nuclear Blast; Formats: CD, Digital, 12" vinyl	—
Humanihility	Released: 30 May 2025; Label: Nuclear Blast; Formats: Digital, 12" vinyl	—
"—" denotes a recording that did not chart or was not released in that territory.

== Video albums ==
List of video albums
Title	Album details	Note
Vision and Voice	Released: 1 December 1998; Label: Metal Mind; Formats: VHS	
More Vision and the Voice	Released: 3 June 2002; Label: Metal Mind; Formats: DVD	Vision and Voice re-release
Night of the Apocalypse	Released: 25 October 2004; Label: Metal Mind; Formats: DVD	
And Blood Was Shed in Warsaw	Released: 8 October 2007; Label: Metal Mind; Formats: DVD+CD	

== Singles ==
Year	Title	Album	Note
1995	"An Act of Darkness / I.F.Y."	De Profundis	
1997	"Carnal / Black to the Blind"	Black to the Blind	Thrash'em All magazine insert
2000	"Xeper / North"	Litany	Thrash'em All magazine insert
2002	"Angel of Death"	Revelations	Thrash'em All magazine insert
2004	"Beware the Beast"	The Beast	Thrash'em All magazine insert
2008	"v.666"	XXV	Thrash'em All magazine insert
2009	"We Are the Horde"	Necropolis	iTunes single
2009	"Nile / Vader"	Necropolis	7" split single
2011	"Come and See My Sacrifice"	Welcome to the Morbid Reich	iTunes single
2014	"Where Angels Weep"	Tibi et Igni	iTunes single

2020 Shock and Awe

== Demos ==
List of demos
Title	Album details	Sales
Live in Decay	Released: 6 December 1986; Label: self-released; Formats: CS	
Necrolust	Released: March 1989; Label: self-released; Formats: CS	
Morbid Reich	Released: July 1990; Label: Carnage Records; Formats: CS	POL: 5,000+

== Other appearances ==
Year	Title	Album	Ref.
1996	"Silent Scream"	Slatanic Slaughter II – A Tribute to Slayer	
1996	"Wyrocznia"	Czarne Zastępy: W Hołdzie Kat	
2000	"Freezing Moon"	Originators of the Northern Darkness – A Tribute to Mayhem	
2002	"Immortal Rites"	Tyrants from the Abyss: A Tribute to Morbid Angel	
2004	"Death Metal"	Seven Gates of Horror – A Tribute to Possessed	

== Music videos ==
Year	Title	Directed	Album	Ref.
1993	"Dark Age"	Kimmo Kuusniemi, Tanja Katinka	The Ultimate Incantations	
1996	"Incarnation"	—	De Profundis	
1998	"Kingdom"	—	Kingdom	
2000	"Cold Demons"	Adam Kuc, Selani Studio	Litany	
2002	"Epitaph"	—	Revelations	
2004	"Dark Transmission"	Wojciech Głodek	The Beast	
2004	"Choices"	Wojciech Głodek	The Beast	
2005	"This Is the War"	Arkadiusz Jurcan	The Art of War	
2006	"Helleluyah!!! (God Is Dead)"	Andrzej Wyrozębski, Inbornmedia	Impressions in Blood	
2007	"Sword of the Witcher"	Inbornmedia	Wiedźmin: Muzyka Inspirowana Grą (Music Inspired By The Witcher)	
2008	"Carnal"	Carlos Abysmo	XXV	
2009	"Never Say My Name"	Inbornmedia	Necropolis	
2016	"Reborn In Flames"	-	Before The Age of Chaos – Live 2015	-
