= XXV (Vader album) =

2008 studio album by Vader

- Cover art by Jacek Wiśniewski

Studio album of re-recorded songs by Vader
- Released: 28 May 2008
- Recorded: July 2007 – March 2008, Hertz Studio, Białystok
- Genre: Death metal, thrash metal
- Length: 96:00 / 112:00
- Language: English, Polish
- Label: Regain, Mystic, Avalon Marquee
- Producer: Wojtek and Sławek Wiesławscy

Vader chronology
Impressions in Blood (2006)	XXV (2008)	Necropolis (2009)

Singles from XXV
- 1. "v.666" Released: 15 January 2008

Professional ratings
Review scores
Source	Rating
About.com	4/5 stars
AllMusic	3.5/5 stars
Blabbermouth	8/10 stars
Teraz Rock	4/5 stars

XXV is the 25th-anniversary studio album by Polish death metal band Vader, released in 2008 by Regain Records. The album is a collection of re-recorded songs from earlier Vader albums, from The Ultimate Incantation up to The Beast. The special edition includes three bonus tracks and a bonus third DVD, with an old and rare live VHS containing footage from throughout the band's career. XXV was recorded between July 2007 and March 2008 at Hertz Studio in Białystok, Poland and produced by Wojtek and Sławek Wiesławscy. The album is the last Vader release that features guitarist Maurycy "Mauser" Stefanowicz and drummer Dariusz "Daray" Brzozowski, and the only studio recording with bassist Marcin "Novy" Nowak.

The release was preceded by the single "v.666", issued on 15 January 2008. A music video was shot for the song "Carnal", directed by Carlos Abysmo.

== Track listing ==
Disc 1
No.	Title	Lyrics	Music	Album	Length
1.	"inVADERs (Intro)" (instrumental)		Krzysztof Oloś		1:38
2.	"Chaos"	Paweł Wasilewski	Piotr Wiwczarek	The Ultimate Incantation	4:16
3.	"Vicious Circle"	Paweł Wasilewski	Piotr Wiwczarek	The Ultimate Incantation	2:37
4.	"Crucified Ones"	Piotr Wiwczarek	Piotr Wiwczarek	The Ultimate Incantation	3:18
5.	"Dark Age"	Piotr Wiwczarek	Piotr Wiwczarek	The Ultimate Incantation	4:31
6.	"Reign-Carrion"	Piotr Wiwczarek	Piotr Wiwczarek	The Ultimate Incantation	6:32
7.	"Silent Empire"	Paweł Frelik	Piotr Wiwczarek	De Profundis	4:13
8.	"Sothis"	Paweł Wasilewski	Piotr Wiwczarek	De Profundis	3:26
9.	"Incarnation"	Paweł Wasilewski	Piotr Wiwczarek	De Profundis	3:05
10.	"Reborn in Flames" (featuring Seth Van De Loo)	Piotr Wiwczarek	Piotr Wiwczarek	De Profundis	4:52
11.	"Blood of Kingu"	Piotr Wiwczarek	Piotr Wiwczarek	De Profundis	4:33
12.	"Carnal"	Paweł Frelik	Piotr Wiwczarek	Black to the Blind	2:09
13.	"Fractal Light"	Paweł Frelik	Piotr Wiwczarek	Black to the Blind	2:41
14.	"Red Passage"	Piotr Wiwczarek	Piotr Wiwczarek	Black to the Blind	2:46
15.	"Black to the Blind"	Paweł Wasilewski	Piotr Wiwczarek	Black to the Blind	4:03

Disc 2
No.	Title	Lyrics	Music	Album	Length
1.	"Kingdom"	Tomasz Krajewski	Piotr Wiwczarek	Kingdom	3:21
2.	"Wings"	Paweł Frelik	Piotr Wiwczarek	Litany	3:06
3.	"Xeper"	Paweł Frelik	Piotr Wiwczarek	Litany	3:49
4.	"Cold Demons"	Piotr Wiwczarek	Piotr Wiwczarek	Litany	2:10
5.	"Final Massacre"	Paweł Wasilewski	Piotr Wiwczarek	Necrolust	4:23
6.	"Reign Forever World"	Łukasz Szurmiński	Piotr Wiwczarek	Reign Forever World	3:56
7.	"Epitaph"	Łukasz Szurmiński	Piotr Wiwczarek	Revelations	3:55
8.	"Dark Transmission"	Paweł Frelik	Piotr Wiwczarek	The Beast	4:34
9.	"Fear of Napalm" (Terrorizer cover; featuring Tomasz "Hal" Halicki, Robert "Pierścień" Pierściński)	Oscar Garcia, Jesse Pintado, David Vincent, Pete Sandoval	Oscar Garcia, Jesse Pintado, David Vincent, Pete Sandoval	Future of the Past	2:59
10.	"Wyrocznia" (KAT cover; featuring Roman Kostrzewski)	Roman Kostrzewski	Roman Kostrzewski, Piotr Luczyk, Wojciech Mrowiec, Ireneusz Loth, Tomasz Jaguś	Future of the Past	3:24
11.	"Tyrani Piekieł"	Piotr Wiwczarek	Piotr Wiwczarek	Live In Decay	4:48

Disc 2 Bonus Tracks
No.	Title	Lyrics	Music	Album	Length
12.	"Trupi Jad"	Piotr Wiwczarek	Piotr Wiwczarek	Live In Decay	6:33
13.	"Reborn in Flames (V.Panzer)"	Piotr Wiwczarek	Piotr Wiwczarek	Necrolust	4:57
14.	"Dark(er) Transmission(er) (V.999)"	Paweł Frelik	Piotr Wiwczarek	The Beast	4:36

Special edition DVD
No.	Title	Lyrics	Music	Recorded	Length
1.	"Gin Psie"	Piotr Wiwczarek	Piotr Wiwczarek	Olsztyn, 1986	3:03
2.	"Trupi Jad"	Piotr Wiwczarek	Piotr Wiwczarek	Białystok, 1989	6:43
3.	"Vicious Circle"	Paweł Wasilewski	Piotr Wiwczarek	Moscow, 1990	3:06
4.	"Demons Wind/Decapitated Saints"	Piotr Wiwczarek	Piotr Wiwczarek	Białystok, 1992	6:56
5.	"Intro/Dark Age"	Piotr Wiwczarek	Piotr Wiwczarek	Piekary Śląskie, 1992	6:04
6.	"Breath of Centuries"	Paweł Wasilewski	Piotr Wiwczarek	Warsaw, 1992	4:23
7.	"Chaos"	Paweł Wasilewski	Piotr Wiwczarek	Groningen, 1993	4:35
8.	"Decapitated Saints"	Piotr Wiwczarek	Piotr Wiwczarek	Brooklyn, New York, 1993	2:50
9.	"Reign-Carrion"	Piotr Wiwczarek	Piotr Wiwczarek	Łódź, 1993	6:31
10.	"Blood of Kingu"	Piotr Wiwczarek	Piotr Wiwczarek	Turin, 1995	4:30
11.	"Crucified Ones"	Piotr Wiwczarek	Piotr Wiwczarek	Sopot, 1995	3:55
12.	"Testimony"	Piotr Wiwczarek	Piotr Wiwczarek	Hamburg, 1996	3:42
13.	"Black to the Blind/Silent Empire"	Paweł Wasilewski/Paweł Frelik	Piotr Wiwczarek	Madrid, 1998	8:11
14.	"Distant Dream"	Tomasz Krajewski	Piotr Wiwczarek	Stolzenhain, Schönewalde 1998	2:47
15.	"Forwards to Die/North"	Piotr Wiwczarek	Piotr Wiwczarek	Houston, 2000	3:50
16.	"Sothis"	Paweł Wasilewski	Piotr Wiwczarek	Essen, 2001	4:06

== Personnel ==
Production and performance credits are adapted from the album liner notes.

Vader

- Piotr "Peter" Wiwczarek − lead vocals, lead guitar, bass, lyrics, executive producer
- Maurycy "Mauser" Stefanowicz − rhythm guitar, backing vocals
- Marcin "Novy" Nowak − bass, backing vocals
- Dariusz "Daray" Brzozowski − drums

Additional musicians

- Krzysztof "Siegmar" Oloś (Vesania) – guest keyboards
- Roman Kostrzewski (KAT) – guest vocals
- Robert "Pierścień" Pierściński (Dead Infection) – guest vocals
- Seth Van De Loo (Severe Torture) – guest vocals
- Tomasz "Hal" Halicki (Hermh) – guest bass

Production

- Paweł Wasilewski – lyrics
- Paweł Frelik – lyrics
- Tomasz Krajewski – lyrics
- Łukasz Szurmiński – lyrics
- Jacek Wiśniewski – cover art
- Sławomir & Wojciech Wiesławscy – production, mastering, mixing
- Agnieszka Krysiuk – photos
- Massive Music Management – management

Note

- Recorded, mixed and mastered at Hertz Studio July 2007 – March 2008.

== v.666 ==
v.666 is the sixth single by the Polish death metal band Vader. It was released only in Poland on 15 January 2008 by Empire Records. The release features two songs "Carnal (v.666 Version)", and "Vicious Circle (v.666 Version)".

=== Track listing ===
No.	Title	Lyrics	Music	Length
1.	"Carnal" (v.666 Version)	Paweł Frelik	Piotr Wiwczarek	2:09
2.	"Vicious Circle" (v.666 Version)	Paweł Wasilewski	Piotr Wiwczarek	2:36

== Release history ==
Region	Date	Label
Japan	28 May 2008	Avalon Marquee
Poland	16 June 2008	Mystic Production
Europe	18 June 2008	Regain Records
