= Kingdom (EP) =

- Cover art by Jacek Wiśniewski

EP by Vader
- Released: 21 August 1998
- Recorded: 1997–1998, Selani Studio, Olsztyn, 2.47 Studio, Warsaw
- Genre: Death metal
- Length: 53:24
- Label: Metal Mind Productions, System Shock/Impact Records, Pavement Music, Avalon Marquee
- Producer: Piotr "Peter" Wiwczarek

Vader chronology
Black to the Blind (1997)	Kingdom (1998)	Litany (2000)

Professional ratings
Review scores
Source	Rating
Chronicles of Chaos	8.5/10 stars

Kingdom is an EP by the Polish death metal band Vader. It was released on 21 August 1998 in Japan by Avalon Marquee, and in United States, Europe, and Poland on 10 November 1998 via Pavement Music, Metal Mind, and System Shock/Impact Records.

Kingdom was recorded, and mixed in July, August, and December 1997, and February 1998 at Selani Studio in Olsztyn, and 2.47 Studio in Warsaw. Enhanced track contains PC CD-ROM Data track with video for "Incarnation" in Video For Windows format, encoded using four different quality settings. Piotr "Peter" Wiwczarek talked about remixes on the album, saying:

To be honest, we had to do it because nobody wanted to release the album with like fifteen minutes total time. So, we had a couple of remixes made with different friends and there was even an idea to make a full album just with remixes, but we found out it's not a good idea, we don't need it. We're Vader and... it's not good. It's not bad to put two songs as bonus tracks, to kind of experience something, but nothing more, I guess.

== Track listing ==
No.	Title	Lyrics	Music	Length
1.	"Enhanced Track (Incarnation)" (PC CD-ROM Data track)	Paweł Wasilewski	Piotr Wiwczarek	24:35
2.	"Creatures Of Light And Darkness"	Paweł Frelik	Piotr Wiwczarek	3:21
3.	"Breath Of Centuries"	Paweł Wasilewski	Piotr Wiwczarek	4:34
4.	"Kingdom"	Tomasz Krajewski	Piotr Wiwczarek	3:05
5.	"Anamnesis"	Paweł Wasilewski	Piotr Wiwczarek	3:05
6.	"Inhuman Disaster Mix /Inspired By Heading For Internal Darkness/" (remixed by 2.47 Production Team)	Paweł Frelik	Piotr Wiwczarek	7:17
7.	"Quicksilver Blood Mix /Inspired By Carnal/" (remixed by DoctorDrum)	Paweł Wasilewski	Piotr Wiwczarek	7:23

Japanese Bonus Track
No.	Title	Lyrics	Music	Length
5.	"Black To The Blind"	Paweł Wasilewski	Piotr Wiwczarek	7:12

== Personnel ==
Production and performance credits are adapted from the album liner notes.

Vader

- Piotr "Peter" Wiwczarek – rhythm guitar, lead guitar, bass guitar, lead vocals, producer, lyrics
- Maurycy "Mauser" Stefanowicz – rhythm guitar, lead guitar
- Leszek "Shambo" Rakowski – bass guitar (credited, did not perform)
- Krzysztof "Doc/DoctorDrum" Raczkowski – drums, remix

Production

- Tomasz Krajewski – lyrics
- Paweł Wasilewski – lyrics
- Paweł Frelik – lyrics
- Andrzej "Any" Bomba – sound engineering
- Jacek Wiśniewski – cover art and design
- Mariusz Kmiołek – concept design, management
- Michał Pasich – photos
- Grzegorz Piwkowski – mastering
- 2.47 Production Team (Bogusław Pezda, Sławomir Leniart) – remix
- Takahisa Okuno – Japanese liner notes

Note

- Tracks 1 & 2 recorded at Selani Studio, Olsztyn, February 1998.
- Track 3 recorded at Selani Studio, Olsztyn, December 1997.
- Track 4 recorded at Selani Studio, Olsztyn, July and August 1997.
- Track 5 remixed at 2.47 Studio, Warsaw, February 1998.
- Track 6 remixed at Selani Studio, Olsztyn, February 1998.

== Release history ==
Region	Date	Label
USA, Poland, Europe	10 November 1998	Pavement Music, Metal Mind Productions, System Shock/Impact Records
Japan	21 August 1998	Avalon Marquee
