= Sothis (EP) =

- Cover art by Krzysztof Lutostański

EP by Vader
- Released: 1994
- Recorded: March 1994 at Modern Sound Studio in Gdynia and March 1994 at W. Świech Studio in Olsztyn for tracks 1, 3, and 6
- Genre: Death metal
- Length: 23:43
- Label: Baron Records, Repulse Records, Metal Mind Productions, Night Of The Vinyl Dead Records, Witching Hour Productions
- Producer: Tomasz Bonarowski, Vader, Mariusz Kmiołek

Vader chronology
The Darkest Age (1994)	Sothis (1994)	De Profundis (1995)

Professional ratings
Review scores
Source	Rating
AllMusic	3.5/5 stars
Chronicles of Chaos	4/10 stars

Sothis is an EP by the Polish death metal band Vader. It was released in 1994 by Baron Records. Tracks 2 and 4 appear on their next release, De Profundis, and track 7 appears on Vader's tribute album Future of the Past.

== Track listing ==
No.	Title	Lyrics	Music	Length
1.	"Hymn to the Ancient Ones"		Piotr Wiwczarek	1:52
2.	"Sothis"	Paweł Wasilewski	Piotr Wiwczarek	3:45
3.	"De Profundis" (instrumental)		Piotr Wiwczarek	1:31
4.	"Vision and the Voice"	Paweł Wasilewski	Piotr Wiwczarek	3:26
5.	"The Wrath"	Piotr Wiwczarek	Piotr Wiwczarek	4:54
6.	"R'Lyeh" (instrumental)		Piotr Wiwczarek	1:53
7.	"Black Sabbath" (Black Sabbath cover)	Ozzy Osbourne	Ozzy Osbourne, Tony Iommi, Geezer Butler, Bill Ward	6:19
Total length:				23:43

2012 re-release bonus tracks
No.	Title	Lyrics	Music	Length
8.	"Dark Age" (live, Jarocin 1994)	Piotr Wiwczarek	Piotr Wiwczarek	4:36
9.	"Testimony" (live, Jarocin 1994)	Piotr Wiwczarek	Piotr Wiwczarek	3:34
10.	"Vicious Circle" (live, Jarocin 1994)	Paweł Wasilewski	Piotr Wiwczarek	2:59
11.	"Crucified Ones" (live, Jarocin 1994)	Piotr Wiwczarek	Piotr Wiwczarek	3:29
12.	"The Wrath" (live, Jarocin 1994)	Piotr Wiwczarek	Piotr Wiwczarek	4:21
13.	"Sothis" (live, Jarocin 1994)	Paweł Wasilewski	Piotr Wiwczarek	3:28
14.	"Raining Blood" (live, Jarocin 1994; Slayer cover)	Jeff Hanneman, Kerry King	Jeff Hanneman	3:31

== Personnel ==
Production and performance credits are adapted from the album liner notes.

Vader

- Piotr "Peter" Wiwczarek – lead vocals, rhythm guitar, lead guitar, bass guitar
- Jarosław "China" Łabieniec – rhythm guitar, lead guitar
- Krzysztof "Doc/Docent" Raczkowski – drums

Session musician

- Grzegorz Skawiński – guitar (Black Sabbath)

Other

- Leszek "Shambo" Rakowski – bass guitar (credited, did not perform)

Production

- Tomasz "Tom" Bonarowski – sound engineering, mixing, producer
- Krzysztof Lutostański – cover painting
- Jan Polakowski – computer design
- Mariusz Kmiołek – executive producer, management
- Marcin Ograbek – sound engineering assistant
- Wojtek & Sławek Wiesławscy – remastering
- Zbigniew Bielak – layout (re-release)

Note

- Tracks 2, 4, 5, 7 recorded and mixed at Modern Sound Studio, Gdynia, March 1994.
- Tracks 1, 3, 6 recorded and mixed at W. Świech Studio, Olsztyn, March 1994.

== Release history ==
Formats	Region	Date	Label
CS, CD	Poland	1994	Baron Records
CD	Spain	1995	Repulse Records
CS, CD	Poland	1998	Metal Mind Productions
CD	Poland	29 August 2006	Metal Mind Productions
LP	Italy	23 June 2012	Night of the Vinyl Dead Records
CD	Poland	27 November 2012	Witching Hour Productions
