= The Darkest Age: Live '93 =

- Cover art by Jacek Wiśniewski

Live album by Vader
- Released: 27 July 1994
- Recorded: 13 December 1993
- Venue: Hala TS Wisła
- Studio: Corona Hall in Kraków, Poland
- Genre: Death metal
- Length: 51:07
- Language: English, Polish
- Label: Baron Records, Arctic Serenades, System Shock/Impact Records, Metal Mind Records, Pavement Music
- Producer: Vader & Mariusz Kmiołek

Vader chronology
The Ultimate Incantation (1992)	The Darkest Age: Live '93 (1994)	De Profundis (1995)

Alternative cover
- alternative cover art

Professional ratings
Review scores
Source	Rating
AllMusic	2.5/5 stars

The Darkest Age: Live '93 is a live album by the Polish death metal band Vader. It was recorded at TS Wisła Sports Hall in Kraków on 13 December 1993 and was originally released on Baron Records in 1994 in cassette format.

== Track listing ==
No.	Title	Lyrics	Music	Length
1.	"Macbeth (Intro)" (instrumental)		Laibach	3:54
2.	"Dark Age"	Piotr Wiwczarek	Piotr Wiwczarek	4:43
3.	"Vicious Circle"	Paweł Wasilewski	Piotr Wiwczarek	3:13
4.	"The Crucified Ones"	Piotr Wiwczarek	Piotr Wiwczarek	3:11
5.	"Demon's Wind"		Piotr Wiwczarek	5:01
6.	"Decapitated Saints"	Piotr Wiwczarek	Piotr Wiwczarek	2:31
7.	"From Beyond (Intro)" (instrumental)		Piotr Wiwczarek	1:01
8.	"Chaos"	Paweł Wasilewski	Piotr Wiwczarek	4:57
9.	"Reign-Carrion"	Piotr Wiwczarek	Piotr Wiwczarek	7:17
10.	"Testimony"	Piotr Wiwczarek	Piotr Wiwczarek	4:10
11.	"Breath of Centuries"	Paweł Wasilewski	Piotr Wiwczarek	4:23
12.	"Omen (Intro)" (instrumental)		Jerry Goldsmith	2:08
13.	"Hell Awaits" (Slayer cover)	Kerry King	Jeff Hanneman, Kerry King	4:41

Japanese edition bonus tracks
No.	Title	Lyrics	Music	Length
14.	"Hymn to the Ancient Ones"		Piotr Wiwczarek	1:52
15.	"Sothis"	Paweł Wasilewski	Piotr Wiwczarek	3:45
16.	"De Profundis" (instrumental)		Piotr Wiwczarek	1:31
17.	"Vision and the Voice"	Paweł Wasilewski	Piotr Wiwczarek	3:26
18.	"The Wrath"	Piotr Wiwczarek	Piotr Wiwczarek	4:54
19.	"R'Lyeh" (instrumental)		Piotr Wiwczarek	1:53
20.	"Black Sabbath" (Black Sabbath cover)	Geezer Butler	Ozzy Osbourne, Tony Iommi, Geezer Butler, Bill Ward	6:19

== Personnel ==
Production and performance credits are adapted from the album liner notes.

Vader

- Piotr "Peter" Wiwczarek – lead vocals, rhythm guitar, lead guitar
- Jarosław "China" Łabieniec – rhythm guitar, lead guitar
- Jacek "Jackie" Kalisz – bass guitar
- Krzysztof "Docent" Raczkowski – drums

Production

- Jacek Wiśniewski – cover art
- Jan Polakowski – alternative cover art
- Marcin Ograbek – engineering
- Mariusz Kmiołek – management
- A. Belica – photos

Note

- Recorded at Corona Hall, Kraków, Poland, 13 December 1993

== Release history ==
Region	Date	Label
Poland	27 July 1994	Baron Records
Europe	1996	Arctic Serenades
Europe	18 March 1998	System Shock/Impact Records
US	27 July 1999	Pavement Music
Japan	23 March 2000	Avalon Marquee
Poland	20 February 2007	Metal Mind Productions
