= Blood (EP) =

- Cover art by Jacek Wiśniewski

EP by Vader
- Released: 22 September 2003
- Recorded: RG Studio, Gdańsk, July 2003; Red Studio, Gdańsk, February–March 2002
- Genre: Death metal
- Length: 26:56
- Label: Metal Blade, Metal Mind, Avalon Marquee
- Producer: Piotr "Peter" Wiwczarek

Vader chronology
Revelations (2002)	Blood (2003)	The Beast (2004)

Professional ratings
Review scores
Source	Rating
Teraz Rock	3.5/5 stars
Exclaim!	favorable

Blood is an EP by the Polish death metal band Vader. It was released on 22 September 2003 in Europe via Metal Blade, and day after in Poland by Metal Mind. Japanese edition was released on 22 October 2003 by Avalon Marquee.

Tracks 1–2 were recorded and mixed in July 2003 at RG Studio in Gdańsk, Poland. Mastering took place at RG Studio in Gdańsk, Poland. Tracks 3–7 were recorded and mixed between February and March 2002 at Red Studio in Gdańsk, Poland during Revelations (2002) sessions, and mastered at Studio 333 in Częstochowa, Poland.

This is the last release with drummer Krzysztof Raczkowski, the first one with Marcin Nowak as bass player (without performing on the tracks), and featuring Jacek Hiro's performance, it is the only release with the participation of all members from Dies Irae.

== Track listing ==
No.	Title	Lyrics	Music	Length
1.	"Shape-Shifting"	Paweł Frelik	Piotr Wiwczarek	4:49
2.	"We Wait"	Paweł Frelik	Piotr Wiwczarek	3:53
3.	"As The Fallen Rise"	Piotr Wiwczarek	Piotr Wiwczarek	2:11
4.	"Son Of Fire"	Piotr Wiwczarek	Piotr Wiwczarek	2:09
5.	"Traveler"	Łukasz Szurmiński	Piotr Wiwczarek	2:06
6.	"When Darkness Calls"	Łukasz Szurmiński	Piotr Wiwczarek	5:16
7.	"Angel of Death" (Thin Lizzy cover; featuring Jacek Hiro)	Phil Lynott, Darren Wharton	Phil Lynott, Darren Wharton	6:33
Total length:				26:56

Japanese Bonus Track
No.	Title	Lyrics	Music	Length
8.	"Immortal Rites" (Morbid Angel cover)	David Vincent	Trey Azagthoth, David Vincent	3:59

== Personnel ==
Production and performance credits are adapted from the album liner notes.

Vader

- Piotr "Peter" Wiwczarek – lead vocals, rhythm guitar, lead guitar, bass guitar, production
- Maurycy "Mauser" Stefanowicz – lead guitar
- Marcin "Novy" Nowak – bass guitar (credited, did not perform)
- Krzysztof "Doc" Raczkowski – drums

Additional musicians

- Jacek Hiro (Sceptic) – lead guitar
- Jerzy "U.reck" Głód (Lux Occulta) – keyboards

Production

- Jacek Wiśniewski – cover art
- Piotr Łukaszewski – sound engineer
- Massive Management – management
- Bartek Kuźniak – mastering (tracks: 3–7)
- Michał Mielnik – mastering (tracks: 1–2)

Note

- Tracks 1–2 Recorded & mixed at RG Studio, Gdańsk, July 2003.
- Mastered at RG Studio, Gdańsk.
- Tracks 3–7 Recorded & mixed at Red Studio, Gdańsk, February/March 2002.
- Mastered at Studio 333, Częstochowa.

== Charts ==
=== Weekly ===
Chart (2001)	Peak position
Polish Albums Chart	44

=== Monthly ===
Chart (2001)	Peak position
Poland (ZPAV Top 100)	31

== Release history ==
Region	Date	Label
Europe	22 September 2003	Metal Blade Records
Poland	23 September 2003	Metal Mind Productions
Japan	22 October 2003	Avalon Marquee
