= Vision and Voice =

Video by Vader
- Released: 1 December 1998
- Recorded: Studio Łęg, Kraków, Poland, 25 March 1998
- Genre: Death metal
- Language: English, Polish
- Label: Metal Mind
- Producer: Maria Miodunka, Tomasz Pomarański, Tomasz Dziubiński (executive)

Vader chronology
Vision and Voice (1998)	Night of the Apocalypse (2004)

Alternative cover
- More Vision and the Voice cover art

Professional ratings
Review scores
Source	Rating
AllMusic	2.5/5 stars

Vision and Voice is the first live performance recording by Polish death metal band Vader. It was released in VHS format on 1 December 1998 by Metal Mind. The album consists Vader concert filmed and recorded on 25 March 1998 at Studio Łęg in Kraków, Poland.

The DVD edition entitled More Vision and the Voice was released on 3 June 2002 by Metal Mind. Apart from main concert recorded in Kraków the re-release includes tree video-clips, eight bootleg live tracks from No Mercy Festival 2001, interview with Piotr "Peter" Wiwczarek, band and individual members biographies, discography, photo gallery, desktop images, art gallery, and weblinks. The release was remastered, and converted to Dolby Digital 5.1 Surround at Studio 333 in Częstochowa, Poland by Bartłomiej Kuźniak.

== Track listing ==
Main performance
No.	Title	Lyrics	Music	Length
1.	"Omen (Intro)" (instrumental)		Jerry Goldsmith	02:09
2.	"Sothis"	Paweł Wasilewski	Piotr Wiwczarek	03:51
3.	"Distant Dream"	Tomasz Krajewski	Piotr Wiwczarek	02:28
4.	"Silent Empire"	Paweł Frelik	Piotr Wiwczarek	04:05
5.	"Blood of Kingu"	Piotr Wiwczarek	Piotr Wiwczarek	04:40
6.	"Black to the Blind"	Paweł Wasilewski	Piotr Wiwczarek	04:08
7.	"Incarnation"	Paweł Frelik	Piotr Wiwczarek	05:39
8.	"Carnal"	Paweł Frelik	Piotr Wiwczarek	02:09
9.	"Dark Age"	Piotr Wiwczarek	Piotr Wiwczarek	04:46
10.	"Kingdom"	Tomasz Krajewski	Piotr Wiwczarek	03:07
11.	"Foetus God"	Paweł Wasilewski	Piotr Wiwczarek	02:44
12.	"Black Sabbath" (Black Sabbath cover)	Ozzy Osbourne	Ozzy Osbourne, Tony Iommi, Geezer Butler, Bill Ward	06:50
13.	"Red Passage"	Paweł Wasilewski	Piotr Wiwczarek	03:04
14.	"Kingdom" (music video)	Tomasz Krajewski	Piotr Wiwczarek	03:02

Music videos (DVD re-release)
No.	Title	Lyrics	Music	Length
1.	"Incarnation"	Paweł Wasilewski	Piotr Wiwczarek	03:05
2.	"Kingdom"	Tomasz Krajewski	Piotr Wiwczarek	03:02
3.	"Cold Demons"	Piotr Wiwczarek	Piotr Wiwczarek	02:40

No Mercy Festivals 2001 (DVD re-release)
No.	Title	Lyrics	Music	Length
1.	"Intro/Dark Age"	Piotr Wiwczarek	Piotr Wiwczarek	06:05
2.	"Crucified Ones"	Piotr Wiwczarek	Piotr Wiwczarek	03:46
3.	"Carnal"	Paweł Frelik	Piotr Wiwczarek	02:17
4.	"Wings"	Paweł Frelik	Piotr Wiwczarek	03:31
5.	"Red Passage"	Paweł Wasilewski	Piotr Wiwczarek	02:57
6.	"Intro/Xepher"	Paweł Frelik	Piotr Wiwczarek	04:41
7.	"Cold Demons"	Piotr Wiwczarek	Piotr Wiwczarek	02:35
8.	"Blood Of Kingu"	Piotr Wiwczarek	Piotr Wiwczarek	05:06

Other (DVD re-release)
No.	Title	Length
1.	"Interview With Vader's Mainman Peter"	24:14

== Personnel ==
Production and performance credits are adapted from the album liner notes.

Vader

- Piotr "Peter" Wiwczarek – rhythm guitar, lead guitar, lead vocals
- Maurycy "Mauser" Stefanowicz – rhythm guitar, lead guitar
- Leszek "Shambo" Rakowski – bass guitar
- Krzysztof "Doc" Raczkowski – drums

Note

- Filmed and Recorded at Studio Łęg, Kraków, Poland, 25 March 1998
- Stereo Remastering & Conversion to Dolby Digital 5.1 Surround at Studio 333, Częstochowa, Poland

Main Performance Production

- Krzysztof Mierzwiński – sound engineering
- Tommy Dziubiński – executive producer
- Alicja Janowska – vision editing
- Jacek Galica – vision editing
- Maria Miodunka – TV producer
- Tomasz Pomarański – TV producer
- Masmiseim – lighting
- Jeremi Grzywa – lighting director
- Mariusz Kmiołek – management
- Piotr Brzeziński – mixing
- Massive Management – photography
- Metal Hammer – photography
- Grzegorz Policiński – set designer
- Jacek Dybowski – vision mixing
- Janusz Fryc – technician
- Marek Suberniak – technician
- Takt – authoring (DVD)
- Bartłomiej "Bart" Kuźniak – audio remastering and editing (DVD)

== Release history ==
Formats	Region	Date	Label
VHS	Europe	1 December 1998	Metal Mind Productions
DVD	Europe	3 June 2002	Metal Mind Productions
DVD	United States	18 June 2002	MVD
