= Live in Japan (Vader album) =

- Cover art by Jacek Wiśniewski

Live album by Vader
- Released: 30 December 1998
- Recorded: 31 August 1998
- Venue: Club Quattro, Tokyo, Japan
- Genre: Death metal
- Label: System Shock/ZYX Music, Metal Mind, Avalon/Marquee
- Producer: Piotr Wiwczarek

Vader chronology
Black to the Blind (1997)	Live in Japan (1998)	Litany (2000)

Professional ratings
Review scores
Source	Rating
Blabbermouth.net	8/10
Chronicles of Chaos	9/10
Collector's Guide to Heavy Metal	6/10
Teraz Rock	4/5

Live in Japan is a live album by the Polish death metal band Vader. It was released in 1998 by Metal Mind Productions in Poland, System Shock/ZYX Music in Europe, and Pavement Music in United States. The Japanese edition with two bonus tracks was released by Avalon/Marquee.

Live in Japan was recorded at Club Quattro in Tokyo on 31 August 1998 by Sound Creators Inc.. Mastering took place at Selani Studio in Olsztyn, Poland in September 1998, and was made by Andrzej "Andy" Bomba. The album was produced by Piotr "Peter" Wiwczarek, who shared mixing duties with Krzysztof "Docent" Raczkowski, and Tomasz "Tom" Bonarowski.

== Track listing ==
All music is composed by Piotr Wiwczarek, except where indicated.

No.	Title	Lyrics	Music	Length
1.	"Damien (intro)" (instrumental)		Jerry Goldsmith	2:45
2.	"Sothis"	Paweł Wasilewski		3:54
3.	"Distant Dream"	Wiwczarek		3:17
4.	"Black to the Blind"	Wiwczarek		4:14
5.	"Silent Empire"	Paweł Frelik		4:09
6.	"Blood of Kingu"	Wiwczarek		4:39
7.	"Carnal"	Frelik		2:23
8.	"Red Passage"	Wasilewski		2:48
9.	"Panzerstoss (intro)" (instrumental)			1:21
10.	"Reborn in Flames"	Wiwczarek		5:05
11.	"Fractal Light"	Frelik		2:44
12.	"From Beyond (intro)" (instrumental)			0:59
13.	"Crucified Ones"	Wiwczarek		3:23
14.	"Foetus God"	Paweł Wasilewski		3:00
15.	"Black Sabbath" (Black Sabbath cover)	Ozzy Osbourne	Osbourne, Tony Iommi, Geezer Butler, Bill Ward	6:18
16.	"Raining Blood" (Slayer cover)	Jeff Hanneman, Kerry King	Hanneman	3:47
17.	"Omen (intro)" (instrumental)		Goldsmith	1:40
18.	"Dark Age"	Wiwczarek		4:59

Japanese edition bonus tracks
No.	Title	Lyrics	Music	Length
7.	"Incarnation"	Wasilewski		3:09
13.	"Dethroned Emperor" (Celtic Frost cover)	Tom Gabriel Fischer	Fischer	4:55

Re-release bonus track
No.	Title	Lyrics	Length
19.	"Kingdom" (music video)	Tomasz Krajewski	3:02

== Personnel ==
Production and performance credits are adapted from the album liner notes.

Vader

- Piotr "Peter" Wiwczarek – lead vocals, rhythm guitar, lead guitar, production, mixing
- Maurycy "Mauser" Stefanowicz – rhythm guitar, lead guitar
- Leszek "Shambo" Rakowski – bass guitar
- Krzysztof "Docent" Raczkowski – drums, mixing

Note

- Recorded at Club Quattro, Tokyo, 31 August 1998.
- Mixed at Red Studio, Gdynia, 22.09-30.09.1998.
- Digital edited at Red Studio, Gdynia, 1 October 1998.

Production

- Jacek Wiśniewski – cover art and design
- Tomasz "Tom" Bonarowski – digital editing, mixing
- Andrzej "Andy" Bomba – mastering
- Mariusz Kmiolek – mastering
- Osamu "Tio" Suzuki – live photos
- Takahisa Okuno – Japanese liner notes
- Krzysztof Mierzwiński – engineering
- Shinya Tanaka – mobile recording engineer
- Mika Furukawa – lighting staff
- Osamu "Tio" Suzuki – photography
- Atsuhiro Morishige – mobile recording assistant
- Naoto Hoshino – mobile recording assistant
- Tomomi Shimura – mobile recording assistant
- Yutaka Makido – mobile recording assistant
- Keisuke Hatsushika – technician
- Misae Shiroyama – technician

== Release history ==
Region	Date	Label
Poland	30 December 1998	Metal Mind Productions
USA	23 February 1999	Pavement Music
Japan	23 March 2000	Avalon Marquee
Poland	30 March 2006	Metal Mind Productions
