= Reign Forever World =

- Cover art by Jacek Wiśniewski

EP by Vader
- Released: 16 December 2000
- Recorded: Red Studio, Gdynia, August 2000; Thrash'em All Festival, Olsztyn, August 2000
- Genre: Death metal
- Length: 32:20
- Label: Metal Blade, Metal Mind, Avalon Marquee
- Producer: Piotr Wiwczarek

Vader chronology
Litany (2000)	Reign Forever World (2000)	Revelations (2002)

Professional ratings
Review scores
Source	Rating
AllMusic	3.5/5 stars
Chronicles of Chaos	6/10 stars
Metal Hammer (PL)	favorable
Teraz Rock	3.5/5 stars

Reign Forever World is an EP by the Polish death metal band Vader. It was released on 16 December 2000 in Japan by Avalon Marquee, in Europe and Poland the EP was released via Metal Mind and Metal Blade on 22 January 2001.

Reign Forever World was recorded, and mixed in August 2000 at Red Studio in Gdynia with Piotr Łukaszewski as audio engineer. The album was mastered in September 2000 by Bartłomiej Kuźniak at Studio 333 in Częstochowa. Live tracks were recorded in August 2000 at Thrash'em All Festival in Olsztyn.

== Track listing ==
No.	Title	Lyrics	Music	Length
1.	"Reign Forever World"	Lukasz Szurmiński	Piotr Wiwczarek	4:01
2.	"Frozen Paths"	Lukasz Szurmiński	Piotr Wiwczarek	2:13
3.	"Privilege of the Gods"	Lukasz Szurmiński	Piotr Wiwczarek	4:54
4.	"Total Desaster" (Destruction cover)	Marcel Schirmer, Mike Sifringer, Thomas Sandmann	Marcel Schirmer, Mike Sifringer, Thomas Sandmann	3:10
5.	"Rapid Fire" (Judas Priest cover)	Glenn Tipton, Rob Halford, K.K. Downing	Glenn Tipton, Rob Halford, K.K. Downing	3:20
6.	"Freezing Moon" (Mayhem cover)	Per Yngve Ohlin	Øystein Aarseth	5:42
7.	"Creatures of Light and Darkness" (live)	Paweł Frelik	Piotr Wiwczarek	3:10
8.	"Carnal" (live)	Paweł Frelik	Piotr Wiwczarek	2:33
9.	"Red Dunes" (instrumental)		Piotr Wiwczarek	1:12
10.	"Lord Of Desert"	Paweł Frelik	Piotr Wiwczarek	2:00
Total length:				32:20

Japanese edition
No.	Title	Lyrics	Music	Length
1.	"Reign Forever World"	Lukasz Szurmiński	Piotr Wiwczarek	4:01
2.	"Frozen Paths"	Lukasz Szurmiński	Piotr Wiwczarek	2:13
3.	"Privilege of the Gods"	Lukasz Szurmiński	Piotr Wiwczarek	4:54
4.	"Total Desaster" (Destruction cover)	Marcel Schirmer, Mike Sifringer, Thomas Sandmann	Marcel Schirmer, Mike Sifringer, Thomas Sandmann	3:10
5.	"Rapid Fire" (Judas Priest cover)	Glenn Tipton, Rob Halford, K.K. Downing	Glenn Tipton, Rob Halford, K.K. Downing	3:20
6.	"Freezing Moon" (Mayhem cover)	Per Yngve Ohlin	Øystein Aarseth	5:42
7.	"North" (live)	Paweł Frelik	Piotr Wiwczarek	2:13
8.	"Forwards to Die!" (live)	Piotr Wiwczarek	Piotr Wiwczarek	2:11
9.	"Creatures of Light and Darkness" (live)	Paweł Frelik	Piotr Wiwczarek	3:09
10.	"Carnal" (live)	Paweł Frelik	Piotr Wiwczarek	2:33

== Personnel ==
Production and performance credits are adapted from the album liner notes.

Vader

- Piotr "Peter" Wiwczarek – lead vocals, lead guitar, bass guitar, producer
- Maurycy "Mauser" Stefanowicz – rhythm guitar
- Leszek "Shambo" Rakowski – bass guitar (live recordings only)
- Krzysztof "Doc" Raczkowski – drums

Note

- Recorded & mixed at Red Studio, Gdynia, August 2000.
- Live tracks were recorded: Thrash'em All Festival, Olsztyn, August 2000.
- Mastered at Studio 333, Częstochowa, September 2000

Production

- Jacek Wiśniewski – cover art, and design
- Piotr Łukaszewski – sound engineering
- Mariusz Kmiolek – management
- Bartek Kuźniak – mastering
- Massive Management – band photos
- Takahisa Okuno – Japanese liner notes

== Charts ==
=== Weekly ===
Chart (2001)	Peak position
Polish Albums Chart	45

=== Monthly ===
Chart (2001)	Peak position
Poland (ZPAV Top 100)	8

== Release history ==
Region	Date	Label
Japan	16 December 2000	Avalon Marquee
Europe/Poland	22 January 2001	Metal Mind Productions/Metal Blade Records
