= Night of the Apocalypse =

Video by Vader
- Released: 25 October 2004
- Recorded: Łeg Studio, Kraków, Poland, 25 March 2003; Metalmania Festival, Spodek, Katowice, Poland, 5 April 2003; Silesian Stadium, Chorzów, Poland, 31 May 2004
- Genre: Death metal
- Language: English, Polish
- Label: Metal Mind
- Producer: Tomasz Pomarańki, Tomasz Dziubiński (executive)

Vader chronology
More Vision and the Voice (2002)	Night of the Apocalypse (2004)	And Blood Was Shed in Warsaw (2007)

Professional ratings
Review scores
Source	Rating
Teraz Rock	4/5 stars
Exclaim!	favorable

Night of the Apocalypse is the second live performance recording by Polish death metal band Vader. It was released on 25 October 2004 by Metal Mind.

Night of the Apocalypse main show was recorded at Łeg Studio in Kraków on 25 March 2003. Bonus material consists fragments of Vader performance recorded at Metalmania Festival in Spodek in Katowice on 5 April 2003, and bands show as Slipknot & Metallica support recorded at Silesian Stadium in Chorzów on 31 May 2004.

The DVD also includes fully animated menu, band biography, downloadable desktop images, photo gallery, weblinks, discography, and interviews with Piotr "Peter" Wiwczarek, Krzysztof "Docent" Raczkowski, Maurycy "Mauser" Stefanowicz, and Konrad "Saimon" Karchut.

== Track listing ==
Live at Łeg Studio (Main Performance)
No.	Title	Lyrics	Music	Length
1.	"Intro 1 / Epitaph" (intro by Éric Serra)	Łukasz Szurmiński	Piotr Wiwczarek	05:47
2.	"Torch of War"	Łukasz Szurmiński	Piotr Wiwczarek	02:20
3.	"Xepher"	Paweł Frelik	Piotr Wiwczarek	04:41
4.	"Carnal"	Paweł Frelik	Piotr Wiwczarek	02:24
5.	"Reign Forever World"	Łukasz Szurmiński	Piotr Wiwczarek	03:57
6.	"Intro 2 / Breath of Centuries"	Paweł Wasilewski	Piotr Wiwczarek	05:56
7.	"Silent Empire"	Paweł Frelik	Piotr Wiwczarek	04:07
8.	"Black to the Blind"	Paweł Wasilewski	Piotr Wiwczarek	04:05
9.	"Intro 3 / Revelations of Black Moses" (intro by Jerry Goldsmith)	Paweł Frelik	Piotr Wiwczarek	08:47
10.	"North"	Paweł Frelik	Piotr Wiwczarek	02:01
11.	"Nomad"	Paweł Frelik	Piotr Wiwczarek	04:55
12.	"Sothis"	Paweł Wasilewski	Piotr Wiwczarek	04:38
13.	"Raining Blood" (Slayer cover)	Jeff Hanneman, Kerry King	Jeff Hanneman	04:44

Live at Metalmania 2003
No.	Title	Lyrics	Music	Length
1.	"Intro" (instrumental)		James Newton Howard	01:09
2.	"Xepher"	Paweł Frelik	Piotr Wiwczarek	04:12
3.	"Epitaph"	Łukasz Szurmiński	Piotr Wiwczarek	04:12
4.	"Cold Demons"	Piotr Wiwczarek	Piotr Wiwczarek	02:24
5.	"Nomad"	Paweł Frelik	Piotr Wiwczarek	04:04
6.	"Wings"	Paweł Frelik	Piotr Wiwczarek	04:40
7.	"Vicious Circle"	Paweł Wasilewski	Piotr Wiwczarek	03:24

Slipknot & Metallica Support
No.	Title	Lyrics	Music	Length
1.	"Sothis"	Paweł Wasilewski	Piotr Wiwczarek	05:31
2.	"Crucified Ones"	Piotr Wiwczarek	Piotr Wiwczarek	03:19
3.	"Epitaph"	Łukasz Szurmiński	Piotr Wiwczarek	03:49
4.	"Wings"	Paweł Frelik	Piotr Wiwczarek	03:30
5.	"Xepher"	Paweł Frelik	Piotr Wiwczarek	03:45
6.	"Carnal"	Paweł Frelik	Piotr Wiwczarek	03:38

== Personnel ==
Production and performance credits are adapted from the album liner notes.

Vader

- Piotr "Peter" Wiwczarek – guitars, lead vocals
- Maurycy "Mauser" Stefanowicz – guitars
- Marcin "Novy" Nowak – bass guitar (2004)
- Konrad "Saimon" Karchut – bass guitar
- Dariusz "Daray" Brzozowski – drums (2004)
- Krzysztof "Docent" Raczkowski – drums

Note

- Recorded & filmed at Łeg Studio, Kraków, Poland, 25 March 2003
- Recorded & filmed at Metalmania Festival, Spodek, Katowice, Poland, 5 April 2003
- Recorded & filmed at Silesian Stadium, Chorzów, Poland, 31 May 2004

Main Performance Production

- Jacek Dybowski – vision mix
- Jakub Zańczak – vision mix assistant
- Artur Wojewoda – vision editing
- Waldemar Szwajda – vision editing
- Monika Krzanowska – sound recording
- Robert Nowak – sound recording assistant
- Piotr Brzwziński – sound mix
- Jarosław Kaczyński – PA (Prosound)
- Lucjan Siwczyk – lights (Transcolor)
- Bogusław Dąbrowa-Kostka – TV lights
- Marcin Pietuch – stage design
- Telescena – stage set
- Jarosław Kaczmarek – stage manager
- Tomasz Pomarańki – TV producer
- Elżbieta Nakowska – TV producer assistant
- Tomasz Dziubiński – executive producer
