= Solitude in Madness =

- Cover art by Wes Benscoter

Studio album by Vader
- Released: 1 May 2020
- Genre: Death metal
- Length: 29:29
- Label: Nuclear Blast
- Producer: Scott Atkins

Vader chronology
Thy Messenger (2019)	Solitude in Madness (2020)

Professional ratings
Review scores
Source	Rating
Blabbermouth.net	9/10
Brave Words & Bloody Knuckles	9/10
Exclaim!	8/10
Metal Hammer	4/5 stars

Solitude in Madness is the twelfth studio album by the Polish death metal band Vader, released by Nuclear Blast on 1 May 2020. It is the band's final album featuring drummer James Stewart before his departure in February 2022.

== Release ==
In summer 2019, Vader went to Grindstone Studios in Suffolk, England. There, the band teamed up with Scott Atkins who engineered, mixed and produced the album. Solitude In Madness is the first Vader album since 1995's De Profundis to feature cover artwork by Wes Benscoter.

Vader announced album's release on 6 March 2020. The same day, the band collaborated with Hotel Radio to live-stream their upcoming performance at Underworld in London on 9 March 2020.

== Track listing ==
No.	Title	Length
1.	"Shock and Awe"	2:16
2.	"Into Oblivion"	2:24
3.	"Despair"	1:18
4.	"Incineration of the Gods"	3:32
5.	"Sanctification Denied"	3:35
6.	"And Satan Wept"	3:17
7.	"Emptiness"	2:40
8.	"Final Declaration"	2:16
9.	"Dancing in the Slaughterhouse" (Acid Drinkers cover)	2:28
10.	"Stigma of Divinity"	1:47
11.	"Bones"	3:56
Total length:		29:29

== Personnel ==
Vader

- Peter – lead guitar, vocals
- Spider – rhythm guitar
- Hal – bass
- James Stewart – drums

Production

- Scott Atkins – producing, mixing
- Wes Benscoter – artwork

== Charts ==
Chart performance for Solitude in Madness
Chart (2020)	Peak position
Austrian Albums (Ö3 Austria)	67
German Albums (Offizielle Top 100)	41
Japanese Albums (Oricon)	155
Polish Albums (ZPAV)	2
