= Litany (album) =

- Cover art by Jacek Wiśniewski

Studio album by Vader
- Released: 20 March 2000
- Recorded: Red Studio, Gdynia, November 1999
- Genre: Death metal
- Length: 30:48
- Labels: Metal Blade Records, Metal Mind Productions, Avalon/Marquee
- Producers: Piotr Wiwczarek, Adam Toczko

Vader chronology
Live in Japan (1998)	Litany (2000)	Reign Forever World (2000)

Singles from Litany
- 1. "Xeper / North" Released: 2000

Professional ratings
Review scores
Source	Rating
Chronicles of Chaos	9.5/10 stars
Exclaim!	favorable

Litany is the fourth album by the Polish death metal band Vader. It was released in 2000 by Metal Blade Records. The album charted at number 1 on Gazeta Wyborcza bestsellers list in Poland.

Litany was recorded in 1999 at Red Studio in Gdańsk, Poland, and was produced by Piotr Wiwczarek and Adam Toczko. The album was mastered by Bartłomiej Kuźniak at Studio 333 in Częstochowa, Poland.

A music video was shot for the song "Cold Demons", which was directed by Adam Kuc. The album was nominated for a Fryderyk Award in the category 'Hard & Heavy Album of the Year (Album roku - hard & heavy)'.

== Track listing ==
No.	Title	Lyrics	Music	Length
1.	"Wings"	Paweł Frelik	Piotr Wiwczarek	3:10
2.	"The One Made of Dreams"	Paweł Frelik	Piotr Wiwczarek	1:49
3.	"Xeper"	Paweł Frelik	Piotr Wiwczarek	4:00
4.	"Litany"	Paweł Frelik	Piotr Wiwczarek	3:01
5.	"Cold Demons"	Piotr Wiwczarek	Piotr Wiwczarek	3:12
6.	"The Calling"	Paweł Frelik	Piotr Wiwczarek	3:10
7.	"North"	Paweł Frelik	Piotr Wiwczarek	1:36
8.	"Forwards to Die!!!"	Piotr Wiwczarek	Piotr Wiwczarek	1:38
9.	"A World of Hurt"	Paweł Frelik	Piotr Wiwczarek	1:51
10.	"The World Made Flesh"	Paweł Frelik	Piotr Wiwczarek	2:48
11.	"The Final Massacre" (Re-recorded from The Ultimate Incantation)	Paweł Wasilewski	Piotr Wiwczarek	4:31
Total length:				30:48

Japanese Bonus Tracks
No.	Title	Lyrics	Music	Length
10.	"Red Dunes" (Instrumental)		Piotr Wiwczarek	1:12
11.	"Lord of Desert"	Paweł Frelik	Piotr Wiwczarek	2:00

Special Edition Bonus Track
No.	Title	Lyrics	Music	Length
12.	"Cold Demons" (music video)	Piotr Wiwczarek	Piotr Wiwczarek	3:12

== Personnel ==
Production and performance credits are adapted from the album liner notes.

Vader

- Peter – lead guitar, vocals, bass
- Mauser – rhythm guitar
- Doc – drums
- Shambo – bass (credited, did not perform)

Production

- Peter – lyrics
- Paweł Wasilewski – lyrics
- Paweł Frelik – lyrics
- Adam Toczko – production, sound engineering
- Tomasz Bonarowski – premastering
- Bartłomiej Kuźniak – mastering
- Jacek Wiśniewski – cover art, layout
- Katsumasa Yamaguchi – Japanese liner notes

Note

- Recorded & mixed at Red Studio, Gdynia, November 1999.
- Pre-mastered at Red Studio, Gdynia, November 1999.
- Mastered at Studio 333, Częstochowa, December 1999.

== Charts ==
Chart performance for Litany
Chart (2025)	Peak position
Polish Albums (ZPAV)	6

== Xeper / North ==
Xeper / North is the third single by the Polish death metal band Vader. It was released only in Poland in 2000 with special edition of Thrash'em All magazine entitled Super Poster" #2. The promo single insert includes interview with band members, and additional information about the band.

=== Track listing ===
No.	Title	Lyrics	Music	Length
1.	"Xeper"	Paweł Frelik	Piotr Wiwczarek	4:00
2.	"North"	Paweł Frelik	Piotr Wiwczarek	1:36

== Release history ==
Region	Date	Label
Poland	22 March 2000	Metal Mind Productions
Japan	23 March 2000	Avalon Marquee
USA/Europe	9 May 2000	Metal Blade Records
