= Necrolust =

- Cover art by Piotr Wiwczarek

Demo album by Vader
- Released: 1989
- Genre: Death metal
- Length: 17:39
- Producer: Vader

Vader chronology
Live in Decay (1986)	Necrolust (1989)	Morbid Reich (1990)

Necrolust is a demo album by the Polish death metal band Vader, released in 1989. The cover of the album was designed by Piotr Wiwczarek. Fenriz of Darkthrone cites this demo along with Celtic Frost's Morbid Tales and Bathory's Under the Sign of the Black Mark as key riff inspirations for Panzerfaust.

== Track listing ==
No.	Title	Lyrics	Music	Length
1.	"Decapitated Saints"	Piotr Wiwczarek	Piotr Wiwczarek	3:34
2.	"Reborn in Flames"	Piotr Wiwczarek	Piotr Wiwczarek	5:39
3.	"The Final Massacre"	Paweł Wasilewski	Piotr Wiwczarek	4:29
4.	"The Wrath"	Piotr Wiwczarek	Piotr Wiwczarek	3:57
Total length:				17:39

== Personnel ==
Production and performance credits are adapted from the album liner notes.

Vader

- Piotr "Peter" Wiwczarek – rhythm guitar, lead guitar, lead vocals, bass guitar, cover art, lyrics
- Krzysztof "Docent" Raczkowski – drums
- Jacek "Jackie" Kalisz – bass (credited but did not perform)

Production

- Władysław Iljaszewicz – sound engineering
- Paweł Wasilewski – lyrics

Note

- Pro Studio, Olsztyn, Poland, February–March 1989
