= Future of the Past (Vader album) =

- Cover art by Krzysztof Iwin

Compilation album by Vader
- Released: December 3, 1996
- Recorded: Mar 1994–Sep 1996
- Studio: Selani Studio, Olsztyn, Poland, Modern Sound Studio, Gdynia, Poland
- Genre: Death metal
- Length: 36:15
- Label: Koch, System Shock/SPV

Vader chronology
De Profundis (1995)	Future of the Past (1996)	Black to the Blind (1997)

Professional ratings
Review scores
Source	Rating
Collector's Guide to Heavy Metal	7/10
Rock Hard	8.0/10

Future of the Past is a compilation album by the Polish death metal band Vader. It was released in 1996 by System Shock/SPV in Europe, and in Poland by Koch International. The CD consists entirely of covers of various bands.

Future of the Past was recorded between March and September 1996 at Selani Studio in Olsztyn in Poland produced by Vader. The album was mastered by Grzegorz Piwkowski at Modern Sound Studio in Gdynia in Poland. Piotr "Peter" Wiwczarek commented on Chronicles of Chaos magazine about recording album:

"It is like a tribute album to the years and the bands who inspired us in the beginning. Apart from the Possessed, Kreator, Terrorizer, and Celtic Frost songs, we also put all the cover songs we'd done, so you can see the Sabbath and the Depeche Mode covers. [This was] because those songs only appear on promo versions, singles or whatever, and we wanted to put everything we'd made, or all the covers, onto one CD and forget about the covers for a couple of years."

== Track listing ==
No.	Title	Writer(s)	Length
1.	"Outbreak of Evil" (Sodom cover)	Chris Witchhunter, Frank Blackfire, Tom Angelripper	2:05
2.	"Flag of Hate" (Kreator cover; featuring Cezary "Cezar" Augustynowicz)	Mille Petrozza, Rob Fioretti, Jürgen Reil	3:11
3.	"Storm of Stress" (Terrorizer cover)	Oscar Garcia, Jesse Pintado, David Vincent, Pete Sandoval	1:15
4.	"Death Metal" (Possessed cover)	Jeff Becerra, Mike Torrao	2:38
5.	"Fear of Napalm" (Terrorizer cover)	Garcia, Pintado, Vincent, Sandoval	2:45
6.	"Merciless Death" (Dark Angel cover)	Don Doty, Eric Meyer, Jim Durkin, Rob Yahn, Jack Schwartz	4:05
7.	"Dethroned Emperor" (Celtic Frost cover)	Tom Gabriel Fischer	4:06
8.	"Silent Scream" (Slayer cover)	Tom Araya, Jeff Hanneman, Kerry King	2:56
9.	"We Are the League" (Anti-Nowhere League cover)	Nick Culmer, Chris Exall	2:35
10.	"I.F.Y." (Depeche Mode cover)	Martin Gore	4:20
11.	"Black Sabbath" (Black Sabbath cover; featuring Grzegorz Skawiński)	Ozzy Osbourne, Tony Iommi, Geezer Butler, Bill Ward	6:19
Total length:			36:15

Japanese edition bonus track
No.	Title	Writer(s)	Length
12.	"Oracle" (KAT cover)	Tomasz Jaguś, Piotr Luczyk, Wojciech Mrowiec, Roman Kostrzewski, Ireneusz Loth	3:25

== Personnel ==
Production and performance credits are adapted from the album liner notes.

Vader

- Piotr "Peter" Wiwczarek − rhythm guitar, lead guitar, bass guitar, lead vocals
- Leszek "Shambo" Rakowski − bass (credited, did not perform)
- Jaroslaw "China" Labieniec − rhythm guitar, lead guitar
- Krzysztof "Doc" Raczkowski − drums

Additional musicians

- Cezary "Cezar" Augustynowicz (Christ Agony) − vocals
- Grzegorz Skawiński (O.N.A.) − lead guitar

Production

- Adam Toczko − sound engineering
- Andrzej "Andy" Bomba − sound engineering
- Tomasz "Tom" Bonarowski − sound engineering
- Grzegorz Piwkowski − mastering
- Krzysztof Iwin − cover artwork
- Tomasz "Graal" Daniłowicz − layout
- Takahisa Okuno – Japanese liner notes

Note

- Tracks 1 to 7 recorded at Selani Studio, September 1996.
- Tracks 8 & 9 recorded at Selani Studio, May 1996.
- Track 10 recorded at Modern Sound, May 1995.
- Track 11 recorded at Modern Sound, March 1994.

== Release history ==
Region	Date	Label
Europe/Poland	December 3, 1996	System Shock/Impact Records, Koch International Poland
USA	June 30, 1998<	Pavement Music
Japan	March 23, 2000	Avalon Marquee
