= Black to the Blind =

- Cover art by Jacek Wiśniewski

Studio album by Vader
- Released: 13 October 1997
- Recorded: July – August 1997
- Studios: Selani Studio, Olsztyn, Poland
- Genre: Death metal
- Length: 28:47
- Labels: Koch, System Shock/SPV
- Producers: Piotr "Peter" Wiwczarek, Andrzej Bomba

Vader chronology
| Future of the Past (1996) | Black to the Blind (1997) | Live in Japan (1998) |

Alternative cover
- studio cover of 2012 re-release

Singles from Black to the Blind
- 1. "Carnal / Black to the Blind" Released: 1997

Professional ratings
Review scores
| Source | Rating |
|---|---|
| AllMusic | 2.5/5 stars |
| Chronicles of Chaos | 9/10 |
| Collector's Guide to Heavy Metal | 7/10 |
| Rock Hard | 8.0/10 |
| Teraz Rock | favorable |

Black to the Blind is the third studio album by the Polish death metal band Vader. It was released on 13 October 1997 in Europe and Poland by System Shock/SPV and Koch International Poland, respectively. Japanese edition with one bonus track was released by Avalon/Marquee. In 2025, Joe DiVita of Loudwire named the album as the best death metal album of 1997.

The album was nominated for a Fryderyk Award in the category 'Hard & Heavy Album of the Year (Album roku - hard & heavy)'.

== Background and release history ==
Black to the Blind was recorded between July and August 1997 at Selani Studio in Olsztyn, Poland, and was produced by Piotr "Peter" Wiwczarek and Andrzej Bomba. The album was mastered by Julita Emanuiłow. The album features cover art by Jacek Wiśniewski. The song "Carnal" taken from this album was used in the Polish action movie Gniew (Anger) from 1998, directed by Marcin Ziębiński. It was also released by Koch International as part of the movie soundtrack.

In 2012, Witching Hour Productions released a remastered edition of Black to the Blind with new cover art, and layout by Zbigniew Bielak. Remastering was made by Wiesławscy Brothers, and it took place at Hertz Studio, Białystok in Poland.

== Music ==
Joe DiVita of Loudwire described the album's music, saying: "With just one song cracking four minutes, Vader’s mechanized riffs were a devastating blur and a resounding statement that competition was still fierce regarding pure speed."

== Track listing ==
All music is composed by Piotr Wiwczarek.

| No. | Title | Lyrics | Length |
|---|---|---|---|
| 1. | "Heading for Internal Darkness" | Paweł Frelik | 3:46 |
| 2. | "The Innermost Ambience" | Paweł Wasilewski | 1:32 |
| 3. | "Carnal" | Frelik | 2:09 |
| 4. | "Fractal Light" | Frelik | 2:42 |
| 5. | "True Names" | Frelik | 3:36 |
| 6. | "Beast Raping" | Wasilewski | 2:42 |
| 7. | "Foetus God" | Wasilewski | 2:43 |
| 8. | "The Red Passage" | Wasilewski | 3:01 |
| 9. | "Distant Dream" | Tomasz Krajewski | 2:25 |
| 10. | "Black to the Blind" | Wasilewski | 4:08 |
| Total length: | | | 28:47 |

Japanese edition bonus track
| No. | Title | Lyrics | Length |
|---|---|---|---|
| 11. | "Anamnesis" | Wasilewski | 3:08 |
| Total length: | | | 31:55 |

== Personnel ==
Production and performance credits are adapted from the album liner notes.

Vader

- Peter – guitars, vocals, bass,
- Doc – drums
- Mauser – rhythm guitar (credited, did not perform)
- Shambo – bass (credited, did not perform)

Production

- Peter – production
- Paweł Frelik – lyrics
- Tomasz Krajewski – lyrics
- Paweł Wasilewski – lyrics
- Andrzej Bomba – sound engineering, production
- Julita Emanuiłow – mastering
- Jacek Wiśniewski – cover art
- Michał Pasich – photos
- Takahisa Okuno – Japanese liner notes
- Wojtek & Sławek Wiesławscy – remastering
- Zbigniew Bielak – cover art, layout (re-release)

== Charts ==
Chart performance for Black to the Blind
| Chart (2025) | Peak position |
|---|---|
| Polish Albums (ZPAV) | 86 |

== Carnal / Black to the Blind ==
Carnal / Black to the Blind is the second single by the Polish death metal band Vader. It was released only in Poland in 1997 with special edition of Thrash'em All magazine entitled Super Poster" #1. Apart from promo single insert includes interview with Piotr "Peter" Wiwczarek, Polish translation of lyrics from Black to the Blind, and additional information about the band.

=== Track listing ===
| No. | Title | Length |
|---|---|---|
| 1. | "Carnal" | 2:09 |
| 2. | "Black to the Blind" | 4:08 |

== Release history ==
| Region | Date | Label |
|---|---|---|
| Europe, Poland | 13 October 1997 | System Shock/Impact Records, Koch International Poland |
| USA | 21 April 1998 | Pavement Music |
| Japan | 23 March 2000 | Avalon Marquee |
| Poland | 27 November 2012 | Witching Hour Productions |
