= Revelations (Vader album) =

- Cover art by Jacek Wiśniewski

Studio album by Vader
- Released: 22 May 2002
- Recorded: Red Studio, Gdynia, February–March 2002
- Genre: Death metal
- Length: 33:28
- Label: Metal Blade Records, Metal Mind Productions, Avalon/Marquee
- Producer: Piotr "Peter" Wiwczarek

Vader chronology
| Reign Forever World (2000) | Revelations (2002) | Blood (2003) |

Singles from Revelations
- 1. "Angel of Death" Released: 10 April 2002

Professional ratings
Review scores
| Source | Rating |
|---|---|
| Chronicles of Chaos | 9/10 stars |
| Exclaim! | favorable |

Revelations is the fifth album by the Polish death metal band Vader. It was released in 2002 by Metal Blade Records. The release was preceded by the single "Angel of Death" which was released on 10 April 2002. The album was nominated for a Fryderyk Award in the category 'Heavy Metal Album of the Year (Album roku - heavy metal)'. The working title of the album was Epitaph.

Revelations was recorded between February and March 2002 at Red Studio in Gdańsk, Poland, and was produced by Piotr Wiwczarek. The album was mastered by Bartłomiej Kuźniak at Studio 333 in Częstochowa, Poland. It features guest appearances from Polish metal musicians Nergal of Behemoth who provides vocals on the track "Whisper", and Ureck of Lux Occulta who plays keyboards on the tracks: "Torch of War" and "Revelation of Black Moses."

A music video was shot for the song "Epitaph".

== Track listing ==
| No. | Title | Lyrics | Music | Length |
|---|---|---|---|---|
| 1. | "Epitaph" | Łukasz Szurmiński | Piotr Wiwczarek | 3:44 |
| 2. | "The Nomad" | Paweł Frelik | Piotr Wiwczarek | 3:50 |
| 3. | "Wolftribe" | Łukasz Szurmiński | Piotr Wiwczarek | 2:25 |
| 4. | "Whisper" (featuring Adam "Nergal" Darski) | Łukasz Szurmiński | Piotr Wiwczarek | 3:26 |
| 5. | "When Darkness Calls" | Łukasz Szurmiński | Piotr Wiwczarek | 5:16 |
| 6. | "Torch of War" | Łukasz Szurmiński | Piotr Wiwczarek | 2:45 |
| 7. | "The Code" | Łukasz Szurmiński | Piotr Wiwczarek | 2:24 |
| 8. | "Lukewarm Race" | Paweł Frelik | Piotr Wiwczarek | 2:26 |
| 9. | "Revelation of Black Moses" | Paweł Frelik | Piotr Wiwczarek | 6:56 |
| Total length: | | | | 33:28 |

Polish Bonus Track
| No. | Title | Lyrics | Music | Length |
|---|---|---|---|---|
| 5. | "Traveler" | Łukasz Szurmiński | Piotr Wiwczarek | 2:06 |

European Bonus Track
| No. | Title | Lyrics | Music | Length |
|---|---|---|---|---|
| 9. | "Son of Fire" | Piotr Wiwczarek | Piotr Wiwczarek | 2:09 |

Japanese Bonus Tracks
| No. | Title | Lyrics | Music | Length |
|---|---|---|---|---|
| 10. | "As the Fallen Rise" | Piotr Wiwczarek | Piotr Wiwczarek | 2:12 |
| 11. | "Angel of Death" (Thin Lizzy cover; featuring Jacek Hiro) | Phil Lynott, Darren Wharton | Phil Lynott, Darren Wharton | 6:33 |

USA Bonus Tracks
| No. | Title | Lyrics | Music | Length |
|---|---|---|---|---|
| 10. | "Reign Forever World" | Łukasz Szurmiński | Piotr Wiwczarek | 4:01 |
| 11. | "Frozen Paths" | Łukasz Szurmiński | Piotr Wiwczarek | 2:13 |
| 12. | "Privilege of the Gods" | Łukasz Szurmiński | Piotr Wiwczarek | 4:54 |

== Personnel ==
Production and performance credits are adapted from the album liner notes.

Vader

- Piotr "Peter" Wiwczarek – lead vocals, rhythm guitar, lead guitar, bass guitar, production
- Maurycy "Mauser" Stefanowicz – lead guitar
- Konrad "Saimon" Karchut – bass guitar (credited, did not perform)
- Krzysztof "Doc" Raczkowski – drums

Additional musicians

- Adam "Nergal" Darski (Behemoth) – guest backing vocals
- Jerzy "U.reck" Głód (Lux Occulta) – guest keyboards
- Jacek Hiro (Sceptic) – guest lead guitar

Production

- Piotr Łukaszewski – sound engineering
- Bartłomiej Kuźniak – mastering
- Jacek Wiśniewski – cover art, layout
- Massive Management – photos
- Łukasz Szurmiński – lyrics
- Paweł Frelik – lyrics

Note

- Recorded and mixed at Red Studio, Gdańsk, February/March 2002.
- Premastered & mastered at Studio 333, Częstochowa

== "Angel of Death" ==
"Angel of Death" is the fourth single by the Polish death metal band Vader. It was released only in Poland on 10 April 2002 by Empire Records. The release features two songs "When Darkness Calls", Thin Lizzy cover "Angel of Death", studio report, and multimedia presentation with 44 photos.

Main part of studio report shows drums recording, and equipment setup by Krzysztof "Doc" Raczkowski. The video consists also introduction by engineer Piotr Łukaszewski, interview with Piotr "Peter" Wiwczarek, Maurycy "Mauser" Stefanowicz guitar warming up, with addition of guest appearance by keyboardist Jerzy "U.reck" Głód from Lux Occulta.

=== Track listing ===
| No. | Title | Lyrics | Music | Length |
|---|---|---|---|---|
| 1. | "When Darkness Calls" | Łukasz Szurmiński | Piotr Wiwczarek | 5:16 |
| 2. | "Angel of Death" (Thin Lizzy cover; featuring Jacek Hiro) | Phil Lynott, Darren Wharton | Phil Lynott, Darren Wharton | 6:33 |
| 3. | "Revelations Studio Report" (video) | | | 9:42 |

== Charts ==
=== Weekly ===
| Chart (2002) | Peak position |
|---|---|
| Polish Albums Chart | 22 |

=== Monthly ===
| Chart (2002) | Peak position |
|---|---|
| Poland (ZPAV Top 100) | 20 |

== Release history ==
| Region | Date | Label |
|---|---|---|
| Japan | 22 May 2002 | Avalon Marquee |
| Poland | 27 May 2002 | Metal Mind Productions |
| USA/Europe | 4 June 2002 | Metal Blade Records |
