= And Blood Was Shed in Warsaw =

- Cover art by Marcelo HVC

Video by Vader
- Released: 8 October 2007
- Recorded: Stodoła Club, Warsaw, 12 February 2007
- Genre: Death metal
- Language: English, Polish
- Label: Metal Mind
- Producer: Tomasz Dziubiński (executive)

Vader chronology
Night of the Apocalypse (2004)	And Blood Was Shed in Warsaw (2007)

Professional ratings
Review scores
Source	Rating
About.com	5/4 stars
Blabbermouth.net	8.5/10 stars
Teraz Rock	3.5/5 stars
Exclaim!	favorable

And Blood Was Shed in Warsaw is the third live performance recording by Polish death metal band Vader. It was released on 8 October 2007 by Metal Mind.

And Blood Was Shed in Warsaw features footage from the bands concert at Stodola Club in February 2007. The show was filmed with 7 cameras. The DVD also include: fully animated menu, band biography, discography, interview with Piotr "Peter" Wiwczarek, video clips "Sword of the Witcher", and "Helleluyah!!! (God Is Dead)", desktop images, photo gallery, and weblinks.

== Track listing ==
Live at Stodoła Club, 12 February 2007, Warsaw, Poland
No.	Title	Lyrics	Music	Length
1.	"Intro" (instrumental)		Krzysztof Oloś	0:41
2.	"ShadowFear"	Harry Maat	Piotr Wiwczarek	4:40
3.	"Sothis"	Paweł Wasilewski	Piotr Wiwczarek	3:58
4.	"Helleluyah!!! (God Is Dead)"	Piotr Wiwczarek	Piotr Wiwczarek	3:10
5.	"Warlords"	Harry Maat	Maurycy Stefanowicz	2:57
6.	"Silent Empire"	Paweł Frelik	Piotr Wiwczarek	3:52
7.	"Blood of Kingu"	Piotr Wiwczarek	Piotr Wiwczarek	4:18
8.	"Intro: Out" (instrumental)		Piotr Wiwczarek	0:05
9.	"Out of the Deep"	Piotr Wiwczarek	Piotr Wiwczarek	4:40
10.	"Carnal"	Paweł Frelik	Piotr Wiwczarek	2:07
11.	"Dark Age"	Piotr Wiwczarek	Piotr Wiwczarek	4:34
12.	"Black to the Blind"	Paweł Wasilewski	Piotr Wiwczarek	4:30
13.	"Intro: Para Bellum" (instrumental)		Krzysztof Oloś	1:17
14.	"This Is the War"	Piotr Wiwczarek	Piotr Wiwczarek	2:56
15.	"Lead Us"	Piotr Wiwczarek	Maurycy Stefanowicz	3:29
16.	"What Colour Is Your Blood?"	Piotr Wiwczarek	Piotr Wiwczarek	4:02
17.	"Epitaph"	Łukasz Szurmiński	Piotr Wiwczarek	3:36
18.	"Cold Demons"	Piotr Wiwczarek	Piotr Wiwczarek	2:23
19.	"Predator"	Paweł Frelik	Piotr Wiwczarek	5:27
20.	"Wings"	Paweł Frelik	Piotr Wiwczarek	3:08
21.	"Wyrocznia" (KAT cover, featuring Tomasz "Orion" Wróblewski)	Roman Kostrzewski	Tomasz Jaguś, Piotr Luczyk, Wojciech Mrowiec, Roman Kostrzewski, Ireneusz Loth	5:27

Music videos
No.	Title	Lyrics	Music	Length
1.	"Sword of the Witcher" (directed by Andrzej Wyrozębski)	Piotr Wiwczarek	Piotr Wiwczarek	3:39
2.	"Helleluyah!!! (God Is Dead)" (directed by Andrzej Wyrozębski)	Piotr Wiwczarek	Piotr Wiwczarek	3:04

Interview with Piotr Wiwczarek
No.	Title	Length
1.	"Changes"	2:43
2.	"The Beast"	2:52
3.	"Docent's Departure"	4:17
4.	"The Art of War" / "Impressions in Blood"	5:21
5.	"Impressions in Blood": Keyboards"	1:36
6.	"Impressions in Blood": Artwork"	1:16
7.	"Impressions in Blood": Fans' Reaction"	1:50
8.	"Vader and the Internet"	5:05
9.	"Conclusion"	0:45

Bonus CD
No.	Title	Lyrics	Music	Length
1.	"Intro" (instrumental)		Krzysztof Oloś	0:41
2.	"ShadowFear"	Harry Maat	Piotr Wiwczarek	4:40
3.	"Sothis"	Paweł Wasilewski	Piotr Wiwczarek	3:58
4.	"Helleluyah!!! (God Is Dead)"	Piotr Wiwczarek	Piotr Wiwczarek	3:10
5.	"Warlords"	Harry Maat	Maurycy Stefanowicz	2:57
6.	"Silent Empire"	Paweł Frelik	Piotr Wiwczarek	3:52
7.	"Blood of Kingu"	Piotr Wiwczarek	Piotr Wiwczarek	4:18
8.	"Intro: Out" (instrumental)		Piotr Wiwczarek	0:05
9.	"Out of the Deep"	Piotr Wiwczarek	Piotr Wiwczarek	4:40
10.	"Carnal"	Paweł Frelik	Piotr Wiwczarek	2:07
11.	"Dark Age"	Piotr Wiwczarek	Piotr Wiwczarek	4:34
12.	"Black to the Blind"	Paweł Wasilewski	Piotr Wiwczarek	4:30
13.	"Intro: Para Bellum" (instrumental)		Krzysztof Oloś	1:17
14.	"This Is the War"	Piotr Wiwczarek	Piotr Wiwczarek	2:56
15.	"Lead Us"	Piotr Wiwczarek	Maurycy Stefanowicz	3:29
16.	"What Colour Is Your Blood?"	Piotr Wiwczarek	Piotr Wiwczarek	4:02
17.	"Epitaph"	Łukasz Szurmiński	Piotr Wiwczarek	3:36
18.	"Cold Demons"	Piotr Wiwczarek	Piotr Wiwczarek	2:23
19.	"Predator"	Paweł Frelik	Piotr Wiwczarek	5:27
20.	"Wings"	Paweł Frelik	Piotr Wiwczarek	3:08
21.	"Wyrocznia" (KAT cover, featuring Tomasz "Orion" Wróblewski)	Roman Kostrzewski	Tomasz Jaguś, Piotr Luczyk, Wojciech Mrowiec, Roman Kostrzewski, Ireneusz Loth	5:27

== Personnel ==
Production and performance credits are adapted from the album liner notes.

Vader

- Piotr "Peter" Wiwczarek – rhythm guitar, lead guitar, lead vocals
- Maurycy "Mauser" Stefanowicz – rhythm guitar, lead guitar
- Marcin "Novy" Nowak – bass guitar
- Dariusz "Daray" Brzozowski – drums

Additional musicians

- Tomasz "Orion" Wróblewski – lead vocals

Note

- Filmed and recorded at Stodoła Club, Warsaw, 12 February 2007

Production

- Lucjan Siwczyk – lighting
- Adam Sieklicki – photos
- Marta Tłuszcz – photos
- Piotr Brzeziński – sound recording, mixing
- Jarosław Kaszyński – sound technician
- Grzegorz Kupiec – vision mix
- Marcelo HVC – art work
- Jarosław Wieczorek – translation and subtitles
- Massive Music – management
- Artur Wojewoda – vision editing
- Waldemar Szwajda – vision editing
- Tomasz Dziubiński – executive producer
- Darek Świtała – interview editing & filming
- Piotr Godzina – interview editing & filming
