= The Ultimate Incantation =

1992 debut studio album by Vader

- Cover art by Dan Seagrave

Studio album by Vader
- Released: 16 November 1992
- Recorded: 1992, Rhythm Studios, England (originally recorded at Sunlight Studios)
- Genre: Death metal
- Length: 48:25
- Labels: Earache Records, Relativity Records, Carnage Records, Toy's Factory, Metal Mind Productions
- Producer: Paul Johnson

Vader chronology
The Ultimate Incantation (1992)	De Profundis (1995)

Professional ratings
Review scores
Source	Rating
AllMusic	3/5 stars

The Ultimate Incantation is the debut studio album by Polish death metal band Vader. It was released in 1992 by Earache Records. A music video was shot for the song "Dark Age", which was directed by Kimmo Kuusniemi and Tanja Katinka.

== Background and recording ==
The cover art was drawn by Dan Seagrave. The album was originally recorded at Sunlight Studio with Thomas Skogsberg, but neither the record label or Vader was pleased with the outcome and decided to use another studio because of technical issues. The new studio that they recorded at was Rhythm Studios in England with producer Paul Johnson. Piotr "Peter" Wiwczarek commented on Decibel magazine about recording album at Sunlight Studios, saying:

[...]It was rather an opportunity to record our debut album at the famous Sunlight. We knew many fabulous LPs [had been] recorded in this studio, so the whole of Vader was more than happy. [...] There was no real acoustic drum kit in the studio. Not one of us was expecting or had worked before on such equipment. We had nothing to say, but had to keep recording on what we had available. We owned no professional equipment yet. [...] We had to use rented stuff and what was provided to play in the studio. My guitar was maybe good enough for live performances, but far from being studio-ready. Doc brought some cymbals and pedals and that was it. [...] All we had in-studio were electronic drum pads and a combo amp for guitar. Vader was all about blastbeats… and that electronic drum kit was not made for that.

== Reception and legacy ==
Steve Huey of AllMusic contended that The Ultimate Incantation cemented Vader as one of the most technically proficient bands in the death metal genre. However, he claimed that the raw production values impaired the clarity of the album's instrumentation.

== Track listing ==
All music is composed by Piotr Wiwczarek.

No.	Title	Lyrics	Length
1.	"Creation (Intro)" (instrumental)		1:29
2.	"Dark Age"	Piotr Wiwczarek	4:40
3.	"Vicious Circle"	Paweł Wasilewski	2:53
4.	"The Crucified Ones"	Piotr Wiwczarek	3:36
5.	"Final Massacre"	Paweł Wasilewski	4:55
6.	"Testimony"	Piotr Wiwczarek	4:00
7.	"Reign Carrion"	Piotr Wiwczarek	6:49
8.	"Chaos"	Paweł Wasilewski	4:27
9.	"One Step to Salvation"		3:48
10.	"Demon's Wind"		4:27
11.	"Decapitated Saints"	Piotr Wiwczarek	2:27
12.	"Breath of Centuries"	Paweł Wasilewski	4:51
Total length:			48:25

== Personnel ==
Production and performance credits are adapted from the album liner notes.

Vader

- Peter − guitars, bass, vocals
- Doc − drums
- Jackie − bass (credited, did not perform)
- China − rhythm guitar (credited, did not perform)

Production

- Peter − lyrics
- Paweł Wasilewski − lyrics
- Paul Johnson − sound engineering, production
- Dan Seagrave − cover artwork
- Francesca Hollings − photography
- Tomek Malinowski − photography

Note

- Recorded & mixed at Rhythm Studios, England, UK, 1992

== Release history ==
Region	Date	Label
Poland	1992	Carnage Records
Europe, US	16 November 1992	Earache Records, Relativity Records
Japan	1 March 1993	Toy's Factory
Poland	1994	Metal Mind Productions
