= De Profundis (Vader album) =

- Cover art by Wes Benscoter

Studio album by Vader
- Released: 5 July 1995
- Recorded: May 1995
- Studios: Modern Sound Studio, Gdynia, Poland
- Genre: Death metal
- Length: 34:01
- Labels: Croon Records (Poland); System Shock/SPV (rest of Europe)
- Producers: Adam Toczko, Vader

Vader chronology
The Darkest Age: Live '93 (1994)	De Profundis (1995)	Future of the Past (1996)

Singles from De Profundis
- 1. "An Act of Darkness / I.F.Y." Released: 1995

Professional ratings
Review scores
Source	Rating
AllMusic	2.5/5 stars
Chronicles of Chaos	10/10
Collector's Guide to Heavy Metal	6/10
Metal.de	9/10
Rock Hard	8.5/10

De Profundis is the second album by the Polish death metal band Vader. The album was originally released in Poland by Croon Records and in the US by Pavement Music, but with no lyrics and a normal inner CD layout. It was re-released with a bonus track by Metal Mind Productions in 2003 with a cover of the Depeche Mode song "I Feel You". It was also re-released for Japan in 1997 by Avalon Records/Marquee Records with two bonus tracks.

De Profundis was recorded in May 1995 at Modern Sound Studio in Gdynia, Poland, and was produced by Piotr Wiwczarek and Adam Toczko. The album was mastered by Grzegorz Piwkowski.

A live music video was shot for the song "Incarnation" during the Marlboro Sopot Rock Festival in Poland.

The album sold approximately 17,000 units in two weeks in Poland.

== Track listing ==
All music is composed by Piotr Wiwczarek, except where noted.

No.	Title	Lyrics	Length
1.	"Silent Empire"	Paweł Frelik	4:02
2.	"An Act of Darkness"	Paweł Wasilewski	1:55
3.	"Blood of Kingu"	Wiwczarek	4:38
4.	"Incarnation"	Wasilewski	3:07
5.	"Sothis"	Wasilewski	3:42
6.	"Revolt"	Wiwczarek	3:35
7.	"Of Moon, Blood, Dream, and Me"	Wasilewski	3:51
8.	"Vision and the Voice"	Wasilewski	3:28
9.	"Reborn in Flames"	Wiwczarek	5:39
Total length:			34:01

Japanese edition bonus tracks
No.	Title	Lyrics	Length
1.	"De Profundis" (instrumental)		1:36
2.	"The Wrath"	Wiwczarek	4:53

US edition bonus track
No.	Title	Lyrics	Music	Length
10.	"I Feel You" (Depeche Mode cover)	Martin Gore	Gore	4:24

== Personnel ==
Production and performance credits are adapted from the album liner notes.

Vader

- Peter − lead guitar, bass, vocals
- China − rhythm guitar
- Doc − drums
- Shambo − bass (credited, did not perform)

Production

- Peter − lyrics
- Paweł Frelik − lyrics
- Paweł Wasilewski − lyrics
- Tomasz Malinowski − photos
- Mariusz Kmiołek − management
- Tomasz "Tom" Bonarowski − sound engineering
- Adam Toczko − sound engineering, production
- Grzegorz Piwkowski − mastering
- Wes Benscoter − cover art

== An Act of Darkness / I.F.Y. ==
An Act of Darkness / I.F.Y. is the first single by the Polish death metal band Vader. It was released in 1995 by Croon Records in Poland, and System Shock/Impact Records in the rest of Europe.

=== Track listing ===
No.	Title	Lyrics	Music	Length
1.	"An Act of Darkness"	Wasilewski	Wiwczarek	1:55
2.	"I Feel You" (Depeche Mode cover)	Gore	Gore	4:24

== Charts ==
Chart performance for De Profundis
Chart (2021)	Peak position
German Albums (Offizielle Top 100)	91
Polish Albums (ZPAV)	3

== Release history ==
Formats	Region	Date	Label
CS, CD	Poland	5 September 1995	Croon Records
CD	Europe	1996	System Shock/Impact Records
CD	USA	1996	Conquest Music
CD	USA	30 June 1998	Pavement Music
CD	Japan	23 March 2000	Avalon Marquee
CD	Poland	30 March 2006	Metal Mind Productions
