= Impact Records =

American record label

- Country of origin: United States

Impact Records was an American record label founded in 1989 by Carl Sturken and Evan Rogers. It was once a subsidiary of MCA Records. Its back catalog remains part of Universal Music Group.

Acts on the label are and/or have included: Sass Jordan, The Fixx, Rythm Syndicate, Michael Learns To Rock, Joey Lawrence, and Southside Johnny and the Asbury Jukes.

== See also ==
- List of record labels
