= Maurycy Stefanowicz =

Polish guitarist (born 1976)

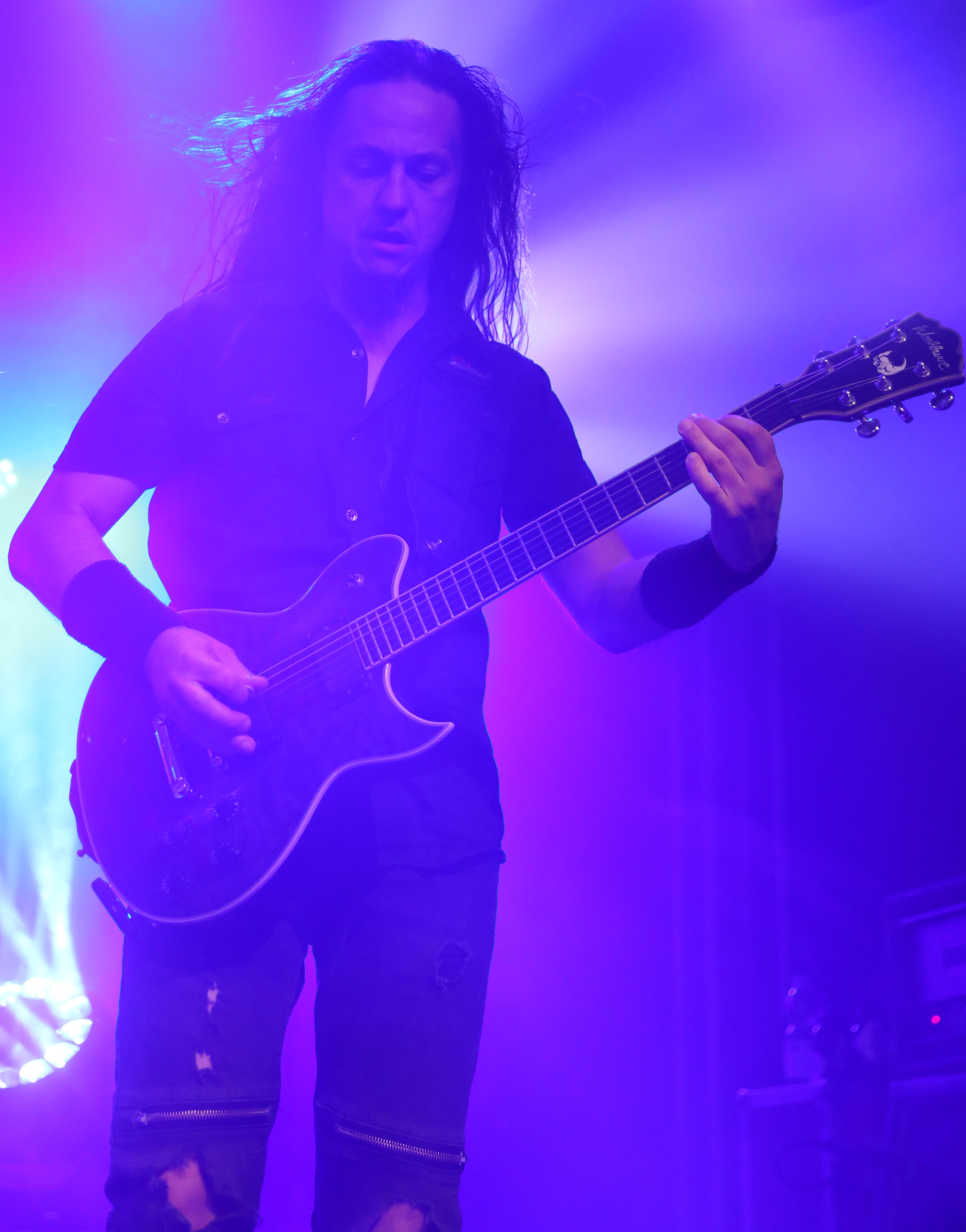
- Stefanowicz in 2023
- Born: 1976 (age 48–49); Szczytno, Poland
- Occupations: Musician, songwriter, producer
- Spouse: Anna Stefanowicz
- Children: 2
- Musical career
- Also known as: Mauser
- Genres: Death metal, black metal, Gothic metal
- Instruments: Guitar, bass, keyboard, vocals
- Years active: 1992–present
- Labels: Metal Blade, Regain Records, Mystic Production, Century Media

Maurycy "Mauser" Stefanowicz (born 1976) is a Polish guitarist. Stefanowicz has played with such bands as Vader, Dies Irae, Christ Agony, UnSun. He is sponsored by Washburn Guitars.

== Discography ==
Vader

- Black to the Blind (1997, System Shock/Impact Records)
- Litany (2000, Metal Blade Records)
- Revelations (2002, Metal Blade Records)
- The Beast (2004, Metal Blade Records)
- Impressions in Blood (2006, Regain Records)
- And Blood Was Shed in Warsaw (DVD, 2007, Metal Mind)
- XXV (2008, Regain Records)

Dies Irae

- Immolated (2000, Metal Blade Records)
- The Sin War (2002, Metal Blade Records)
- Sculpture of Stone (2004, Metal Mind Productions)

Christ Agony

- Moonlight – Act III (1996, Cacophonous Records)
- Darkside (1997, Hammerheart Records)

UnSun

- The End of Life (2008, Century Media Records)
- Clinic for Dolls (2010, Mystic Production)

Guest appearances

- Vesania – God the Lux (2005, Napalm Records)
- Chainsaw – Evilution (2009, Metal Mind Productions)
- Never – Back to the Front (2009, Metal Mind Productions)
