= Krzysztof Raczkowski =

Background information
- Also known as: Docent, Doc
- Born: 29 October 1970; Kętrzyn, Poland
- Died: 18 August 2005 (aged 34); Olsztyn, Poland
- Genres: Death metal, black metal
- Occupation(s): Musician, songwriter
- Instrument(s): Drums, percussion
- Years active: 1988–2005

Krzysztof Raczkowski (29 October 1970 – 18 August 2005), also known as Docent or Doc, was a Polish drummer, best known as a member of Polish death metal bands Vader (1988–2005) and Dies Irae. He also appeared as a guest or temporary musician in Sweet Noise, Hunter, Slashing Death, Unborn, Moon, and Overdub Trio.

== Final years ==
In the last few years of his life, Raczkowski had been suffering serious alcohol problems.

Originally, drum sessions for Vader's album, The Beast took place at Hertz Studio in Białystok in February 2004, however, Raczkowski fell down a flight of stairs, causing arm and leg injuries. Because of the accident, the studio sessions was postponed. Ultimately, the band decided to hire Vesania drummer Dariusz "Daray" Brzozowski as a session musician. Piotr "Peter" Wiwczarek talked about the accident while working on the album, saying:

[...]factor that was pretty important was The Beast was the first album without Doc drumming on it. Believe me, if Doc had been on the record (and he was supposed to be, as we had started recording it when he fell and broke his hand, basically because he was drunk, which was one of the reasons we decided he had to quit the band), it wouldn't have been such a big drama around it. First, I tried to make The Beast more melodic compared to the previous one, Revelations. And then we had a new guy (Daray) replacing one [of] the most important persons in the band (Doc), who created Vader and its songs since the beginning.

In March 2005, Krzysztof Raczkowski officially left Vader. Piotr Wiwczarek, the band's lead singer, said in an official statement on their website:

Doc pretty hard tried to 'fight' against his weaknesses, which were troubles for all of us. Finally he had not prevailed over that battle... All in all, he attempted... Vader today is not just a friendship anymore — it's our life with armies of man involved in music, releases and, first of all, fans waiting for shows or new albums... This is a high responsibility, not too many know about. If a person, even the most talented one, cannot stand it — [he] has to leave... That was Doc's decision as well.

Maurycy Stefanowicz, the guitarist of the band, mentioned Krzysztof's problem with alcohol in an interview in April 2005.

Doc's alcohol problems eventually caused him to die unexpectedly from heart failure in August 2005. He was 34 years old. His grave is located in Korsze, Poland.

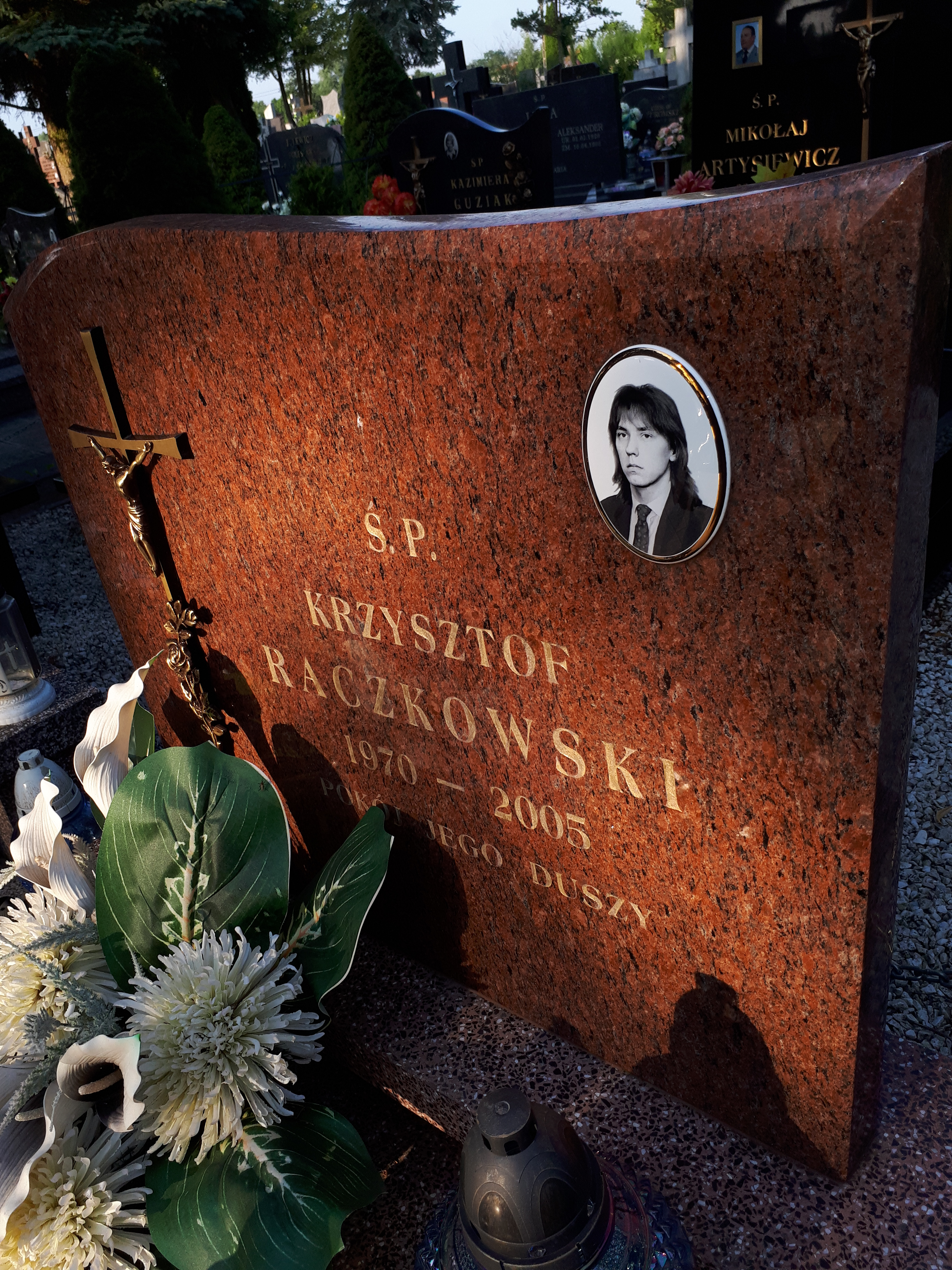
Doc's gravestone, July 2019

== Drums setup ==
Alchemy Professional cymbals
- AHR14 Rock Hi-hat 14"
- ASWC17 Sweet Crash 17"
- ACM18 Medium Crash 18"
- ARWR22 Raw Ride 22"
- ACH22 China 22"
- ARWCH16 Raw China 16"
- ASPR12 Rock Splash 12"
- ABL8 Bell 8"
- ARWB6 Raw Bell 6"

Pedals

- Tama Iron Cobra
Yamaha Drums
- Bass Drum 22" Stage Custom
- Bass Drum 22" Stage Custom
- Tom Tom: 12" Maple Custom
- Tom Tom: 13" Maple Custom
- Tom Tom: 14" Maple Custom
- Floor Tom: 16" Maple Custom
- Snare Yamaha Power V 6,5 x 14"

Electronics

- Alesis D4 Trigger Module
- Ddrum Trigger Clamps

== Discography ==
=== Other ===
- Slashing Death - Live at Thrash Camp (1988, demo)
- Slashing Death - Irrevocably & With No Hope (1989, demo)
- Slashing Death - Kill Me 'Coz I Can't Stop (1990, demo)
- Sweet Noise - Getto (1996, as guest)
- Moon - Daemon's Heart (1997)
- Black Altar - Na uroczysku (1998, drums programming)
- Christ Agony - Elysium (1999)
- Tower - Mercury (1999, as producer)
- Dies Irae - Immolated (2000)
- Dies Irae - The Sin War (2002)
- Sweet Noise - Revolta (2003, guest)
- Dies Irae - Sculpture of Stone (2004)
- Sweet Noise - The Triptic (2007, as member)
- Atrocious Filth - Atrocious Filth (2008)

== Videography ==
- Vader - Vision and Voice (1998, VHS)
- Vader - More Vision and the Voice (2002, DVD)
- Vader - Night of the Apocalypse (2005, DVD)
- Dies Irae - The Art of an Endless Creation (2009, DVD)
