= Piotr Wiwczarek =

Polish musician (born 1965)

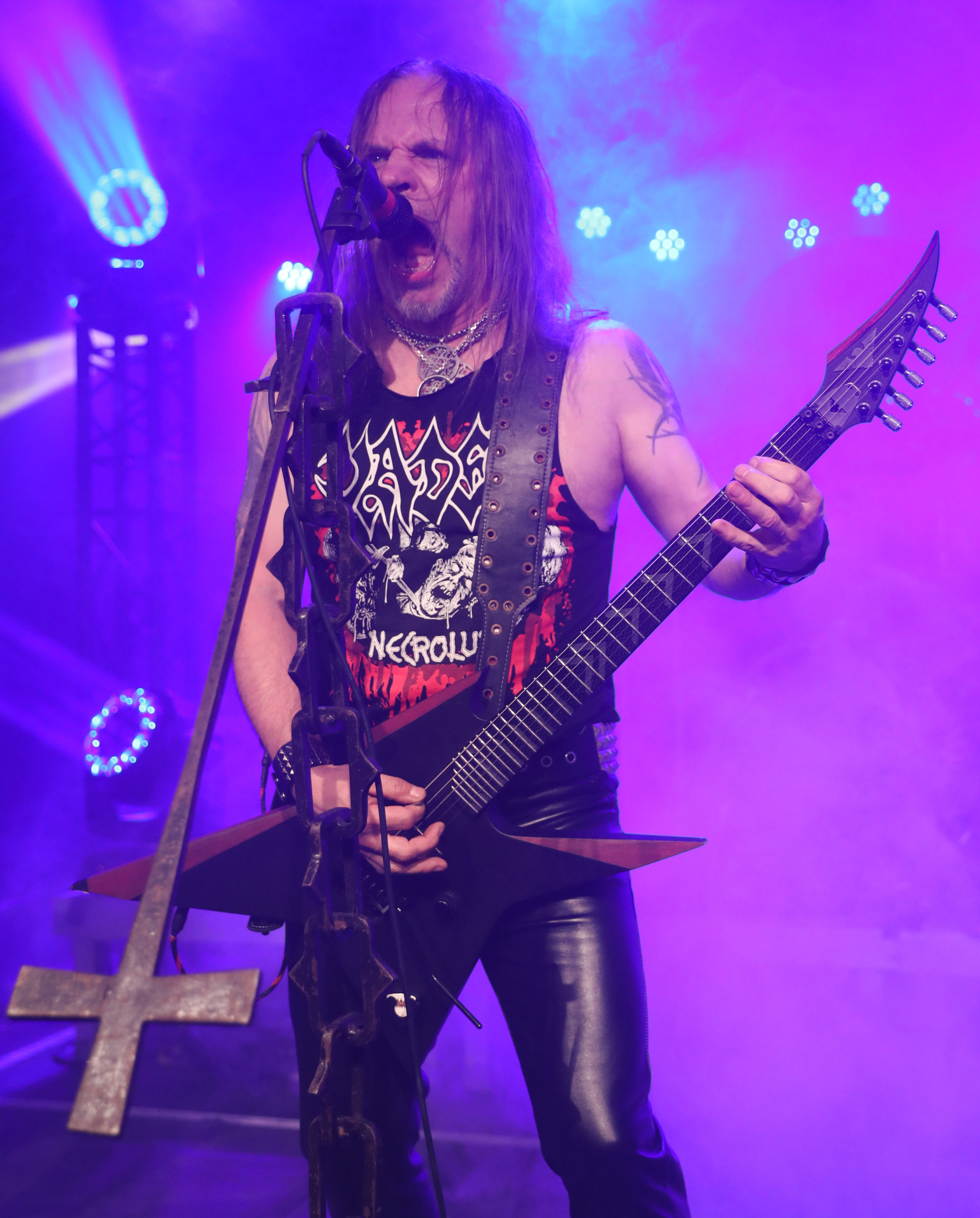
- Piotr Wiwczarek in 2023
- Born: 22 October 1965 (age 60); Olsztyn, Poland
- Occupations: singer, songwriter, producer
- Spouse: Marta Wiwczarek
- Children: 2
- Parent(s): Zbigniew Wiwczarek; Maria Wiwczarek
- Relatives: Paweł Wiwczarek (brother)
- Musical career
- Also known as: Peter, Behemoth
- Genres: Death metal, thrash metal, heavy metal
- Instruments: Guitar, vocals, bass
- Years active: 1983–present
- Label: Nuclear Blast
- Member of: Vader
- Formerly of: Panzer X

Piotr Paweł Wiwczarek (born 22 October 1965 in Olsztyn, Poland), also known as Peter, (ex nickname Behemoth) is a Polish musician who is the vocalist and lead guitarist for the death metal band Vader, as the only constant member of the band since its inception. He has also collaborated with Kazimierz "Para" Paraszczuk on his tribute album, Bandid Rockin', and is the producer of several of Vader's releases. He was also the founder and guitarist of a side-project, named Panzer X. Panzer X was active between 2004 and 2007. After giving a single concert in 2012, they disbanded again that same year.

Wiwczarek also became a producer for the first time in 1999, when producing the Polish death metal band Decapitated's first release, Winds of Creation.

== Gear ==
- 4x Ran Invader, 6 string (EMG 81 Pickup)
- Ran Invader, 6 string (EMG X Pickup)
- P. Kamecki customs cold demon
- Laboga Mr. Hector Amplifier
- Laboga 412 V30 Cabinets
- Mesa Boogie Dual Rectifier Solo Head
- Morley Bad Horsie II
- Boss NS-1
- POD XT Live
- Mipro ACT 707s
- Ernie Ball Strings (.010"-.052")

== Discography ==
- Slashing Death – Live at Thrash Camp (1988, guest vocals)
- Impurity – In Pain We Trust (1990, guest bass guitar)
- Para Wino Band – Bandid Rockin (1993, guest vocals)
- Kingdom of the Lie – About the Rising Star (1993, guest guitar)
- Proletaryat – Live 93 (1994, guest guitar)
- Misya – Misya (1994, guest vocals)
- Sweet Noise – Getto (1996, guest vocals)
- Decapitated – Winds of Creation (2000, producer)
- Ceti – Shadow of the Angel (2003, guest vocals)
- Panzer X – Steel Fist (2004, guitar, vocals)
- Crionics – N.O.I.R. (2010, guest vocals)
- VA - Mazurski cud (2011, single)
- Crystal Viper – Crimen Excepta (2012, guest vocals)
- Sabaton – 40:1 (2013, single, guest vocals)
- Insidius - Vulgus Illustrata (2025, guest vocals)

== Filmography ==
- Historia polskiego rocka (2008, documentary, directed: Leszek Gnoiński, Wojciech Słota)
