= Taniec z gwiazdami season 24 =

Polish TV show

Taniec z gwiazdami
- Season 24
- Hosted by: Krzysztof Ibisz; Paulina Sykut-Jeżyna
- Judges: Andrzej Grabowski; Iwona Pavlović; Michał Malitowski
- Celebrity winner: Edyta Zając
- Professional winner: Michał Bartkiewicz
- No. of episodes: 10

Release
- Original network: Polsat
- Original release: 6 March – 23 October 2020

Season chronology
- ← Previous; Season 23 Next → Season 25

The 24th season of Taniec z gwiazdami, the Polish edition of Dancing with the Stars, started on 6 March 2020 and stopped on 13 March 2020 to 4 September of that year due COVID-19 pandemic. This is the eleventh season aired on Polsat.

On 23 October, Edyta Zając and her partner Michał Bartkiewicz were crowned the champions.

== Couples ==
Celebrity	Notability	Professional partner	Status
Marcin Bosak	Film and television actor	Wiktoria Omyła	Withdrew
Tomasz Oświeciński	Actor and MMA fighter	Janja Lesar (Weeks 1–2); Wiktoria Omyła (Week 3)	Eliminated 1st on 4 September 2020
Nicole Bogdanowicz	Przyjaciółki actress	Kamil Kuroczko	Eliminated 2nd on 18 September 2020
Milena Rostkowska-Galant	Polsat weather presenter	Jacek Jeschke	Eliminated 3rd on 25 September 2020
Mikołaj Jędruszczak	Tennis player and Love Island. Wyspa Miłości winner	Sylwia Madeńska	Eliminated 4th on 2 October 2020
Bogdan Kalus	Ranczo actor and comedian	Lenka Klimentova	Withdrew on 9 October 2020
Anna Karwan	Singer, actress and The Voice of Poland finalist	Jan Kliment; Kamil Kuroczko (Week 8)	Eliminated 5th on 9 October 2020
Sylwia Lipka	Singer and influencer	Rafał Maserak	Withdrew on 16 October 2020
Sylwester Wilk	Disabled personal trainer and Ninja Warrior Polska semifinalist	Hanna Żudziewicz	Third Place on 16 October 2020; Withdrew on 11 September 2020
Julia Wieniawa	Actress and singer	Stefano Terrazzino	Runners-up on 23 October 2020
Edyta Zając	Model	Michał Bartkiewicz	Winners on 23 October 2020

== Scores ==
Couple	Place	1	2	3	1+2+3	4	5	4+5	6	7	8	9	10
Edyta & Michał	1	18	22	25	65	25	27	52	26	26	30+28=58†	25+30=55	30+29+30=89
Julia & Stefano	2	26†	30†	25	81†	25	28	53	30†	1+29=30†	27+30=57	30+29=59†	29+30+30=89
Sylwester & Hanna	3	23	24	24	71	30†						25+25=50‡	
Sylwia & Rafał	4	20	20	20	60	20	22	42	24+2=26	26	26+26=52	—	
Anna & Jan	5	23	27	27†	77	27	30†	57†	28	1+28=29	26+25=51‡		
Bogdan & Lenka	6	18	18	13‡	49	17‡	17	34‡	20+1=21	1+20=21‡	—		
Mikołaj & Sylwia	7	17	16	16	49	22	12‡	34‡	19‡	22			
Milena & Jacek	8	16	18	23	57	19	21	40	22				
Nicole & Kamil	9	18	15	18	51	20	20	40					
Tomasz & Janja / Wiktoria	10	13‡	17	13‡	43‡								
Marcin & Wiktoria	11	16	14‡	—									

Red numbers indicate the lowest score for each week.
Green numbers indicate the highest score for each week.
indicates the couple eliminated that week.
indicates the returning couple that finished in the bottom two or three.
indicates the couple saved from elimination by immunity.
indicates the winning couple.
indicates the runner-up.
indicates the couple in third place.
indicates the couple withdrew from the competition.

== Average score chart ==
This table only counts for dances scored on a 30-points scale.

Rank by average	Place	Couple	Total points	Number of dances	Average
1	2	Julia & Stefano	398	14	28.4
2	5	Anna & Jan	241	9	26.8
3	1	Edyta & Michał	371	14	26.5
4	3	Sylwester & Hanna	151	6	25.2
5	4	Sylwia & Rafał	204	9	22.7
6	8	Milena & Jacek	119	6	19.8
7	9	Nicole & Kamil	91	5	18.2
8	7	Mikołaj & Sylwia	124	7	17.7
9	6	Bogdan & Lenka	123	7	17.6
10	11	Marcin & Wiktoria	30	2	15.0
11	10	Tomasz & Janja / Wiktoria	43	3	14.3

== Highest and lowest scoring performances ==
The best and worst performances in each dance according to the judges' 30-point scale:

Dance	Best dancer(s)	Highest score	Worst dancer(s)	Lowest score
Cha-cha-cha	Julia Wieniawa	30	Bogdan Kalus	13
Tango	Julia Wieniawa; Edyta Zając	30	Tomasz Oświeciński	13
Waltz	Anna Karwan	28	Tomasz Oświeciński	13
Jive	Julia Wieniawa	29	Marcin Bosak	14
Foxtrot	Edyta Zając	26	Bogdan Kalus	17
Quickstep	Edyta Zając	25	Nicole Bogdanowicz	15
Samba	Julia Wieniawa	30	Mikołaj Jędruszczak	12
Viennese Waltz	Edyta Zając	30	Mikołaj Jędruszczak	19
Charleston	Julia Wieniawa	28	Nicole Bogdanowicz	20
Contemporary	Sylwester Wilk; Julia Wieniawa	30	Sylwia Lipka	20
Rumba	Anna Karwan; Julia Wieniawa; Edyta Zając	30	Sylwia Lipka	22
Paso Doble	Julia Wieniawa	29	Bogdan Kalus	20
Freestyle	Julia Wieniawa	30	Edyta Zając	29

== Couples' highest and lowest scoring dances ==
According to the 30-point scale:

Couples	Highest scoring dance(s)	Lowest scoring dance(s)
Edyta & Michał	Tango (twice), Rumba, Viennese Waltz (30)	Waltz (18)
Julia & Stefano	Tango, Rumba, Contemporary, Samba, Freestyle, Cha-cha-cha (30)	Jive, Viennese Waltz (25)
Sylwester & Hanna	Contemporary (30)	Waltz (23)
Sylwia & Rafał	Waltz, Samba, Tango (26)	Jive, Foxtrot, Samba, Contemporary (20)
Anna & Jan	Rumba (30)	Cha-cha-cha (23)
Bogdan & Lenka	Samba, Paso Doble (20)	Cha-cha-cha (13)
Mikołaj & Sylwia	Waltz, Foxtrot (22)	Samba (12)
Milena & Jacek	Waltz (23)	Tango (16)
Nicole & Kamil	Charleston, Waltz (20)	Quickstep (15)
Tomasz & Janja / Wiktoria	Jive (17)	Waltz, Tango (13)
Marcin & Wiktoria	Tango (16)	Jive (14)

== Weekly scores ==
Unless indicated otherwise, individual judges scores in the charts below (given in parentheses) are listed in this order from left to right: Andrzej Grabowski, Iwona Pavlović and Michał Malitowski.

=== Week 1: Season Premiere ===
Running order

Couple	Score	Dance	Music
Anna & Jan	23 (9,7,7)	Cha-cha-cha	"Testosteron"—Kayah
Mikołaj & Sylwia	17 (7,5,5)	Cha-cha-cha	"She Bangs"—Ricky Martin
Marcin & Wiktoria	16 (8,3,5)	Tango	"Whatever It Takes"—Imagine Dragons
Tomasz & Janja	13 (7,3,3)	Waltz	"Skyfall"—Adele
Bogdan & Lenka	18 (8,6,4)	Jive	"Honey, Honey"—ABBA
Milena & Jacek	16 (7,4,5)	Tango	"Objection (Tango)"—Shakira
Edyta & Michał	18 (8,6,4)	Waltz	"I Wonder Why"—Curtis Stigers
Julia & Stefano	26 (9,8,9)	Cha-cha-cha	"Z Tobą nie umiem wygrać"—Ania Dąbrowska
Nicole & Kamil	18 (7,5,6)	Jive	"Two Hearts"—Phil Collins
Sylwester & Hanna	23 (9,7,7)	Waltz	"Against All Odds (Take a Look at Me Now)"—Phil Collins
Sylwia & Rafał	20 (8,6,6)	Jive	"Lustra"—Natalia Szroeder

=== Week 2 ===
On March 11, 2020, Polsat announced that for now they will be shooting show with no studio audience to protect the health and safety of the staff and crew.

At the end of the show, the hosts announced that the season would be halted due to the coronavirus pandemic.

Running order

Couple	Score	Dance	Music
Tomasz & Janja	17 (8,5,4)	Jive	"Crazy Little Thing Called Love"—Queen
Sylwia & Rafał	20 (9,5,6)	Foxtrot	"Every Breath You Take"—The Police
Sylwester & Hanna	24 (9,8,7)	Cha-cha-cha	"If I Can't Have You"—Shawn Mendes
Nicole & Kamil	15 (7,4,4)	Quickstep	"I Don't Feel Like Dancin'"—Scissor Sisters
Mikołaj & Sylwia	16 (7,6,3)	Tango	"Paparazzi"—Lady Gaga
Edyta & Michał	22 (8,7,7)	Samba	"I Don't Care"—Ed Sheeran & Justin Bieber
Bogdan & Lenka	18 (8,6,4)	Waltz	"Orła cień"—Varius Manx
Milena & Jacek	18 (8,5,5)	Cha-cha-cha	"One Kiss"—Calvin Harris & Dua Lipa
Anna & Jan	27 (10,9,8)	Viennese Waltz	"Love on the Brain"—Rihanna
Marcin & Wiktoria	14 (7,3,4)	Jive	"Małomiasteczkowy"—Dawid Podsiadło
Julia & Stefano	30 (10,10,10)	Tango	"El Tango de Roxanne"—from Moulin Rouge!

=== Week 3 ===
At the beginning of the show hosts announced that Marcin Bosak had withdrawn from the show due to a professional reasons. Moreover, Tomasz Oświeciński's dance partner, Janja Lesar, had left the show due to private issues. She was replaced by Wiktoria Omyła.

Running order

Couple	Score	Dance	Music	Result
Sylwia & Rafał	20 (8,6,6)	Samba	"Solo"—Clean Bandit feat. Demi Lovato	Safe
Bogdan & Lenka	13 (6,4,3)	Cha-cha-cha	"Sunshine Day"—Osibisa	Safe
Anna & Jan	27 (9,10,8)	Samba	"Shape of You"—Ed Sheeran	Safe
Milena & Jacek	23 (9,7,7)	Waltz	"Always Remember Us This Way"—Lady Gaga	Bottom two
Mikołaj & Sylwia	16 (7,5,4)	Jive	"One Way or Another"—Blondie	Safe
Nicole & Kamil	18 (7,6,5)	Cha-cha-cha	"Szampan"—Sanah	Safe
Edyta & Michał	25 (10,8,7)	Tango	"Hej hej!"—Daria Zawiałow	Safe
Julia & Stefano	25 (9,9,7)	Jive	"Sweet but Psycho"—Ava Max	Safe
Sylwester & Hanna	24 (9,7,8)	Foxtrot	"Barbie Girl"—Aqua	Safe
Tomasz & Wiktoria	13 (6,3,4)	Tango	"Czułe miejsce"—Baranovski	Eliminated

=== Week 4: Personal Stories ===
As the voting results were being read out, Sylwester Wilk announced his decision to leave the competition due to health concerns.

Running order

Couple	Score	Dance	Music	Result
Nicole & Kamil	20 (8,6,6)	Charleston	"Anything Goes"—Cole Porter	Safe
Sylwester & Hanna	30 (10,10,10)	Contemporary	"Fix You"—Coldplay	Withdrew
Milena & Jacek	19 (8,5,6)	Jive	"Marry You"—Bruno Mars	Safe
Julia & Stefano	25 (9,9,7)	Viennese Waltz	"Say You Love Me"—Jessie Ware	Safe
Bogdan & Lenka	17 (7,4,6)	Foxtrot	"I've Got You Under My Skin"—Frank Sinatra	Safe
Sylwia & Rafał	20 (8,7,5)	Contemporary	"Sign of the Times"—Harry Styles	Safe
Edyta & Michał	25 (10,8,7)	Rumba	"Halo"—Beyoncé	Safe
Anna & Jan	27 (9,9,9)	Tango	"Aleja gwiazd"—Zdzisława Sośnicka	Safe
Mikołaj & Sylwia	22 (9,6,7)	Waltz	"Jej portret"—Bogusław Mec	Safe

=== Week 5: Polish Movies Week ===
Running order

Couple	Score	Dance	Music	Movie	Result
Bogdan & Lenka	17 (7,5,5)	Quickstep	"Co ty tutaj robisz"—Elektryczne Gitary	Kiler	Safe
Sylwia & Rafał	22 (9,7,6)	Rumba	"Szukaj mnie"—Edyta Geppert	Miszmasz, czyli kogel-mogel 3	Safe
Milena & Jacek	21 (8,6,7)	Foxtrot	"Śniadanie do łóżka"—Andrzej Piaseczny	Śniadanie do łóżka	Safe
Mikołaj & Sylwia	12 (6,3,3)	Samba	"Porady na zdrady (Dreszcze)"—Ania Dąbrowska	Porady na zdrady	Safe
Edyta & Michał	27 (10,9,8)	Viennese Waltz	"Feel It"—Michele Morrone	365 Dni	Safe
Julia & Stefano	28 (10,9,9)	Charleston	"Vabank"—Henryk Kuźniak	Vabank	Safe
Nicole & Kamil	20 (8,6,6)	Waltz	"Dwa serduszka, cztery oczy"—Joanna Kulig	Zimna Wojna	Eliminated
Anna & Jan	30 (10,10,10)	Rumba	"Wkręceni (Nie ufaj mi)"—Igor Herbut	Wkręceni	Safe

=== Week 6: Wedding Party ===
Running order

Couple	Score	Dance	Music	Result
Mikołaj & Sylwia	19 (7,6,6)	Viennese Waltz	"Weź nie pytaj"—Paweł Domagała	Safe
Edyta & Michał	26 (10,8,8)	Jive	"Byłaś dla mnie wszystkim"—Poparzeni Kawą Trzy	Safe
Anna & Jan	28 (10,9,9)	Waltz	"Wielka miłość"—Seweryn Krajewski	Safe
Sylwia & Rafał	24 (9,8,7)	Quickstep	"Prawy do lewego"—Kayah & Goran Bregović	Safe
Julia & Stefano	30 (10,10,10)	Rumba	"Od dziś"—Paulla	Safe
Bogdan & Lenka	20 (9,5,6)	Samba	"Żono moja"—Masters	Safe
Milena & Jacek	22 (8,7,7)	Paso Doble	"A wszystko to... (bo ciebie kocham)"—Ich Troje	Eliminated
Julia & Stefano; Edyta & Michał; Mikołaj & Sylwia; Milena & Jacek; Anna & Jan; Sylwia & Rafał; Bogdan & Lenka	- - - - - 2 (-,1,1); 1 (1,-,-)	Improvisation	"Ona jest taka cudowna"—Piękni i Młodzi "Ruda tańczy jak szalona"—Czadoman "Jesteś szalona"—Boys	

=== Week 7: Family and Friends Dances ===
Running order

Couple	Score	Dance	Music	Result
Sylwia & Rafał (Daniel Lipka)	-	Samba	"24K Magic"—Bruno Mars	Safe
Sylwia & Rafał (Daniel Lipka)	26 (10,8,8)	Waltz	"You Raise Me Up"—Josh Groban	Safe
Mikołaj & Sylwia (Marcel Jędruszczak)	-	Jive	"Don't Stop Me Now"—Queen	Eliminated
Mikołaj & Sylwia (Marcel Jędruszczak)	22 (9,7,6)	Foxtrot	"Fly Me to the Moon"—Frank Sinatra	Eliminated
Anna & Jan (Oliwia Zielińska)	1 (-,-,1)	Samba	"Superhero"—Viki Gabor	Safe
Anna & Jan (Oliwia Zielińska)	28 (10,9,9)	Contemporary	"I Don't Want to Miss a Thing"—Aerosmith	Safe
Julia & Stefano (Teresa Vyšata)	1 (-,1,-)	Salsa	"Conga"—Gloria Estefan	Safe
Julia & Stefano (Teresa Vyšata)	29 (10,10,9)	Paso Doble	"Spanish Tango"—James Horner	Safe
Bogdan & Lenka (Katarzyna Kalus)	1 (1,-,-)	Waltz	"Moon River"—Audrey Hepburn	Safe
Bogdan & Lenka (Katarzyna Kalus)	20 (8,6,6)	Paso Doble	"Pride (In the Name of Love)"—U2	Safe
Edyta & Michał (Marcin Zając)	-	Samba	"Ona tańczy dla mnie"—Weekend	Safe
Edyta & Michał (Marcin Zając)	26 (10,8,8)	Foxtrot	"Już nie ma dzikich plaż"—Irena Santor	Safe

=== Week 8: Trio Challenge ===
On October 9, 2020, Polsat announced that for now they will be shooting show with no studio audience to protect the health and safety of the staff and crew.

Bogdan Kalus and his partner Lenka Klimentova withdrew from the competition as they were quarantining. Due to quarantine Jan Kliment, Anna Karwan's partner, was replaced by Kamil Kuroczko.

At the end of the show, the hosts announced that Sylwester Wilk and his partner Hanna Żudziewicz by decision of format owner will come back to the competition.

Running order

Couple	Score	Dance	Music	Result
Julia & Stefano (Agnieszka Sienkiewicz-Gauer)	27 (9,9,9)	Charleston	"Just a Gigolo"—David Lee Roth	Safe
Julia & Stefano (Agnieszka Sienkiewicz-Gauer)	30 (10,10,10)	Contemporary	"Someone You Loved"—Lewis Capaldi	Safe
Anna & Kamil (Olga Kalicka)	26 (9,8,9)	Samba	"Soul Bossa Nova"—Quincy Jones	Eliminated
Anna & Kamil (Olga Kalicka)	25 (9,8,8)	Foxtrot	"Girls Like You"—Maroon 5 ft. Cardi B	Eliminated
Edyta & Michał (Paweł Dudek)	30 (10,10,10)	Tango	"La cumparsita"—Gerardo Matos Rodríguez	Safe
Edyta & Michał (Paweł Dudek)	28 (10,9,9)	Cha-cha-cha	"Don't Start Now"—Dua Lipa	Safe
Sylwia & Rafał (Damian Kordas)	26 (9,8,9)	Samba	"Can't Take My Eyes Off You"—Frankie Valli	Safe
Sylwia & Rafał (Damian Kordas)	26 (9,9,8)	Tango	"Dobrze jest, jak jest"—Roksana Węgiel	Safe
Bogdan & Lenka (Mariusz Węgłowski)	—	Salsa	—	Withdrew
Bogdan & Lenka (Mariusz Węgłowski)	—	Foxtrot	"I Wanna Be Loved by You"—Marilyn Monroe	Withdrew

=== Week 9: Semifinal ===
Sylwia Lipka and Rafał Maserak withdrew from competition due to coronavirus infection.

Running order

Couple	Score	Dance	Music	Result
Edyta & Michał	25 (9,8,8)	Quickstep	"Forgive Me Friend"—Smith & Thell	Safe
Edyta & Michał	30 (10,10,10)	Rumba	"I'm Not the Only One"—Sam Smith	Safe
Julia & Stefano	30 (10,10,10)	Samba	"Whenever, Wherever"—Shakira	Safe
Julia & Stefano	29 (10,10,9)	Viennese Waltz	"Trędowata"—Wojciech Kilar	Safe
Sylwester & Hanna	25 (9,8,8)	Tango	"Wstaję"—Grzegorz Hyży & TABB	Eliminated
Sylwester & Hanna	25 (9,7,9)	Cha-cha-cha	"Can't Stop the Feeling"—Justin Timberlake	Eliminated
Sylwia & Rafał	—	Viennese Waltz	"Say Something"—A Great Big World ft. Christina Aguilera	Withdrew
Sylwia & Rafał	—	Cha-cha-cha	"Katchi"—Ofenbach	Withdrew

=== Week 10: Season Final ===
Running order

Couple	Score	Dance	Music	Result
Julia & Stefano (Michał Malitowski)	29 (10,10,9)	Jive	"Feel It Still"—Portugal. The Man	Runners-up
Julia & Stefano (Michał Malitowski)	30 (10,10,10)	Freestyle	"Song from a Secret Garden"—Secret Garden "Tanguera"—Mariano Mores	Runners-up
Julia & Stefano (Michał Malitowski)	30 (10,10,10)	Cha-cha-cha	"Cry to Me"—Solomon Burke	Runners-up
Edyta & Michał (Iwona Pavlović)	30 (10,10,10)	Tango	"I've Seen That Face Before (Libertango)"—Grace Jones	Winners
Edyta & Michał (Iwona Pavlović)	29 (10,10,9)	Freestyle	"Melodia"—Sanah	Winners
Edyta & Michał (Iwona Pavlović)	30 (10,10,10)	Viennese Waltz	"Say Something"—A Great Big World ft. Christina Aguilera	Winners

== Dance chart ==
The celebrities and professional partners danced one of these routines for each corresponding week:

- Week 1 (Season Premiere): Cha-cha-cha, Tango, Waltz, Jive
- Week 2: One unlearned dance (introducing Foxtrot, Quickstep, Samba, Viennese Waltz)
- Week 3: One unlearned dance
- Week 4 (Personal Stories): One unlearned dance (introducing Charleston, Contemporary, Rumba)
- Week 5 (Polish Movies Week): One unlearned dance
- Week 6 (Wedding Party): One unlearned dance (introducing Paso Doble) and dance improvisation
- Week 7 (Family and Friends Dances): One unlearned dance and one repeated dance (introducing Salsa)
  Julia & Stefano: Two unlearned dances
- Week 8 (Trio Challenge): One unlearned dance and one repeated dance
- Week 9 (Semifinal): One unlearned dance and one repeated dance
- Week 10 (Season Final): Judge's choice, Freestyle and couple's favourite dance of the season

Couple	1	2	3	4	5	6		7		8		9		10		
Edyta & Michał	Waltz	Samba	Tango	Rumba	Viennese Waltz	Jive	Improvisation	Samba	Foxtrot	Tango	Cha-cha-cha	Quickstep	Rumba	Tango	Freestyle	Viennese Waltz
Julia & Stefano	Cha-cha-cha	Tango	Jive	Viennese Waltz	Charleston	Rumba	Improvisation	Salsa	Paso Doble	Charleston	Contemporary	Samba	Viennese Waltz	Jive	Freestyle	Cha-cha-cha
Sylwester & Hanna	Waltz	Cha-cha-cha	Foxtrot	Contemporary								Tango	Cha-cha-cha			
Sylwia & Rafał	Jive	Foxtrot	Samba	Contemporary	Rumba	Quickstep	Improvisation	Samba	Waltz	Samba	Tango	Viennese Waltz	Cha-cha-cha			
Anna & Jan	Cha-cha-cha	Viennese Waltz	Samba	Tango	Rumba	Waltz	Improvisation	Samba	Contemporary	Samba	Foxtrot					
Bogdan & Lenka	Jive	Waltz	Cha-cha-cha	Foxtrot	Quickstep	Samba	Improvisation	Waltz	Paso Doble	Salsa	Foxtrot					
Mikołaj & Sylwia	Cha-cha-cha	Tango	Jive	Waltz	Samba	Viennese Waltz	Improvisation	Jive	Foxtrot							
Milena & Jacek	Tango	Cha-cha-cha	Waltz	Jive	Foxtrot	Paso Doble	Improvisation									
Nicole & Kamil	Jive	Quickstep	Cha-cha-cha	Charleston	Waltz											
Tomasz & Janja / Wiktoria	Waltz	Jive	Tango													
Marcin & Wiktoria	Tango	Jive														

Highest scoring dance
Lowest scoring dance
Performed, but not scored
Bonus points
Not performed due to withdrawal
Gained bonus points for winning this dance-off
Gained no bonus points for losing this dance-off

== Guest performances ==
Date	Artist(s)	Song(s)	Dancers
6 March 2020	Tomasz Szymuś's Orchestra	"The Rhythm of the Night"	All professional dancers, celebrities and judges
6 March 2020	Natalia Szroeder	"Lustra"	Sylwia Lipka & Rafał Maserak
13 March 2020	Sami Harb	"If I Can't Have You"	Sylwester Wilk & Hanna Żudziewicz
4 September 2020	Tomasz Szymuś's Orchestra	"Came Here for Love"	All professional dancers, celebrities and judges
11 September 2020
11 September 2020	Golec uOrkiestra	"Górą Ty"	All professional dancers, celebrities and judges
11 September 2020	Marta Gałuszewska	"Halo"	Edyta Zając & Michał Bartkiewicz
11 September 2020	Antek Smykiewicz	"Jej portret"	Mikołaj Jędruszczak & Sylwia Madeńska
18 September 2020	Tomasz Szymuś's Orchestra	"Na pewno"	All professional dancers, celebrities and judges
18 September 2020	Kuba Sienkiewicz	"Co ja robię tu?"	Bogdan Kalus & Lenka Klimentova
18 September 2020	Anna Dereszowska & Mikołaj Roznerski	"Porady na zdrady (Dreszcze)"	Mikołaj Jędruszczak & Sylwia Madeńska
18 September 2020	Igor Herbut	"Wkręceni (Nie ufaj mi)"	Anna Karwan & Jan Kliment
25 September 2020	Sławomir & Kajra	"Weselny pyton"	All professional dancers, celebrities and judges
25 September 2020	Sławomir & Kajra	"Miłość w Zakopanem"	—
25 September 2020	Poparzeni Kawą Trzy	"Byłaś dla mnie wszystkim"	Edyta Zając & Michał Bartkiewicz
25 September 2020	Paweł Jasionowski	"Żono moja"	Bogdan Kalus & Lenka Klimentova
25 September 2020	Michał Wiśniewski	"A wszystko to... (bo ciebie kocham)"	Milena Rostkowska-Galant & Jacek Jeschke
16 October 2020	Sabina Jeszka, Karolina Leszko, Kuba Krupski, Sami Harb	"I Wanna Dance with Somebody (Who Loves Me)"	—
16 October 2020	Paulla		—
23 October 2020	Kayah & Viki Gabor	"Ramię w ramię"	VOLT dance group
23 October 2020	Sylwia Grzeszczak	"Małe rzeczy"	—

== Rating figures ==
Date	Episode	Official rating 4+	Share 4+	Official rating 16–49	Share 16–49	Official rating 16–59	Share 16–59
6 March 2020	1	1 893 503	13.25%	474 980	9.58%	776 176	10.39%
13 March 2020	2	1 965 091	12.92%	640 791	11.30%	923 496	11.15%
4 September 2020	3						
11 September 2020	4						
18 September 2020	5						
25 September 2020	6	1 832 806	13.65%				
2 October 2020	7	1 839 253	13.37%				
9 October 2020	8						
16 October 2020	9						
23 October 2020	10	2 043 568	14.48%				
Average	Spring/Fall 2020	1 742 112	12.91%	423 590	9.09%	654 355	9.50%
