= Tibi et Igni =

- Cover art by Joe Petagno

Studio album by Vader
- Released: 30 May 2014
- Recorded: December 2013 – February 2014
- Studio: Hertz (Białystok, Poland)
- Genre: Death metal
- Length: 42:02
- Language: English, Polish, German
- Label: Nuclear Blast
- Producer: Wojtek and Sławek Wiesławscy

Vader chronology
| Go to Hell (2014) | Tibi et Igni (2014) | The Empire (2016) |

Singles from Tibi et Igni
- 1. "Where Angels Weep" Released: 18 April 2014

Professional ratings
Review scores
| Source | Rating |
|---|---|
| All About the Rock | 7/10 stars |
| About.com | 4/5 stars |
| SLUG Magazine | mixed |
| Teraz Rock | 4/5 stars |

Tibi et Igni is the tenth studio album by Polish death metal band Vader. It was released on 30 May 2014 through Nuclear Blast. The album was recorded by the Wiesławski brothers at Hertz Studio in Białystok, Poland. The album was preceded by the 7-inch EP Go to Hell, which was released on 18 April 2014.

Tibi et Igni is the first album to feature British drummer James Stewart, who replaced Pawel "Paul" Jaroszewicz in 2011.

== Background ==
During an interview in February 2013, frontman Piotr "Peter" Wiwczarek announced that Vader had begun working on a new studio album with the working title Straight to Hell, which was set to be released in late 2013. In May 2013, Wiwczarek announced that Vader planned to enter the studio in December to record its upcoming album, which was set to be released in early 2014.

On 7 December 2013, it was announced that Vader had entered Hertz Studio in Białystok, Poland and had begun recording a new album, with a new working title, Tibi et Igni, which is a Latin phrase that means "For You and Fire". The band had planned to record 14 new songs and 4 bonus tracks, and revealed possible song titles, including "Abandon All Hope", "Bring Them to Me" and "Infernal Poetry".

On 29 December, Wiwczarek announced that tracking for the album would be completed by the end of January 2014, and the album would be completed by February. He also announced the album should be released by April or May 2014. On 7 March 2014, Vader announced that the band had finished recording the album, and that it will be released on 30 May 2014, through Nuclear Blast.

On 27 March, Vader released a teaser for Tibi et Igni. On 16 April, a lyric video for the song "Where Angels Weep" was released.

== Release ==
Tibi et Igni is available as a standard CD, as a digipak CD with 2 bonus tracks, as a colored LP with a bonus 7-inch EP (including 2 bonus tracks), and exclusively through Nuclear Blast mailorder as a limited digipak edition with a signed Vader tourbook. The album features artwork from Joe Petagno, best known for his artwork for bands including Motörhead, Pink Floyd and Led Zeppelin.

The album reached number 18 on the US Billboard Top New Artist Albums (Heatseekers), selling around 1500 copies in two weeks. In Poland, Tibi et Igni landed at number 16, and dropped out two weeks later. The release also charted in France, Japan, Switzerland, and Germany.

To promote the album, Vader released three track by track videos.

== Track listing ==
| No. | Title | Length |
|---|---|---|
| 1. | "Go to Hell" | 4:37 |
| 2. | "Where Angels Weep" | 2:19 |
| 3. | "Armada on Fire" | 3:51 |
| 4. | "Triumph of Death" | 3:46 |
| 5. | "Hexenkessel" | 5:29 |
| 6. | "Abandon All Hope" | 2:24 |
| 7. | "Worms of Eden" | 3:35 |
| 8. | "The Eye of the Abyss" | 6:45 |
| 9. | "The Light Reaper" | 4:29 |
| 10. | "The End" | 4:56 |
| Total length: | | 42:02 |

Digipak bonus tracks
| No. | Title | Length |
|---|---|---|
| 11. | "Necropolis" | 4:16 |
| 12. | "Des Satans neue Kleider" (Das Ich cover) | 4:45 |
| Total length: | | 51:03 |

Bonus 7-inch
| No. | Title | Length |
|---|---|---|
| 1. | "Necropolis" | 4:16 |
| 2. | "Przeklęty na wieki" (Cursed Eternally) | 6:36 |
| Total length: | | 10:52 |

== Personnel ==
Production and performance credits taken from album liner notes.

=== Vader ===
- Piotr "Peter" Wiwczarek – vocals, lead guitar
- Marek "Spider" Pająk – rhythm guitar
- Tomasz "Hal" Halicki – bass
- James Stewart – drums

=== Additional musicians ===
- Marta Gabriel (Crystal Viper) – female vocals ("Przeklęty na wieki (Cursed Eternally)")

=== Production ===
- Wojtek and Sławek Wiesławscy – production, mixing, mastering, recording (at Hertz Recording Studio, Białystok, Poland, December 2013-February 2014)
- Piotr Polak – sound engineering assistance
- Joe Petagno – cover art
- Mariusz Kmiołek – management
- Adam Sieklicki, Robert Zembrzycki, Stefano Catalani – photography

== "Where Angels Weep" ==
"Where Angels Weep" is the ninth single by Vader. It was released on 18 April 2014 by Nuclear Blast.

=== Track listing ===
All lyrics are written by Harry Maat and Piotr Wiwczarek; all music is composed by Piotr Wiwczarek.

| No. | Title | Length |
|---|---|---|
| 1. | "Where Angels Weep (Demo version)" | 2:18 |

== Charts ==
| Chart (2014) | Peak position |
|---|---|
| Polish Albums (ZPAV) | 16 |
| German Albums (Offizielle Top 100) | 55 |
| Swiss Albums (Schweizer Hitparade) | 63 |
| Belgian Albums (Ultratop Flanders) | 187 |
| French Albums (SNEP) | 145 |
| Japanese Albums (Oricon) | 183 |
| UK Rock & Metal Albums (OCC) | 34 |
| US Top Heatseekers (Billboard) | 18 |

== Release history ==
| Formats | Region | Date | Label |
|---|---|---|---|
| CD, LP + 7-inch EP | Europe | 30 May 2014 | Nuclear Blast |
| CD, LP + 7-inch EP | UK, France | 2 June 2014 | Nuclear Blast |
| CD, LP + 7-inch EP | Poland | June 2, 2014 | Nuclear Blast/Warner Music Poland |
| CD | South Korea | June 2, 2014 | Nuclear Blast/Evolution Music |
| CD | Russia | June 2, 2014 | Nuclear Blast/Soyuz Music |
| CD | Japan | 4 June 2014 | Avalon Marquee |
| CD, LP + 7-inch EP | North America | 10 June 2014 | Nuclear Blast |
| CD | Mexico | 10 June 2014 | Nuclear Blast/Scarecrow Records |
