= Go to Hell (EP) =

EP by Vader
- Released: 18 April 2014
- Recorded: December 2013 – February 2014
- Studio: Hertz Studio in Białystok, Poland
- Genre: Death metal
- Length: 6:03
- Label: Nuclear Blast
- Producer: Wojtek and Sławek Wiesławscy

Vader chronology
Welcome to the Morbid Reich (2011)	Go to Hell (2014)	Tibi et Igni (2014)

Go to Hell is a 7-inch EP (Note: Based on sticker on the back cover of release. Go to Hell has been referred to both as an EP and as a single by official sources.) by Polish death metal band Vader, containing two tracks from Tibi et Igni. The song "Where Angels Weep" was also released digitally. Both were released on April 18, 2014, through Nuclear Blast. There is a slight difference in mixing between Go to Hell and Tibi et Igni: the second guitar solo in "Where Angels Weep" was performed by Marek "Spider" Pająk, while on the album all guitars were performed by Piotr "Peter" Wiwczarek.

The song "Where Angels Weep" is based on conflict between good and evil, while the lyrics for "Triumph of Death" were inspired by Pieter Bruegel the Elder's painting The Triumph of Death (1562).

== Track listing ==
No.	Title	Length
1.	"Where Angels Weep"	2:18
2.	"Triumph of Death"	3:46
Total length:		6:03

== Personnel ==
=== Vader ===
- Piotr "Peter" Wiwczarek – lead vocals, guitars
- Marek "Spider" Pająk – guitars
- Tomasz "Hal" Halicki – bass guitar
- James Stewart – drums

=== Production ===
- Wojtek and Sławek Wiesławscy – production, mixing, mastering, recording (at Hertz Recording Studio, Białystok, Poland, December 2013 – February 2014)
- Piotr Polak – sound engineering assistance
- Mariusz Kmiołek – management

== Release history ==
Date	Catalogue No	Formats	Label	Region
April 18, 2014	NB 3343-1	7-inch white vinyl	Nuclear Blast	North America/Europe
April 18, 2014	NB 3343-1	7-inch red vinyl	Nuclear Blast	North America/Europe
April 18, 2014	NB 3343-1	7-inch black vinyl	Nuclear Blast	North America/Europe
