= List of number-one singles of 2019 (Poland) =

This is a list of the songs that reached number-one position in official Polish single chart in ZPAV in 2019.

== Chart history ==
Issue date	Song	Artist(s)	Reference(s)
January 5	"High Hopes"	Panic! at the Disco	
January 12	"High Hopes"	Panic! at the Disco	
January 19	"Sweet but Psycho"	Ava Max	
January 26	"Survive"	Don Diablo featuring Emeli Sandé and Gucci Mane	
February 2	"Survive"	Don Diablo featuring Emeli Sandé and Gucci Mane	
February 9	"Zaskakuj mnie"	Marcin Sójka	
February 16	"Freed from Desire"	Drenchill featuring Indiiana	
February 23	"Freed from Desire"	Drenchill featuring Indiiana	
March 2	"Freed from Desire"	Drenchill featuring Indiiana	
March 9	"Freed from Desire"	Drenchill featuring Indiiana	
March 16	"Freed from Desire"	Drenchill featuring Indiiana	
March 23	"Freed from Desire"	Drenchill featuring Indiiana	
March 30	"Forgive Me Friend"	Smith & Thell featuring Swedish Jam Factory	
April 6	"Freed from Desire"	Drenchill featuring Indiiana	
April 13	"Au Au"	Filatov & Karas	
April 20	"Au Au"	Filatov & Karas	
April 27	"So Am I"	Ava Max	
May 4	"So Am I"	Ava Max	
May 11	"So Am I"	Ava Max	
May 18	"So Am I"	Ava Max	
May 25	"So Am I"	Ava Max	
June 1	"Obsessed"	Dynoro and Ina Wroldsen	
June 8	"Obsessed"	Dynoro and Ina Wroldsen	
June 15	"Trofea"	Dawid Podsiadło	
June 22	"Trofea"	Dawid Podsiadło	
June 29	"Trofea"	Dawid Podsiadło	
July 6	"Za krokiem krok"	Cleo	
July 13	"Trofea"	Dawid Podsiadło	
July 20	"Trofea"	Dawid Podsiadło	
July 27	"Trofea"	Dawid Podsiadło	
August 3	"Trofea"	Dawid Podsiadło	
August 10	"Señorita"	Shawn Mendes and Camila Cabello	
August 17	"Señorita"	Shawn Mendes and Camila Cabello	
August 24	"Señorita"	Shawn Mendes and Camila Cabello	
August 31	"Señorita"	Shawn Mendes and Camila Cabello	
September 7	"Señorita"	Shawn Mendes and Camila Cabello	
September 14	"On the Beach"	Jubël	
September 21	"Hej Hej!"	Daria Zawiałow	
September 28	"Hej Hej!"	Daria Zawiałow	
October 5	"Hej Hej!"	Daria Zawiałow	
October 12	"Hej Hej!"	Daria Zawiałow	
October 19	"Najnowszy klip"	Dawid Podsiadło	
October 26	"Najnowszy klip"	Dawid Podsiadło	
November 2	"Dance Monkey"	Tones and I	
November 9	"Czułe miejsce"	Baranovski	
November 16	"Najnowszy klip"	Dawid Podsiadło	
November 23	"Some Say"	Nea	
November 30	"Some Say"	Nea	
December 7	"Some Say"	Nea	
December 14	"Superhero"	Viki Gabor	
December 21	"Liar"	Camila Cabello	
December 28	"Liar"	Camila Cabello	

== Number-one artists ==
Position	Artist	Weeks at #1
1	Dawid Podsiadło	10
2	Drenchill	7
2	Indiiana (as featuring)	7
2	Camila Cabello	7
3	Ava Max	6
4	Shawn Mendes	5
5	Daria Zawiałow	4
6	Nea	3
7	Panic! at the Disco	2
7	Don Diablo	2
7	Emeli Sandé (as featuring)	2
7	Gucci Mane (as featuring)	2
7	Filatov & Karas	2
7	Dynoro	2
7	Ina Wroldsen	2
8	Marcin Sójka	1
8	Smith & Thell	1
8	Swedish Jam Factory (as featuring)	1
8	Cleo	1
8	Jubël	1
8	Tones and I	1
8	Baranovski	1
8	Viki Gabor	1

== See also ==
- Polish Music Charts
- List of number-one albums of 2019 (Poland)
