= List of number-one albums of 2019 (Poland) =

This is a list of number-one albums of 2019 in Poland, per the OLiS chart.

== Chart history ==
Issue date	Album	Artist(s)	Reference
January 3	Czerwony dywan	Paluch	
January 10	The Best of 2018	Various artists	
January 17	The Platinum Collection: Greatest Hits I, II & III	Queen	
January 24	Randka w ciemność	Nocny Kochanek	
January 31	Siesta XIV	Various artists	
February 7	A Star Is Born	Lady Gaga and Bradley Cooper	
February 14	Smooth Jazz Cafe 18	Various artists	
February 21	A Star Is Born	Lady Gaga and Bradley Cooper	
February 28	Wojtek Sokół	Sokół	
March 7	Instrukcja obsługi świrów	O.S.T.R.	
March 14	Widmo	PRO8L3M	
March 21	Widmo	PRO8L3M	
March 28	Plansze	Jan-rapowanie and Nocny	
April 4	Montana Max	W.E.N.A.	
April 11	Miłość, szmaragd i krokodyl	Donguralesko and Matheo	
April 18	The Essential Leonard Cohen	Leonard Cohen	
April 25	The Essential Leonard Cohen	Leonard Cohen	
May 2	The Best of Andrea Bocelli: Vivere	Andrea Bocelli	
May 9	The Best of Andrea Bocelli: Vivere	Andrea Bocelli	
May 16	Karmagedon	Tede and Sir Michu	
May 23	Inna wizja	Jano Polska Wersja	
May 30	Rammstein	Rammstein	
June 6	Dobrze, że jesteś	Zbigniew Wodecki	
June 13	BSNT	Rest and Kafar	
June 20	Chudy chłopak	Kali and Magiera	
June 27	Poeci polskiej piosenki: Nosowska – Jeśli wiesz co chcę powiedzieć...	Nosowska	
July 4	Poeci polskiej piosenki: Nosowska – Jeśli wiesz co chcę powiedzieć...	Nosowska	
July 11	Metryka	Małach and Rufuz	
July 18	Bravo Hits: Lato 2019	Various artists	
July 25	Hospodi	Batushka	
August 1	The Essential	Whitney Houston	
August 8	Mój Empik – moja muzyka: Muzyka polska. Volume 5	Various artists	
August 15	Dom na skraju niczego	Kartky	
August 22	Pocztówka z WWA, lato '19	Taco Hemingway	
August 29	Pocztówka z WWA, lato '19	Taco Hemingway	
September 5	Pocztówka z WWA, lato '19	Taco Hemingway	
September 12	Pierwszy dzień po końcu świata	Sarius	
September 19	Afirmacja	Kamerzysta	
September 26	Mr KęKę	KęKę	
October 3	G.O.A.T.	Peja and Slums Attack	
October 10	Muzyka współczesna	Pezet	
October 17	Elwis Picasso	Ero	
October 24	Alma Mater	Shellerini	
October 31	Muzyka filmowa	Krzysztof Komeda	
November 7	Małomiasteczkowy	Dawid Podsiadło	
November 14	Małomiasteczkowy	Dawid Podsiadło	
November 21	Małomiasteczkowy	Dawid Podsiadło	
November 28	Męskie Granie 2019	Various artists	
December 5	Męskie Granie 2019	Various artists	
December 12	Opowieści z Doliny Smoków	Bedoes and Lanek	
December 19	Chillwagon	Chillwagon	

== See also ==
- List of number-one singles of 2019 (Poland)
