= Thy Messenger =

EP by Vader
- Released: 31 May 2019
- Genre: Death metal
- Length: 13:23
- Label: Nuclear Blast

Vader chronology
The Empire (2016)	Thy Messenger (2019)	Solitude in Madness (2020)

Thy Messenger is an extended play by the Polish death metal band Vader. The EP was released 31 May 2019 through Nuclear Blast.

== Track listing ==
All tracks written by Vader except Steeler, written by Tipton, Halford, and Downing.

No.	Title	Writer(s)	Length
1.	"Grand Deceiver"		2:14
2.	"Litany"		3:09
3.	"Emptiness"		2:38
4.	"Despair"		1:18
5.	"Steeler" (Judas Priest cover)	Tipton, Halford, Downing	4:04
Total length:			13:23

== Reception ==
Writing for Metal Injection, Matthew Castleman wrote, "Vader still loves being Vader," and rated the EP an 8 out of 10. Metal Report called the release "merciless" and rated it an 8.5 out of 10. Writing for Metal Temple, Ross Donald called the EP "almost perfect", rating it a 9 out of 10.

Professional ratings
Review scores
Source	Rating
Metal Injection	8/10 stars
Metal Report	8.5/10 stars
Metal Temple	9/10 stars

== Lineup ==
- Piotr Wiwczarek – lead vocals, lead guitar
- Marek Pajak – rhythm guitar
- Tomasz Halicki – bass
- James Stewart – drums

== Charts ==
Chart (2019)	Peak position
Polish Albums (ZPAV)	33
