= Necropolis (album) =

- Cover art by Jacek Wiśniewski

Studio album by Vader
- Released: 21 August 2009
- Recorded: 2009, Hertz Studio, Białystok, Poland
- Genre: Death metal
- Length: 31:11
- Label: Nuclear Blast
- Producer: Tue Madsen

Vader chronology
Impressions in Blood (2006)	Necropolis (2009)	Welcome to the Morbid Reich (2011)

Singles from Necropolis
- 1. "We Are The Horde" Released: 1 September 2009

Professional ratings
Review scores
Source	Rating
About.com	4/5 stars
AllMusic	4/5 stars
Blabbermouth	7.5/10 stars
Chronicles of Chaos	7/10 stars
Blistering	9/10 stars
Teraz Rock	4/5 stars
Exclaim!	favorable

Necropolis is the eighth studio album by the Polish death metal band Vader. The album was released on 21 August 2009 by Nuclear Blast. The album was nominated for a Fryderyk Award in the category 'Heavy Metal Album of the Year (Album roku heavy metal)'. On 8 April 2009, Vader released the first part of their studio report for the album. Subsequently, the second part was released on 22 April, and the third part was released on 27 May.

Necropolis was recorded between March and April 2009 at Hertz Studio in Białystok, Poland, and was produced by Tue Madsen. Mixing and mastering for the album took place at Antfarm Studio in Denmark by Madsen, except the songs "The Seal" and "Summoning the Futura", which were mixed at VooDoo Gates Studio in Olsztyn, Poland. Necropolis is the first Vader release that features drummer Paweł "Paul" Jaroszewicz. A video was shot for the song "Never Say My Name", which is based partially on the book "The Gospel According To Satan" by Patrick Graham. Piotr "Peter" Wiwczarek talked about working on the set for videoclip, saying:

We started the video shooting on August 15, at about noon. That day we were in for the Last Supper and the slaughter of the Messiah's followers shots, while during the night we were to take some bluebox and Janus shots. [...] The next day we took the martyr shots and the Romans' armament ones, which were crucial for 'Necropolis'. Sunday. [...] It wasn't so easy that day... The owner of the place, who at first was eager to rent it to the Inbornmedia crew, found it enough when it came to the crucifixion, burning and the transformation of the Messiah into Janus. My roars and the burying crucifix brought about an immediate response of the security guards. They called the police and we were supposed to leave the gravel pit at once... Fortunately, we managed to 'steal' one more hour before the cops arrived.

The album sold around 1,130 copies in the United States in its first week of release, according to Nielsen SoundScan. The album reached number 19 on the Billboard Top New Artist Albums (Heatseekers). In Poland, Necropolis landed at position No. 5, and dropped out five weeks later. The album also charted in France and Germany.

== Track listing ==
No.	Title	Lyrics	Music	Length
1.	"Devilizer"	Piotr Wiwczarek	Piotr Wiwczarek	3:19
2.	"Rise of the Undead"	Piotr Wiwczarek	Piotr Wiwczarek	3:52
3.	"Never Say My Name"	Piotr Wiwczarek	Piotr Wiwczarek	2:01
4.	"Blast"	Piotr Wiwczarek	Piotr Wiwczarek	1:50
5.	"The Seal"		Piotr Wiwczarek	2:10
6.	"Dark Heart"	Harry Maat	Piotr Wiwczarek	2:59
7.	"Impure"	Harry Maat	Piotr Wiwczarek	3:40
8.	"Summoning the Futura"		Piotr Wiwczarek	1:05
9.	"Anger"	Piotr Wiwczarek	Piotr Wiwczarek	2:14
10.	"We Are the Horde"	Harry Maat	Piotr Wiwczarek	3:10
11.	"When the Sun Drowns in Dark"	Harry Maat	Piotr Wiwczarek	7:06
Total length:				33:26

Bonus Tracks
No.	Title	Lyrics	Music	Length
12.	"Black Metal" (Venom cover)	Conrad Lant	Tony Bray, Jeff Dunn, Conrad Lant	3:13
13.	"Fight Fire with Fire" (Metallica cover)	James Hetfield	James Hetfield, Cliff Burton, Lars Ulrich	4:05
14.	"Rise Of The Undead" (early edition)	Piotr Wiwczarek	Piotr Wiwczarek	3:52
15.	"Impure" (early edition)	Harry Maat	Piotr Wiwczarek	3:40

Special edition DVD
No.	Title	Lyrics	Music	Length
1.	"Crucified Ones"	Piotr Wiwczarek	Piotr Wiwczarek	3:57
2.	"Black to the Blind"	Paweł Wasilewski	Piotr Wiwczarek	4:38
3.	"The Epitaph"	Łukasz Szurmiński	Piotr Wiwczarek	3:56
4.	"Carnal"	Paweł Frelik	Piotr Wiwczarek	2:34
5.	"Wings"	Paweł Frelik	Piotr Wiwczarek	3:51
6.	"This is the War"	Piotr Wiwczarek	Piotr Wiwczarek	4:04
7.	"Lead Us!!!"	Piotr Wiwczarek	Maurycy Stefanowicz	3:13

== Personnel ==
Production and performance credits are adapted from the album liner notes.

Vader

- Piotr "Peter" Wiwczarek – lead vocals, lead guitar, bass
- Paweł "Paul" Jaroszewicz – drums
- Tomasz "Reyash" Rejek – bass (only on bonus DVD)
- Wacław "Vogg" Kiełtyka – rhythm guitar (only on bonus DVD)

Additional musicians

- Marek Pająk – rhythm guitar (tracks 3, 9, 11, 13)
- Bartłomiej Krysiuk (Hermh) – backing vocals on "Black Metal"
- Maciej Taff – lead vocals on "Fight Fire with Fire"

Production

- Tue Madsen – production, mastering
- Wojtek & Sławek Wiesławscy – sound engineering
- Piotr "Peter" Wiwczarek – lyrics
- Harry Maat – lyrics
- Jacek Wiśniewski – artwork
- Maciej Pawełczyk – production (DVD)
- Jakub Jakielaszek – editing, postproduction (DVD)
- Bartosz Chmielewski – audio recording, mixing (DVD)

Note

- Recorded at Hertz Studio, Białystok, Poland, March–April 2009.
- Mixed at Antfarm Studio, Aabyhoej, Denmark, May 2009.
- Mastered at Antfarm Studio, Aabyhoej, Denmark, May 2009.
- Tracks 5 & 8 recorded at Hertz Studio, Białystok, Poland, March–April 2009.
- Mixed at VooDoo Gates Studio, Olsztyn, Poland, May 2009.

== "We Are the Horde" ==
"We Are the Horde" is the seventh single by the Polish death metal band Vader. It was released on 1 September 2009 by Nuclear Blast.

The single was also released on 7" picture disc as split with American death metal band Nile.

=== Track listing ===
No.	Title	Lyrics	Music	Length
1.	"We Are the Horde"	Harry Maat	Piotr Wiwczarek	3:10

== Charts ==
Chart (2009)	Peak position
Polish Albums Chart	5
German Albums Chart	64
French Albums Chart	188
US Billboard Top Heatseekers	36

== Release history ==
Formats	Region	Date	Label
CD, CD+DVD, LP	Europe	August 21, 2009	Nuclear Blast
CD	Russia	August 21, 2009	Nuclear Blast/Irond Records
CD	Mexico	August 21, 2009	Nuclear Blast/Scarecrow Records
CD, CD+DVD	Poland	24 August 2009	Nuclear Blast/Warner Music Poland
CD	Japan	26 August 2009	Avalon Marquee
CD, CD+DVD, LP	North America	22 September 2009	Nuclear Blast
