= Batushka =

Polish black metal band

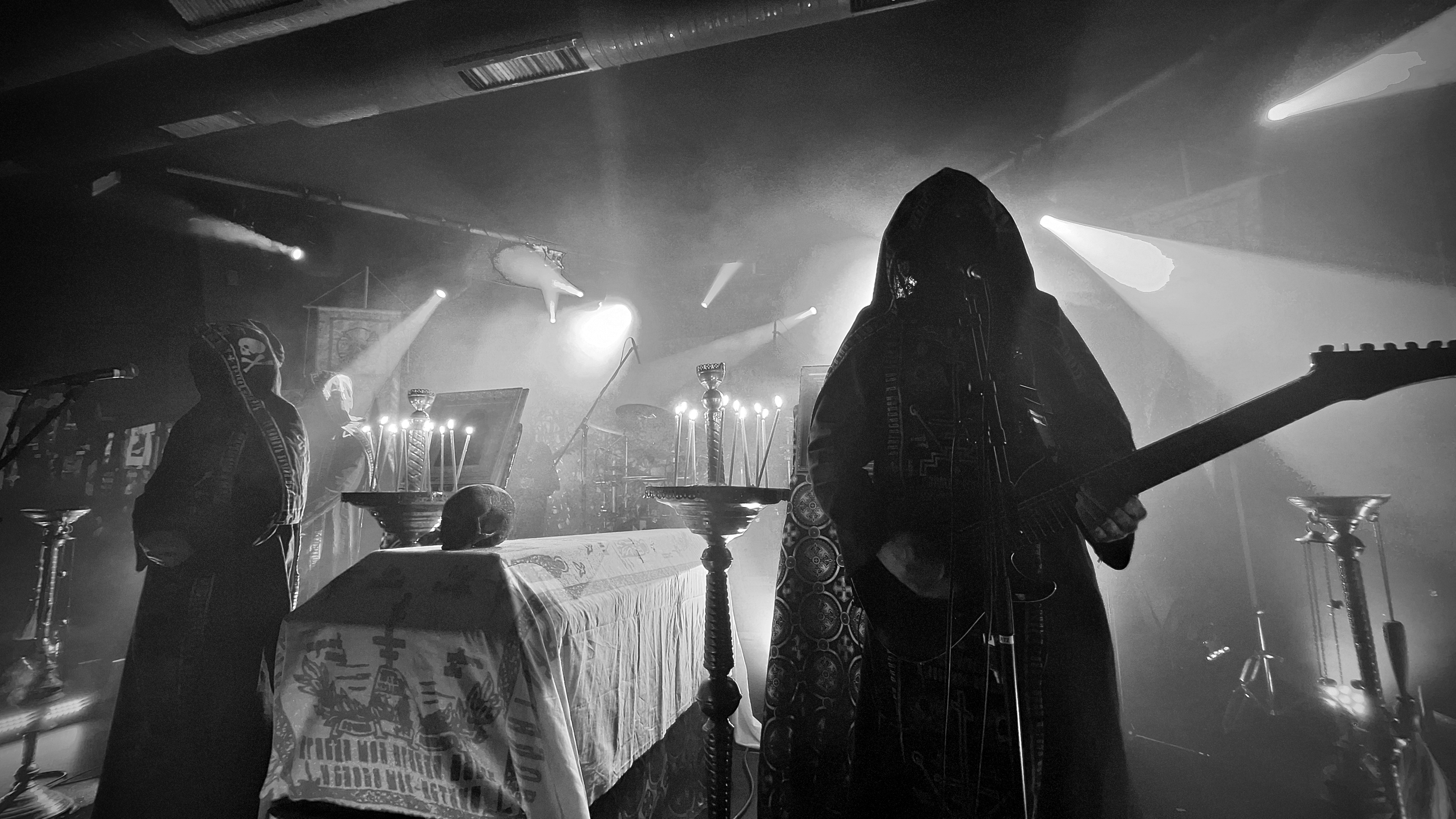
- Batushka performing in Sofia, Bulgaria 27.09.2025

Background information
- Origin: Białystok, Poland
- Genres: Black metal
- Years active: 2015–present
- Labels: Witching Hour, Sphieratz
- Members: Krzysztof Drabikowski

Batushka (Cyrillic spelling: Батюшка) is a Polish black metal band based in Białystok founded by Krzysztof Drabikowski in 2015. Their music and lyrics, which are written exclusively in Church Slavonic language, are inspired by the Eastern Orthodox Church. The band members wear religious habits and Eastern Orthodox schemas during live performances to conceal their identities. In contrast with many other black metal bands, they use eight-string guitars.

== Name ==
The word Batushka (Cyrillic: Батюшка), meaning "Father", is the titular equivalent of a hieromonk in Eastern Orthodoxy or, broadly, of any Orthodox priest.

== History ==
=== Formation and release of Litourgiya (2015–2017) ===
Batushka was founded in Białystok in the spring of 2015 by multi instrumentalist Krzysztof "Derph" Drabikowski at his studio Sphieratz in Sobolewo. Throughout the first quarter of 2015, Drabikowski proceeded to compose and record the music, write the lyrics, and paint the artwork for the album until deciding to bring Marcin Bielemuk to record the drum parts in acoustic percussion. Drabikowski originally invited his friend and former Heuresis bandmate, Lech, to do the vocal parts. Lech dropped out of the project because he did not know how to speak or write old Church Slavonic.

In July 2015, Drabikowski ran into Bartłomiej Krysiuk in a club in Białystok. Krysiuk was the vocalist for a band called 'Hermh", and was the owner of a Polish record label, "Witching Hour Productions". He and Drabikowski already knew each other, but it had been many years since either had seen the other. Krzysztof told Bart about his idea for Batushka, and eventually hired him to record the vocals. Krzysztof also hired Patrick Zimeer to record the choir vocals, along with himself. The album was completed in the following months and Drabikowski convinced Krysiuk, Zimeer, and Bielemuk to keep Batushka an anonymous project. According to Drabikowski, this was decided in order for the listeners to focus on the musical experience itself, as such and for the next year the band's line up remained unknown to the public and started using monikers in Cyrillic to further conceal their identities.

The group released the single "Yekteníya VII" in November 2015, through Krysiuk's label, Witching Hour Productions, prior to their debut album Литоургиіа ("Litourgiya"), which would also be released through Witching Hour in December. The album was critically acclaimed, with various sites naming Litourgiya one of the best metal albums of 2015, it also became a commercial hit in the Polish metal scene. The album's overwhelming success prompted the band to start touring due to massive demand from various European festivals. Because of the anonymity of the band, the only way anyone could reach out to the band was through Witching Hour Productions. Krzysztof hired Bart to be the manager, handling much of the bookings and would also deal with commissioning stage props, matching 8-string guitars for Krzysztof and another guitarist, costumes and scenography.

The band's live line-up featured a total of eight performers: Drabikowski on lead guitars, Krysiuk on lead vocals, and Bielemuk on drums alongside three backing vocalists, a bassist, and a rhythm guitarist. The band would have inter-changing live members throughout 2016–2018, depending on individual member's other commitments.

Following some regional touring, concerts in Russia and Belarus were also planned, but were canceled due to protests and alleged death threats made against them. This incident also ended the public anonymity of the band's core line up since Drabikowski started doing interviews explaining the situation.

In 2016, together with Behemoth and Bölzer, the group embarked on a concert tour in Poland called Rzeczpospolita Niewierna ("The Republic of the Unfaithful"). In 2017 they performed at Wacken Open Air and Brutal Assault.

=== Drabikowski vs Krysiuk (2017–2019) ===
In October 2017, Krysiuk along with some of the band members signed a record deal with Metal Blade Records in the US and re-released Litourgiya worldwide in both physical media and digital platforms. The signing of the band and the re-release however, were done without the involvement of Krzysztof Drabikowski.

In April 2018, Marcin Bielemuk (drummer) left the project for undisclosed reasons. A year later on 24 May 2019, Marcin stated on his personal Facebook that he was fired by Drabikowski. This was a result of Bielmuk criticizing Drabikowski's attitude and behaviour toward himself, Krysiuk and the rest of the band's live performers.

On 23 December 2018, Drabikowski announced via the Batushka Instagram account that he had decided to part ways with vocalist Bartłomiej Krysiuk "due to inappropriate behaviour on his part." In the same post, Drabikowski stated that "There were attempts to take my creation Batushka away from me" and "the upcoming album Панихида ("Requiem") will not feature his voice".

The following week, the post was taken down and a new post made by Krysiuk stated that Drabikowski "was told earlier this month that he would not participate in Batushka activities as we move into 2019" and that any pages operated by him were to be shut down based on claims "based on intellectual property and trademark ownership".

Refuting Krysiuk's claims, Drabikowski uploaded a video statement claiming that he has been pressured by him to release the new album and, when he disagreed, Krysiuk then "hired musicians to produce an album that he planned to release as the new Batushka record, behind [his] back". He also stated that he had decided to take legal actions, while being advised by his lawyer to not say anything further and that any pictures on the website and Facebook page were from Krysiuk and his team pretending to be Batushka.

=== Panihida, Hospodi & the two Batushkas (2019–2024) ===
In April 2019, Krysiuk shared court documents which stated that he had legal rights to perform and release music under the name 'Batushka'. Krysiuk announced Batushka would carry on without Drabikowski and it would consist of a lineup featuring the musicians (Drummer "Лех", Bassist "Дедушка", Guitarists "Artur" & "Тарлахан", and Choristers "Блажей" & "Хиацынтос") who had performed with the band during the first album tours. This group released its own recordings and began performing separately from Drabikowski, which caused confusion among fans who were unaware of the split and the existence of two bands using the Batushka name. Drabikowski protested the move claiming Krysiuk's band was not legitimate as Krysiuk maintained that Drabikowski did not own the rights over the name and concept of the band.

On 6 May 2019, Drabikowski released an update on the court proceedings, stating that the court decided that Bartłomiej Krysiuk cannot tour under the name "Batushka" or release new music under the moniker until the proceedings are over. Despite being told to stop touring under the name Batushka, Krysiuk scheduled tour dates from June 2019 and onwards. Krysiuk also stated that he had no intention of honoring the court's decision. A month later Krysiuk posted an update where his legal team succeeded appealing the ruling and obtained a reversal of the court's decision that forbade him from having his band being called "Batushka" and prevented him to tour and release merchandising while the case proceeds. However, Drabikowski was allowed to use the band name in various capacities in spite of Krysiuk's attempts to censor him through bans and takedowns on Bandcamp and other social media.

On 13 May 2019, Drabikowski's Batushka released a song through their own YouTube account from their upcoming album ПАНИХИДА ("Requiem"), called "Песнь I" ("Ode 1"). Meanwhile, Krysiuk's band released under the name Batushka a full-length album called ГОСПОДИ (Hospodi) ("Lord"), the album received mixed reviews from critics and was dismissed by some of the band's fans, with most of the criticism aimed at their illegitimacy to use the name Batushka.

Due to backlash from supporters of Drabikowski, the promotional videos for Hospodi had the likes/dislikes and comment sections disabled on Metal Blade's YouTube channel. Posts about Batushka on Metal Blade's Instagram also had their comments disabled to prevent similar violence-related comments and hate speech. These actions stirred even more backlash from Drabikowski's online fanbase, as they were not able to vent their frustrations and negative remarks.

On 27 May 2019, Drabikowski's Batushka released a new full-length album called ПАНИХИДА ("Panihida") ("Requiem") and was well received by both critics and fans alike.

Despite the public backlash, Krysiuk's version of the band continued to tour. On 6 September, Krysiuk's band uploaded a trailer for a documentary titled "Batushka: Uncovering the Truth", about the name dispute and the split between Krysiuk and Drabikowski. However, no further updates or a release date have been revealed since the first announcement.

=== Krzysztof Drabikowski's Batushka ===
After a prolonged silence, Krzysztof Drabikowski announced on 9 September 2019 that he will be performing Panihida live in its entirety with a new line up at the MonteRay Club in Kyiv on 9 November 2019, the performance was very well received and was reportedly a sold-out event for the venue. Drabikowski has also expressed his hopes of going on a proper tour in 2020. In late October, several dates were confirmed for Drabikowski band's European tour, and will take place in 2020, with confirmed dates in the Czech Republic, Austria and Germany. Drabikowski's Batushka also joined Malevolent Creation on their European tour from February to March 2020; the tour was a success with many sold-out venues, however the tour was cut short on 11 March, due to the COVID-19 pandemic, the band's scheduled performances at Poland were canceled due to safety concerns, and Krzysztof Drabikowski testing positive of COVID-19. He was also suffering from cardiac issues and was hospitalized but was able to recover.

On 19 January 2020 it was announced that Drabikowski's Batushka was going to perform at the fifth "México Metal Fest" at Monterrey on 14 November 2020, however the festival was postponed twice until September 23, 2022, and the band performed live as scheduled. Drabikowski's Batushka also performed at the Latvian ethnographic and crafts festival Zobens un Lemess on 7 to 9 August 2020 held in Bauska castle grounds. Since recovering from COVID, Drabikowski has been hinting at new Batushka music, sharing photos and videos on his social media.

Drabikowski's Batushka performed at the 70000 Tons of Metal cruise in January 2024, And they were part of Hellfest on 30 June 2024.

=== Drabikowski's Batushka & Krysiuk's Patriarkh ===
On May 29, 2024, the Polish courts ruled in favor of Krzysztof Drabikowski (in a first ruling instance), preventing Bartłomiej Krysiuk from using either the names "Batushka" or "БАТЮШКА" without the authorization of Drabikowski. On June 6, 2024, Drabikowski published a redacted version of the ruling on his social networks while thanking his fans. The same day Krysiuk, through the social networks of his version of Batushka, released a statement in which he was disappointed by the ruling. He has decided to appeal it and continue with his previous tour commitments until a final verdict is reached.

Shortly after March 2024, Krysiuk's band announced a new series of concerts. Those shows have been promoted as the "last shows of Batushka ever".

On September 9, 2024, Bartłomiej Krysiuk, through his band's social networks, announced they will no longer use the name "Batushka" and they will rebrand as Patriarkh (stylized in Cyrillic as Патриархь). The change was done after the last concert of their tour on December 13, 2024.

== Band members ==
*Batushka is a solo-project which features touring musicians whose tenure ranges from long-term status to short-term substitutes.

- Krzysztof "Derph" Drabikowski (Христофор)– Guitars, Vocals, Bass, Drums
- Witold Ustapiuk – Live Guitar
- Jacek Łazarow – Live Drums
- Kamil Popławski - Live Backing Vocals

Former Vocalists

- Bartłomiej Krysiuk (Варфоломей) – Lead Vocals (Litourgiya LP; 2015–2018)
- Lech (Лех) – Lead Vocals (Panihida LP; 2019–2023)
- Felix Weischer – Live Vocals (2023–2025)

Former Guitarists

- Paweł "P" Bartulewicz – Live Guitar (2016)
- Łukasz Bielemuk – Live Guitar (2016–2018)
- Marek P. – Live Guitar (2018)
- Artur Rumiński – Guitar (2017–2018)
- Dominik Prykiel (Домниос) – Guitar (2018)

Former Bassists

- Bartosz R. – Live Bass (2016–2018; 2021–2023)
- Artur Grassmann (Дедушка) – Live Bass (2017–2018)
- Chris Qtschier - Live Bass (2023–2025)

Former Drummers

- Marcin Bielemuk (Мартин) – Drums (Litourgiya LP; 2015–2018)
- Grzegorz Hiero – Live Drums (2018)
- Jacek Łazarow – Live Drums (2018)
- Krzysztof Klingbein – Live Drums (2018)
- Paweł Jaroszewicz – Live Drums (2018)

Former Backing Vocalists

- Paweł "Wdowa" Wdowski – Live Backing Vocals (2016)
- Kamil Popławski - Live Backing Vocals (2016–2017)
- Błażej Kasprzak (Блажей) – Live Backing Vocals (2016–2018)
- Jacek Wiśniewsky (Хиацынтос Яца) – Live Backing Vocals (2017–2018)
- Patrick Żimeer (Черный Монах) – Live Backing Vocals (2016–2023)

== Discography ==
Studio albums

- Litourgiya / Литоургиiа (Witching Hour Productions, 2015)
- Panihida / Панихида (Sphieratz Productions, 2019)

Singles

- Yekteníya VII / Ектения VII (Witching Hour Productions, 2015)
- Pesn' 1 / Песнь 1 (Sphieratz Productions, 2019)
