= Marek Pająk =

Polish musician

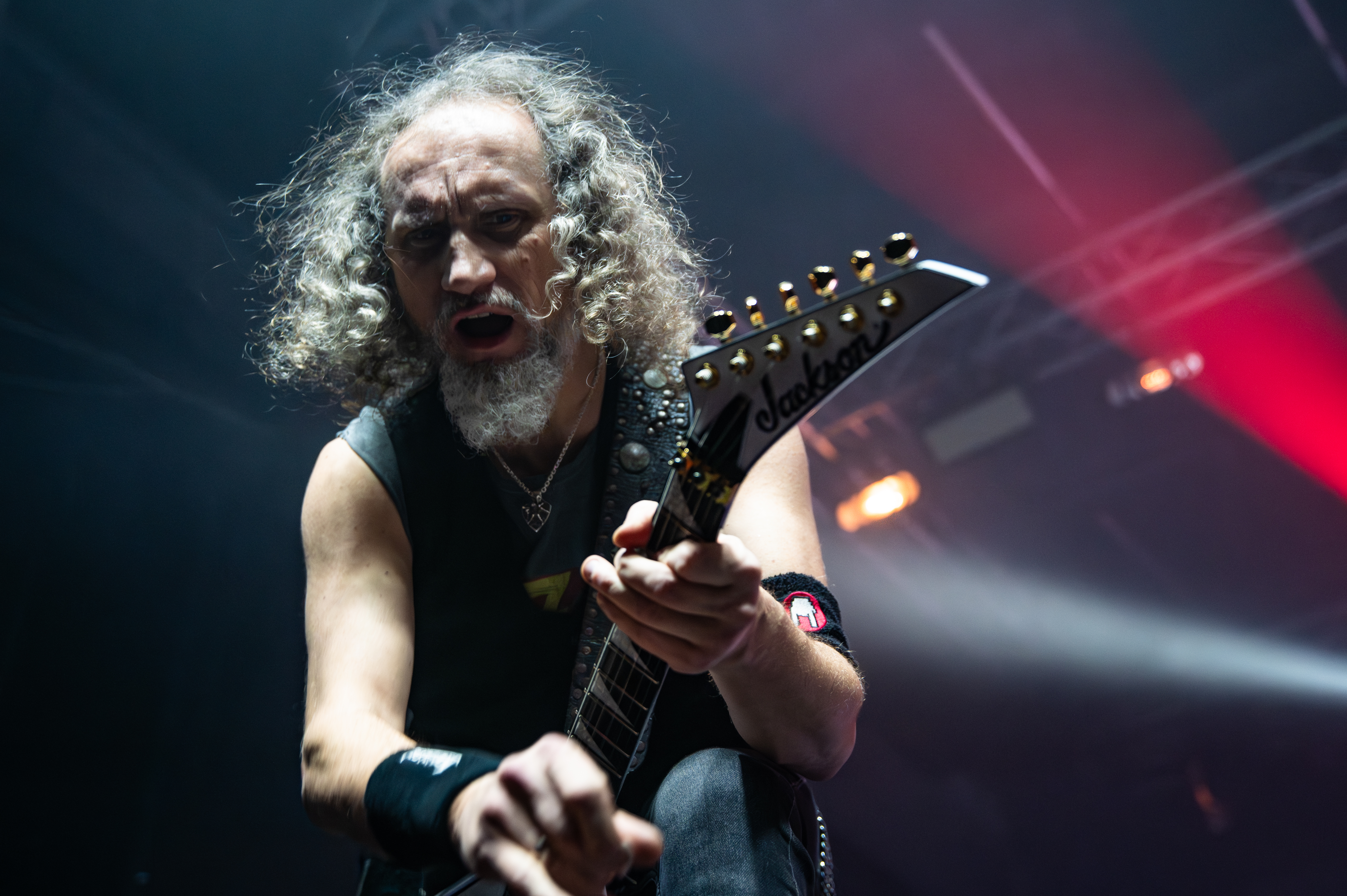
- Pajak in 2025

Background information
- Born: 26 November 1977 (age 48); Legnica, Poland
- Genres: Death metal
- Occupation: Musician
- Instruments: Guitar, bass guitar
- Years active: 1998–present
- Member of: Vader
- Formerly of: Esqarial, Amorphous, Panzer X

Marek Pająk (born 26 November 1977) is a Polish musician. In 2010, he joined death metal band Vader as their rhythm guitarist.

Pająk was endorsed by Ibanez and Schecter guitars. He currently uses Jackson Guitars, and DL David Laboga Cabinets.

== Discography ==
Esqarial

- Amorphous (1998, Propaganda Promotion)
- Discoveries (2001, Empire Records)
- Inheritance (2002, Empire Records)
- Klassika (2004, Empire Records)
- Burned Ground Strategy (2008, Propaganda Promotion)

Vader

- Necropolis (2009, Nuclear Blast, as guest)
- Welcome to the Morbid Reich (2011, Nuclear Blast)
- Go to Hell (EP, 2014, Nuclear Blast)
- Tibi et Igni (2014, Nuclear Blast)
- Future of the Past II – Hell in the East (2015, Witching Hour Productions)
- The Empire (2016, Nuclear Blast)
- Thy Messenger (EP, 2019, Nuclear Blast)
- Solitude in Madness (2020, Nuclear Blast)

Amorphous

- Return from the Dead (2008, Propaganda Promotion)
- Modus Operandi (2010, Propaganda Promotion)
- A Perfect Evil (2012, Let It Bleed Records)

Panzer X

- Steel Fist (EP, 2006, Metal Mind Productions)
