= Welcome to the Morbid Reich =

- Cover art by Zbigniew Bielak

Studio album by Vader
- Released: 12 August 2011
- Recorded: 2011, Hertz Studio, Białystok, Poland
- Genre: Death metal
- Length: 37:37
- Label: Nuclear Blast, Avalon Marquee
- Producer: Wojtek & Sławek Wiesławscy

Vader chronology
| Necropolis (2009) | Welcome to the Morbid Reich (2011) | Go to Hell (2014) |

Singles from Welcome to the Morbid Reich
- 1. "Come And See My Sacrifice" Released: 26 July 2011

Professional ratings
Review scores
| Source | Rating |
|---|---|
| Blistering | 9/10 stars |
| Blabbermouth | 8/10 stars |
| Chronicles of Chaos | 9.5/10 stars |
| Revolver | 4/5 stars |
| About.com | 3.5/5 stars |
| Teraz Rock | 4/5 stars |
| Sputnikmusic | 4/5 stars |
| Exclaim! | favorable |

Welcome to the Morbid Reich is the ninth studio album by the Polish death metal band Vader. The album was released on 12 August 2011 by Nuclear Blast. The release was preceded by a digital download single for the song "Come And See My Sacrifice", which was released on 26 July 2011. The album has won a Fryderyk Award in the category 'Heavy Metal Album of the Year (Album roku heavy metal)', and reached number 17 on the Billboard Top New Artist Albums (Heatseekers), and number 25 on the Hard Rock Albums. In Poland, Welcome to the Morbid Reich landed at number 6, and dropped out four weeks later. The release also charted in France, Japan, Switzerland, and Germany.

On 5 April 2011, Vader released the first part of their studio report for the album. Subsequently, the second part was released on 14 April, the third part was released on 30 April, the fourth part was released on 11 May, the fifth part was released on 24 May, and the sixth part was released on 7 June.

Welcome to the Morbid Reich was recorded between March and April 2011 at Hertz Studio in Białystok, Poland, and was produced by the Wiesławscy Brothers, and features cover artwork by Zbigniew Bielak. The album is the final Vader release to feature drummer Paweł "Paul" Jaroszewicz, and the first to feature guitarist Marek "Spider" Pająk as band member. Piotr "Peter" Wiwczarek described work on the album, saying:

In all, we spent about 4 weeks in the studio between March and June. We worked a bit differently as in previous sessions, because we made breaks between each part of recordings. I mean for the drums we took about 10 days, and then we made a week’s break, so we could think and work the guitar lines for the drums. And after the guitars we had a break to think about the vocal lines and all we had already done. And then a break before mixing, so we wanted to give a little bit of a rest for ears and mind, and to take the song recordings with the fresh ears.

== Track listing ==
| No. | Title | Lyrics | Music | Length |
|---|---|---|---|---|
| 1. | "Ultima Thule" (instrumental) | | Krzysztof Oloś | 0:48 |
| 2. | "Return to the Morbid Reich" | Harry Maat, Piotr Wiwczarek | Piotr Wiwczarek | 3:26 |
| 3. | "The Black Eye" | Piotr Wiwczarek | Piotr Wiwczarek | 4:12 |
| 4. | "Come and See My Sacrifice" | Piotr Wiwczarek | Marek Pająk | 4:44 |
| 5. | "Only Hell Knows" | Piotr Wiwczarek | Piotr Wiwczarek | 2:13 |
| 6. | "I Am Who Feasts Upon Your Soul" | Piotr Wiwczarek | Marek Pająk | 4:50 |
| 7. | "Don't Rip the Beast's Heart Out" | Piotr Wiwczarek | Piotr Wiwczarek | 3:58 |
| 8. | "I Had a Dream…" | Piotr Wiwczarek | Marek Pająk | 3:02 |
| 9. | "Lord of Thorns" | Harry Maat, Piotr Wiwczarek | Piotr Wiwczarek | 2:38 |
| 10. | "Decapitated Saints" (Re-recorded from The Ultimate Incantation) | Piotr Wiwczarek | Piotr Wiwczarek | 2:41 |
| 11. | "They're Coming…" (instrumental) | | Marek Pająk | 1:46 |
| 12. | "Black Velvet and Skulls of Steel" | Piotr Wiwczarek | Piotr Wiwczarek | 3:19 |
| Total length: | | | | 37:37 |

Bonus Tracks
| No. | Title | Lyrics | Music | Length |
|---|---|---|---|---|
| 13. | "Troops of Tomorrow" (The Vibrators cover) | Ian Carnochan | Ian Carnochan | 4:56 |
| 14. | "Raping the Earth" (Extreme Noise Terror cover) | Dean Jones, Phil Vane | Pete Hurley | 1:54 |

== Personnel ==
Production and performance credits are adapted from the album liner notes.

Vader

- Piotr "Peter" Wiwczarek – lead vocals, lead guitar, bass
- Marek "Spider" Pająk – rhythm guitar, bass
- Paweł "Paul" Jaroszewicz – drums

Additional musicians

- Krzysztof "Siegmar" Oloś – guest keyboards
- Harry Maat – guest backing vocals, lyrics

Production

- Wojtek & Sławek Wiesławscy – production, sound engineering, mixing, mastering
- MK (Optimal Media Production) – mastering (LP Edition)
- Rafał Konopka – sound engineering assistant
- Piotr "Peter" Wiwczarek – lyrics
- Zbigniew M. Bielak – cover art, layout
- Mariusz Kmiołek – management
- Takahisa Okuno – Japanese liner notes

Note

- Recorded, mixed & mastered at Hertz Recording Studio, Białystok, Poland, March–April 2011.

== "Come and See My Sacrifice" ==
"Come and See My Sacrifice" is the eight single by the Polish death metal band Vader. It was released on 26 July 2011 by Nuclear Blast.

=== Track listing ===
| No. | Title | Lyrics | Music | Length |
|---|---|---|---|---|
| 1. | "Come and See My Sacrifice" | Piotr Wiwczarek | Marek Pająk | 4:44 |
| 2. | "Come and See My Sacrifice" (demo version) | Piotr Wiwczarek | Marek Pająk | 4:43 |

== Charts ==
=== Weekly ===
| Chart (2011) | Peak position |
|---|---|
| Polish Albums Chart | 6 |
| German Albums Chart | 73 |
| Swiss Albums Chart | 94 |
| French Albums Chart | 154 |
| Japanese Albums Chart | 233 |
| US Billboard Top Heatseekers | 17 |
| US Billboard Hard Rock Albums | 25 |

=== Monthly ===
| Chart (2011) | Peak position |
|---|---|
| Poland (ZPAV Top 100) | 18 |

== Release history ==
| Formats | Region | Date | Label |
|---|---|---|---|
| CD, LP | Europe | August 12, 2011 | Nuclear Blast |
| CD | Russia | August 12, 2011 | Nuclear Blast/Irond Records |
| CD, LP | Poland | 15 August 2011 | Nuclear Blast/Warner Music Poland |
| CD | Japan | 24 August 2011 | Avalon Marquee |
| CD | North America | September 13, 2011 | Nuclear Blast |
| CD | Mexico | September 13, 2011 | Nuclear Blast/Scarecrow Records |
