= The Empire (album) =

Studio album by Vader
- Released: 4 November 2016
- Recorded: May–June 2016
- Genre: Thrash metal, death metal
- Length: 33:07
- Label: Nuclear Blast
- Producer: Wojtek and Sławek Wiesławscy

Vader chronology
Tibi et Igni (2014)	The Empire (2016)	Thy Messenger (2019)

Professional ratings
Review scores
Source	Rating
All About the Rock	9/10 stars
Blabbermouth.net	9/10 stars
Metal Injection	5/10 stars
Teamrock.com	3.5/5 stars

The Empire is the eleventh studio album by Polish death metal band Vader. The album was described in a review on Blabbermouth as "vintage Vader".

== Track listing ==
No.	Title	Length
1.	"Angels of Steel"	2:16
2.	"Tempest"	2:41
3.	"Prayer to the God of War"	2:47
4.	"Iron Reign"	4:37
5.	"No Gravity"	4:08
6.	"Genocidius"	2:59
7.	"The Army-Geddon"	4:10
8.	"Feel My Pain"	3:24
9.	"Parabellum"	2:28
10.	"Send Me Back to Hell"	3:32
Total length:		33:07

== Personnel ==
=== Vader ===
- Piotr "Peter" Wiwczarek – lead vocals, lead guitar
- Marek "Spider" Pająk – rhythm guitar
- Tomasz "Hal" Halicki – bass
- James Stewart – drums

=== Production ===
- Wojtek and Sławek Wiesławscy – production, mixing, mastering, recording
- Joe Petagno – cover art

== Charts ==
Chart (2016)	Peak position
Polish Albums (ZPAV)	29
US Heatseekers Albums (Billboard)	17
US Top Hard Rock Albums (Billboard)	21
