= Hotel Walls =

Single by Smith & Thell

from the album Pixie's Parasol
- Language: English
- Released: July 2019
- Genre: Indie folk • indie pop
- Length: 3:26
- Label: Playground Music Scandinavia
- Songwriters: Maria Jane Smith; Victor Thell; Joakim Berg; Alexander Tidebrink

Smith & Thell singles chronology
"Forgive Me Friend" (2018)	"Hotel Walls" (2019)	"Goliath" (2020)

"Hotel Walls" is a song recorded by Swedish group Smith & Thell, and released as a single in July 2019.

== Charts ==
=== Weekly charts ===
Chart (2019)	Peak position
Norway (VG-lista)	34
Poland Airplay (ZPAV)	9
Sweden (Sverigetopplistan)	21

=== Year-end charts ===
Chart (2019)	Position
Poland (ZPAV)	62
Chart (2020)	Position
Sweden (Sverigetopplistan)	94

== Certifications ==
Region	Certification	Certified units/sales
Norway (IFPI Norway)	3× Platinum	180,000^{‡}
Poland (ZPAV)	Gold	10,000^{‡}
Streaming
Sweden (GLF)	2× Platinum	16,000,000^{†}
^{‡} Sales+streaming figures based on certification alone.^{†} Streaming-only figures based on certification alone.
