= Hospodi =

Studio album by Patriarkh
- Released: July 12, 2019
- Genre: Black metal
- Length: 51:07
- Label: Metal Blade

Patriarkh chronology
Hospodi (2019)	Prorok Ilja (2025)

Singles from Hospodi
- 1. "Polunosznica" Released: May 15, 2019; 2. "Wieczernia" Released: June 6, 2019; 3. "Liturgiya" Released: June 26, 2019; 4. "Utrenia" Released: July 12, 2019

Professional ratings
Review scores
Source	Rating
Exclaim!	6/10
Kerrang!	4/5 stars
Metal.de	6/10

Hospodi is the debut studio album by the Polish black metal band Patriarkh. It was released on July 12, 2019 via Metal Blade Records. It was released under the name "Batushka", years before the band name changed to "Patriarkh". It was recorded and released under the leadership of Krysiuk with the members from the original Batushka, however, without the participation of Batushka's founding member Krzysztof Drabikowski.

Hospodi is a concept album based on the Orthodox Liturgy of Death. The title name "Hospodi" translates to "Lord" in Church Slavonic, emphasizing the religious overtones that permeate the album's atmosphere. Unlike their earlier work, which featured a rawer production style, Hospodi leans into a more polished and accessible sound while still maintaining the ritualistic and spiritual tone that Batushka was known for.

Musically, Hospodi blends traditional black metal elements—blast beats, tremolo guitar riffs, and harsh vocals—with Orthodox chanting, choral arrangements, and ambient interludes. Each track is named after a part of an Orthodox funeral rite, forming a liturgical progression that mirrors a symbolic journey through death and judgment.

The album's release was surrounded by controversy due to the split between founding guitarist Krzysztof Drabikowski and vocalist Krysiuk. Despite the legal and fanbase conflicts, Hospodi received both praise and criticism: some lauded its atmospheric depth and production quality, while others felt it lacked the raw intensity of the band's earlier debut, Litourgiya.

The band's film director, Hiatsyntos, directed a 30-minute music film for Hospodi called "Parastas", which featured 5 songs from the album. These were also released individually as music videos on the band's and Metal Blade's YouTube channels.

== Track listing ==
No.	Title	Length
1.	"Wozglas"	2:33
2.	"Dziewiatyj Czas"	6:08
3.	"Wieczernia"	5:31
4.	"Powieczerje"	5:29
5.	"Polunosznica"	5:23
6.	"Utrenia"	5:26
7.	"Pierwyj Czas"	4:37
8.	"Tretij Czas"	4:59
9.	"Szestoj Czas"	4:29
10.	"Liturgiya"	6:32
Total length:		46:07

== Charts ==
Chart (2019)	Peak position
Belgian Albums (Ultratop Flanders)	188
Polish Albums (ZPAV)	1

== Personnel ==
- Bartłomiej Krysiuk - lead vocals, producer
- Artur Rumiński - guitars & bass
- Paweł Jaroszewicz - drums

== See also ==
- List of number-one albums of 2019 (Poland)
