= Paweł Jaroszewicz =

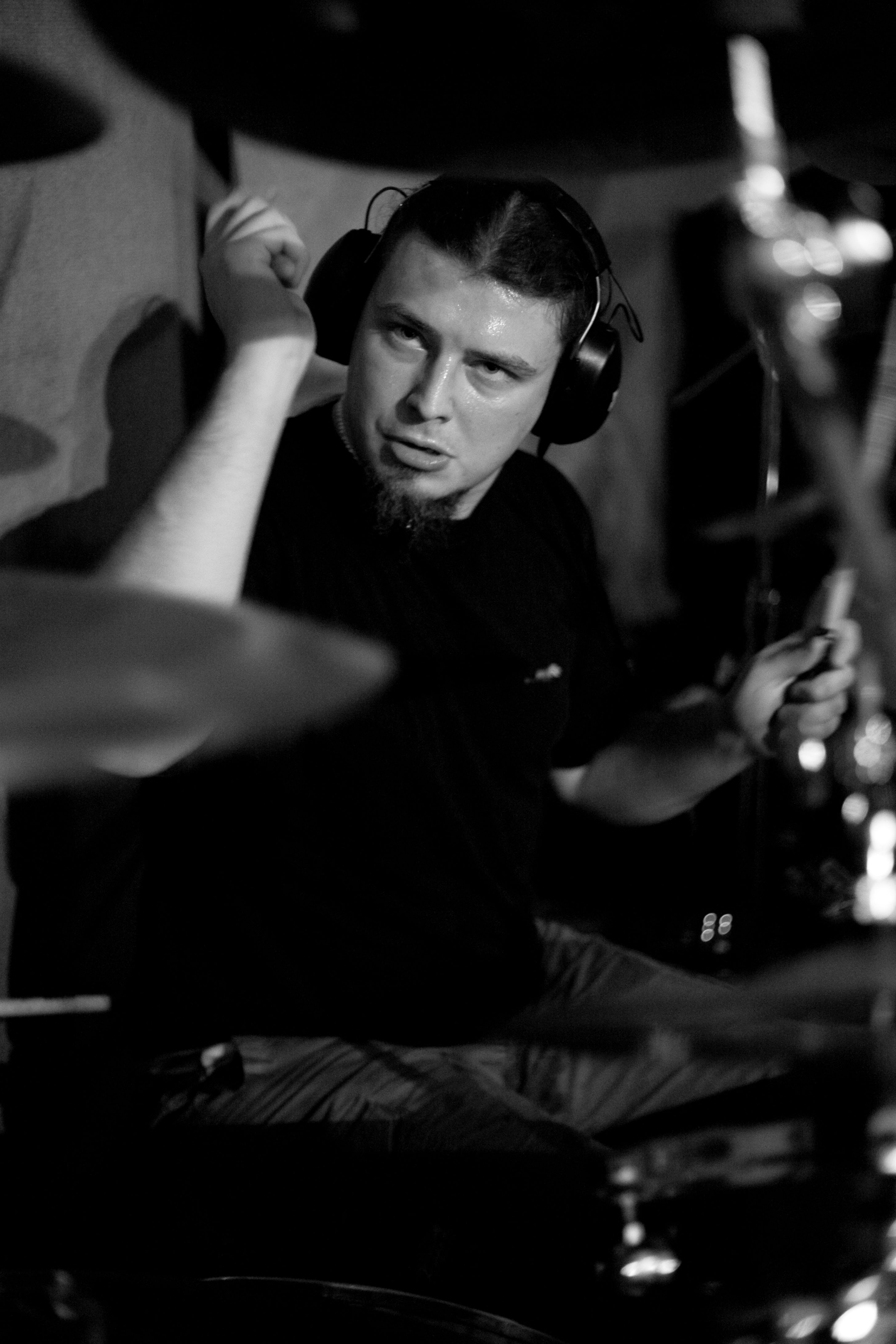
- Paweł Jaroszewicz, 2008

Background information
- Also known as: Paul, Virus, Pavulon
- Born: Paweł Jaroszewicz; 20 September 1985 (age 40)
- Origin: Świdnik, Poland
- Genres: Heavy metal, death metal, black metal
- Occupation: Musician
- Instrument: Drums
- Years active: 2002–present

Paweł Jaroszewicz (born 20 September 1985 in Świdnik), is a Polish heavy metal drummer. Jaroszewicz has played with such bands as Interior, Rootwater, Sinful, Vader, Hazael, Thy Disease, Crionics, Deivos, Nerve, Obscure Sphinx, Christ Agony, No Emotions, Hell-Born, Lost Soul, FS Projekt, Decapitated, and Hate. He now plays in Patriarkh, Soul Snatcher, and Antigama and is also the current live drummer for Nargaroth and VLTIMAS.

He is endorsed by Czarcie Kopyto Pedals, Meinl Cymbals, Tama Drums, custom made in ears from XAN Audio, Wincent Drum Sticks, Red Case Drum Cases, Footblaster Triggers, and Fat Cables. He used to be endorsed by Paiste, Vic Firth, and DrumCraft drums.

== Discography ==
- Soul Snatcher – Pylons of Dispersion (2007, Redrum666 Records)
- Hell-Born – Darkness (2008, Witching Hour Productions)
- Rootwater – Visionism (2009, Mystic Production)
- Vader – Necropolis (2009, Nuclear Blast)
- Sinful – XIII Апостол (2010, MSR Productions)
- Crionics – N.O.I.R. (2010, MSR Productions)
- Vader – Welcome to the Morbid Reich (2011, Nuclear Blast)
- Antigama – Stop the Chaos (EP, 2012, SelfMadeGod Records)
- Antigama – Meteor (2013, SelfMadeGod Records)
- Hate – Crusade:Zero (2015, Napalm Records)
- Hate – Tremendum (2017, Napalm Records)
- Hate – Auric Gates of Veles (2019, Metal Blade Records)
- Patriarkh - Hospodi (2019, Metal Blade Records)
- Patriarkh - "RASKOL" (2020, Witching Hour Productions)
- Patriarkh - Carju Niebiesnyj (2021, Witching Hour Productions)
- Patriarkh - MARIA (2022, Witching Hour Productions)
- SHADOHM - Through Darkness Towards Enlightenment (2024, Selfmadegod Records)
- Patriarkh - PROROK ILJA (2025, Napalm Records)
