= Patriarkh =

Polish black metal band

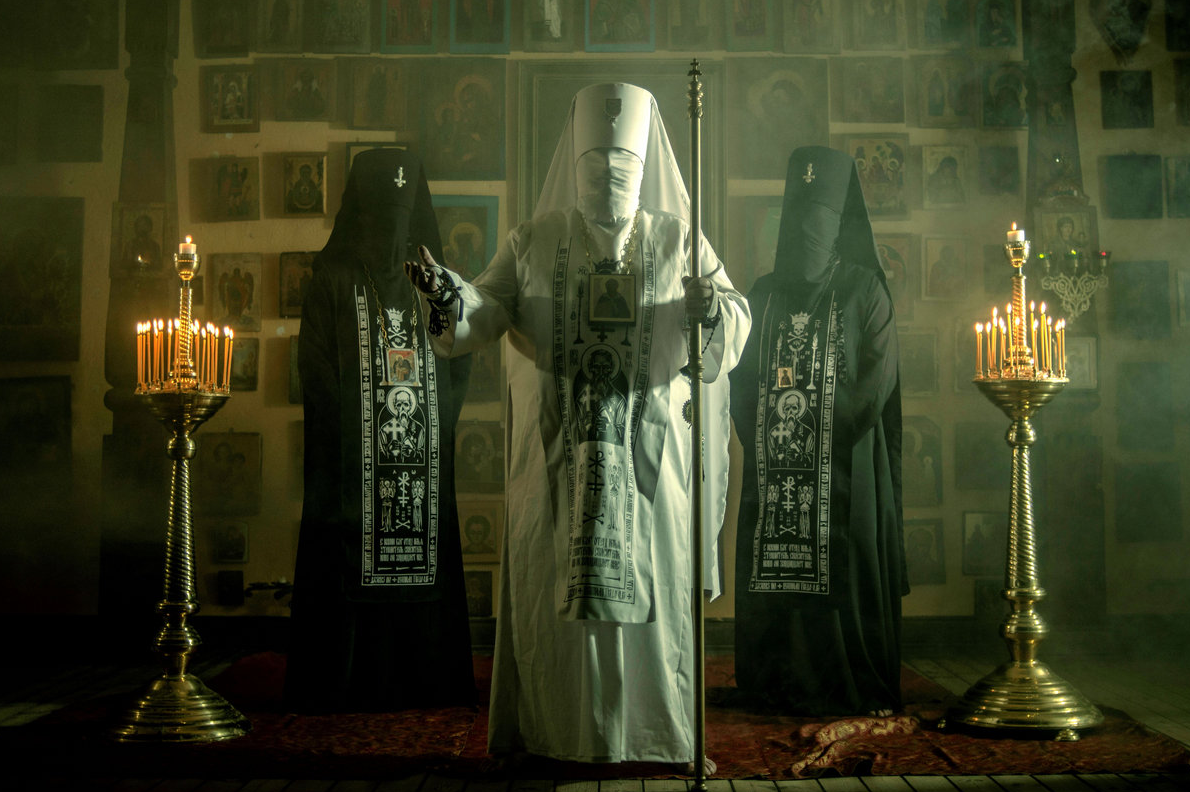
- "Sacrum Profanum"

Background information
- Also known as: Batushka (2019–2024)
- Origin: Białystok, Poland
- Genre: Black metal
- Years active: 2019–present
- Label: Napalm
- Spinoff of: Batushka
- Members: Bartłomiej Krysiuk; Paweł Jaroszewicz; Rafał Łyszczarz; Jakub Śliwowski; Jacek Wisniewsky; Michał Staczkun; Mateusz Krysiuk; Klaudia Łyszczarz
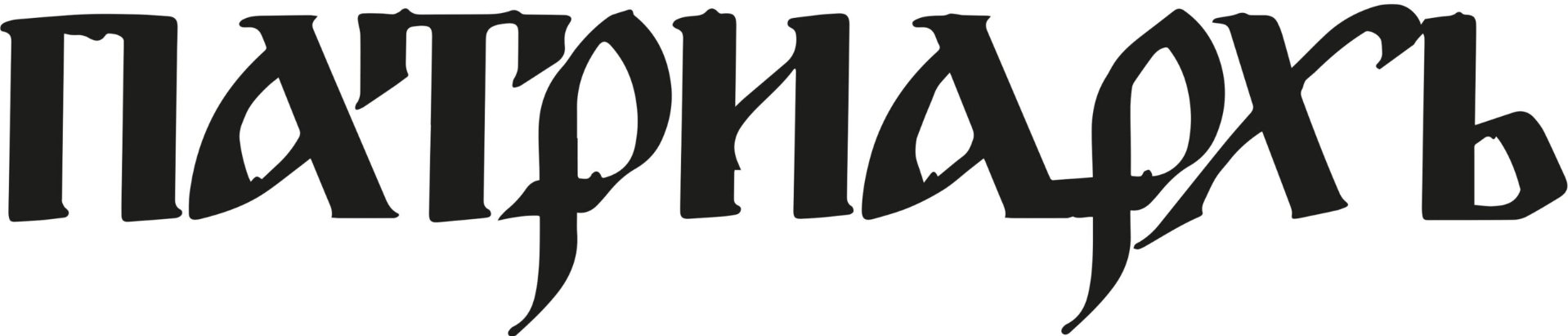

Patriarkh (stylised as PATRIARKH in English and ПАТРИАРХЪ in Cyrillic) is a Polish black metal band based in Białystok. The band has its origins in Batushka, from which it splintered after a conflict over the rights to the band name. Their music and lyrics are inspired by the Eastern Orthodox Church, traditional hymns, songs, history and conflicts of the church and regional folk-lore. The band members wear interpretations of Analavos of the Great Schema (see Eastern Orthodox schemas), Mitres, and Klobuks during live performances.

== History ==
Patriarkh was created after fractures within the band Batushka. Bart Krysiuk (Vocals) and Krzysztof Drabikowski (Guitar) engaged in a legal conflict over the rights to the 'Batushka' name. Krysiuk and the Batushka band members had separated from Drabikowski in 2018, but both parties continued to use the name.

In April 2019, Krysiuk shared a statement that he and his band had signed with Metal Blade Records and would release new music in July 2019.

On July 12th, 2019, Batushka released Hospodi. It was released at a difficult time for the band, as they suffered a public dispute which harmed their reputation, and caused pre-conceived opinions about the music. Despite these challenges, they continued with their bookings for the 2019 summer, performing several festivals and concerts across Europe.

Between 2020 and 2024, Batushka released two EP's ("RASKOL" and Carju Niebiesnyj), two live-albums (Black Liturgy and Black Rituals), and a compilation album called MARIA.

In this 4 year period, the band completed five European tours, three U.K. tours, three Polish tours, two extensive tours in North America (each spanning across Canada, United States, and Mexico), and two twice visited China, Japan, and Southeast Asia.

In November 2022, Napalm Records signed the band to their artist roster and would release new music "very soon". However, it would be another two years before new music would come, and Batushka would continue to tour.

=== Rename to Patriarkh ===
In May 2024, the Polish courts made their ruling, bringing a 5-year-long case to a close. The courts granted the Batushka name rights to Drabikowski. Krysiuk would appeal the decision, while continuing with his band's 2024 plans.

On September 9, 2024, Bartłomiej Krysiuk, through his band's social networks, announced officially that they will no longer use the name "Batushka" and they will rebrand as "Patriarkh" (stylized in Cyrillic as Патриархъ).

On September 20, 2024, the band held a special live-stream pay-per-view event of the concert in Krakow. The exclusive event was available to watch for an additional 48 hours after the concert. The name change was promoted over the next 3 months while the band toured Europe and Asia. The name change was made official on December 13, 2024, in Melbourne, Australia.

The first official release of new music under the Patriarkh name was delivered on October 15, 2024. The song "ВЕРШАЛИН III" (Lat. WIERSZALIN III) was released to streaming platforms, along with a premiere of a music video directed by the band's long-time film collaborator "Hiatsyntos". Along with the digital release, a special limited edition 12" EP was sold on the band's 'Epic Prophecy for Europe' tour, and remaining copies would later be sold through the bands webstore. Three color variants were available from the band: black, white, and gold. Napalm Records had a red variant available exclusively through their store. In total, 500 copies were made, and the b-side featured a special engraving.

=== Prorok Ilja ===
The band's second major label full-length studio album, Prorok Ilja, was released on January 3, 2025 via Napalm Records. Prorok Ilja was recorded at several studios across Poland between January and May 2024.

Prorok Ilja details a true story that happened in the village of Stara Grzybowszczyzna, in the Podlachia region of Poland in the 1930s and 1940s. Eliasz Klimowicz was a self-proclaimed prophet who cultivated a following and created a religious sect within the orthodox faith of the region.

On January 3, 2025, Patriarkh held the premiere concert of Prorok Ilja, called "Sinfonia Orthodoxia", in Łódź at the Klub Wytwórnia. This was the inaugural concert of the band under the Patriarkh name, and featured a male choir (Singing Heads Choir) and a symphony orchestra (Squad Kulturalny Orchestra).

== Band members ==
Current members

- Варфоломей – Singing & Screaming (2015-present)
- Лех – Drums (2018-present)
- Хиацынтос Яца – Singing (2018-present)
- Монах Тарлахан – Guitar (2018-present)
- Монах Борута – Guitar (2020-present)
- Архангел Михаил – Guitar (2023-present)
- Матеуш – Singing (2023-present)
- Матюшка – Singing (2024-present)

Former members

- Блажей - Singing (2016-2023)
- Дедушка - Bass (2018-2021)
- Доминос - *Live Guitar (2018-2019); *Live Bass (2021-2023)
- Язычник - Singing (2019-2023)
- Мартин - Guitar (2019-2020)
- ВФП - *Live 3rd Guitar (2024-2025); *Live Bass (2025)

== Discography ==
Studio albums

- Hospodi (Metal Blade Records, Mystic Production, 2019)
- Пророк Илия / Prophet Ilja (Napalm Records, 2025)

Extended plays

- Раскол / "Raskol" (Witching Hour Productions, 2020)
- Царю небесный / Carju Niebiesnyj (Witching Hour Productions, 2021)

Live albums

- Черная литургия / Black Liturgy (Bad Music, Witching Hour Productions, 2020)
- Черные ритуалы / Black Rituals (Liturgy in Budapest – Live 2021) (Bad Music, Via Nocturna, 2024)
- Черная пасха (Пасха в Кракове 2024) / Black Pascha (Live in Krakow 2024) (Via Nocturna, 2025)
- Hospodi IX.XI.MMXIX Live (Via Nocturna, 2025)

Compilations

- Мария / Maria (Witching Hour Productions, Via Nocturna, 2022)

Singles

- Polunosznica (Metal Blade Records, 2019)
- Wieczernia (Metal Blade Records, 2019)
- Liturgiya (Metal Blade Records, 2019)
- Irmos II (Bad Music, 2020)
- Irmos III (Bad Music, 2020)
- Irmos IV (Bad Music, 2020)
- Pismo IV (Bad Music, 2021)
- Pismo I (Bad Music, 2021)
- Мария (Witching Hour Productions, 2023)
- Wierszalin III (Napalm Records, Via Nocturna, 2024)
- Wierszalin IV (Napalm Records, 2024)
- Wierszalin II (Napalm Records, 2024)
- Wierszalin VII (Napalm Records, 2024)
