= Tomasz Halicki =

Polish musician

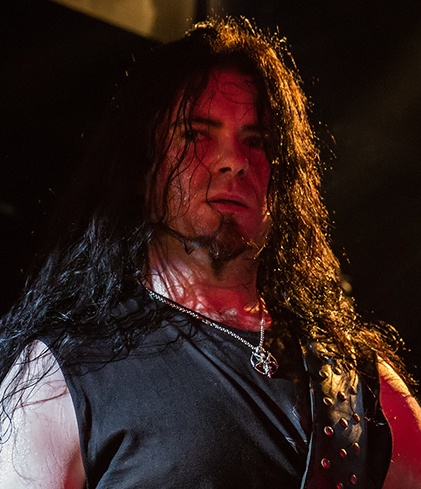
- Tomasz Halicki, 2013

Background information
- Also known as: Hal
- Born: 18 December 1976 (age 49)
- Genres: Death metal, black metal
- Occupation: Musician
- Instruments: Guitar, bass guitar

Tomasz Halicki (born 18 December 1976) is a Polish musician. He has played with such bands as Stygmat, Via Mistica, Diseased and Dead Infection. He currently plays in Abused Majesty, Hermh, Evil Machine and Vader.

Hal is endorsed by Warwick Bass Guitars & Amps

== Discography ==
Vader

- XXV (2008, Regain Records, guest)
- Go to Hell (EP, 2014, Nuclear Blast)
- Tibi et Igni (2014, Nuclear Blast)
- Future of the Past II – Hell in the East (2015, Witching Hour Productions)
- Before the Age of Chaos – Live 2015 (Live album, 2015, Witching Hour Productions)
- Iron Times (EP, 2016, Nuclear Blast)
- The Empire (2016, Nuclear Blast)

Abused Majesty

- Serpenthrone (2004, Empire Records, Adipocere Records)
- ...So Man Created God in His Own Image (2008, Empire Records 2009, Witching Hour Production)

Hermh

- Before the Eden – Awaiting the Fire (2004, Pagan Records)
- Eden's Fire (2006, Pagan Records, Empire Records)
- After the Fire – Ashes (2008, Witching Hour Productions, Pagan Records)
- The SpiritUal Nation Born (2008, Witching Hour Productions, Pagan Records)
- Cold Blood Messiah (2008, Mystic Production, Regain Records, Witching Hour Productions)

Other

- Asgaard – Stairs to Nowhere (2012, Icaros Records, guest appearance)
- Dead Infection – Corpses of the Universe (2008, Obliteration Records, Haunted Hotel Records, Selfmadegod Records)
- Dead Infection – Heartburn Result (2009, split with Regurgitate, No Posers Please Records)
- Dead Infection – Furniture Obsession (2009, split with Haemorrhage, Fat Ass Records)
- Effect Murder – Architects of Sense (2009, White Worms Records, guest appearance)
- Evil Machine – War in Heaven (2013, Arachnophobia Records)
- Via Mistica – Testamentum (In Hora Mortis Nostre) (2003, Metal Mind Productions)
- Via Mistica – Fallen Angels (2004, Metal Mind Productions, cover art)
- Zørormr – Corpus Hermeticum (2015, Via Nocturna Records, guest appearance)
- Cinis – The Last Days of Ouroboros (2008, Old Temple Records, cover art only)

== Equipment ==
guitars

- Warwick RB Vampyre 4
- Warwick GPS Thumb Bolt-On 4
- Warwick Vampyre NT 5 custom #16-3083

amps

- Warwick LWA 1000 BLACK
- Warwick LWA 500 BLACK
- Warwick Bass Combo BC 150
- Warwick Bass Cabinets 408 LW CE

effects & others

- Darkglass B7K Ultra
- Darkglass Super Symmetry
- Aquilar Agro
- TC Electronic Sentry Noise Gate
