= Forgive Me Friend =

Single by Smith & Thell and Swedish Jam Factory

from the album Pixie's Parasol
- Language: English
- Released: 10 August 2018
- Recorded: 2018
- Genre: Indie folk • folktronica • indie pop
- Length: 3:38
- Composer: Victor Thell
- Lyricists: Maria Jane Smith, Victor Thell
- Producer: Victor Thell

Smith & Thell singles chronology
"Forgive Me Friend" (2018)	"Hotel Walls" (2019)

"Forgive Me Friend" is a song recorded by Swedish group Smith & Thell and Swedish Jam Factory, and released as a single on 10 August 2018.

== In popular culture ==
In 2021, the song went viral on TikTok, appearing in more than 9,620 videos as of April 18, 2021.

== Charts ==
=== Weekly charts ===
Chart (2018–2019)	Peak position
Poland Airplay (ZPAV)	1
Sweden (Sverigetopplistan)	7
US Hot Rock & Alternative Songs (Billboard)	22

=== Year-end charts ===
Chart (2019)	Position
Poland (ZPAV)	8
Sweden (Sverigetopplistan)	39
US Hot Rock Songs (Billboard)	78

== Certifications ==
Region	Certification	Certified units/sales
Norway (IFPI Norway)	Platinum	60,000^{‡}
Poland (ZPAV)	Platinum	20,000^{‡}
Streaming
Sweden (GLF)	4× Platinum	32,000,000^{†}
^{‡} Sales+streaming figures based on certification alone.^{†} Streaming-only figures based on certification alone.

== See also ==
- List of number-one singles of 2019 (Poland)
