= Inbornmedia =

Polish television production company

Inbornmedia is a Polish TV production company based in Warsaw launched in 2005, which produces more than 100 hours of TV content per year for local broadcasters such as Polsat, TVN, TVP, and international players such as Discovery Networks, BBC, Viasat World, etc. Amongst others, the company created 13 seasons of Złomowisko PL (Eng. Scrappers) – the most successful TV series in the history of Discovery Channel Polska. It has also created the first series for BBC, produced in Poland for the Polish audience, Spakowane Życie (Eng. Packed Up Life).

== History ==
Inbornmedia has recently established an international arm to focus on global production. The result is the signing of a distribution agreement with Off the Fence for the film The Gorals. Highlanders of Carpatnia and 5G. The speed of wave sold to France 5, Rai, Red Bull TV, Sky Germany, Al Jazeera, and Netflix, amongst others. Another significant production intended for the international market is the TV series Auschwitz in 33 objects on tragic events behind WWII, which was also included in the Off the Fence catalog.

In 2022, Inbornmedia, together with the British producer Woodcut International, produced a 4-episode series about the Polish Underground State entitled Underground Army for the Viasat World's History channel. Subsequently, the company completed the production of other titles, such as the film Chopin. I am not afraid of the darkness, which was awarded at the 59th Golden Prague International Festival, and received a distinction for the best documentary film at the Seattle Polish Film Festival.
