= Smith & Thell =

Swedish pop/folk duo

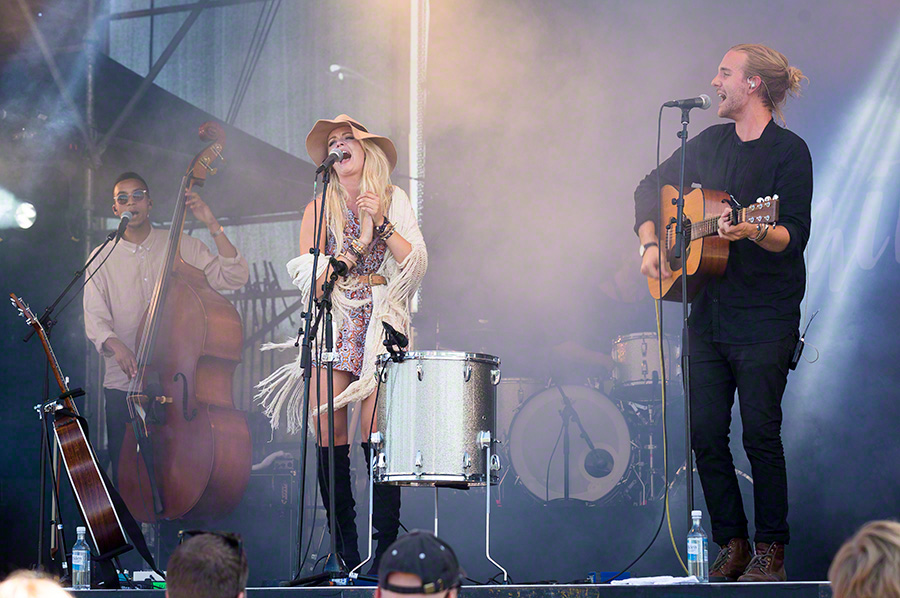
- Smith & Thell on stage during Stavernfestivalen in 2016

Background information
- Origin: Helsingborg, Sweden
- Genres: Pop; folk
- Years active: 2012–2024
- Label: Playground Music
- Members: Maria Jane Smith; Victor Thell

Smith & Thell was a pop/folk band based in Stockholm, Sweden. The duo, composed of Maria Jane Smith (vocals, guitar) and Victor Thell (vocals, guitar, production), first met one another as young teenagers at a local music event in their hometown of Helsingborg in Southern Sweden.

Their debut album Soulprints was released in April 2017 via the Nordic indie label Playground Music.

The follow-up international hit single, "Forgive Me Friend", came in November 2018, and led the band to signing its first major label deal with the storied American label, Arista Records, a subsidiary of Sony Music Entertainment. Smith & Thell's sophomore album, "Pixie's Parasol" came via Arista Recordings in 2021, and featured the hits "Forgive Me Friend", "Hotel Walls", "Year of the Young", and "Goliath". The duo went on to perform on stages across the world with other artists, including The Head and the Heart, Young the Giant, and Fitz and The Tantrums.

Smith & Thell won the Internationalen Songwriting-Wettbewerbs (ISC) with their song "Goliath" in 2021.

== History ==
In 2015, they released the song "Statue", which was performed on the SVT Moraeus in the same year. Also in 2015, the duo won the Denniz Pop Awards with Max Martin in the jury. In spring of 2016, they won Musexpo in Los Angeles in the category "New Emerging International Artist". The same year, influencer and music critic Bob Lefsetz placed "Statue" at number 16 on his list of the best songs of 2016 with the description, "An instant classic, you'll get this one immediately." The duo followed up "Statue" with the singles "Row" (2016), "February" (2017), and "Toast" (2017), before releasing their debut album Soulprints on May 12, 2017.

The band's first major breakthrough came in November 2018, with their hit single "Forgive Me Friend". The song has since been streamed over 85 million times and earned Platinum (3x) status in Sweden and Gold status in Norway. The hit reached #1 on Pop Radio in Sweden and Poland, Top 25 on U.S. Alternative Radio, and Top 10 on U.S. Triple A Radio. Smith & Thell’s follow-up 2019 single, "Hotel Walls", quickly shot to #1 on Swedish Pop Radio and has been streamed over 50 million times. It is certified Platinum in Sweden and Gold in Norway. In 2020, Smith & Thell won a Swedish Grammis for Composers of the Year, and in 2021, they won a Rockbjörnen for Best Group 2021.

In August 2024, the duo decided to take a break and pursue a solo career.

== Musical style ==
Smith has stated, "We don't work towards making albums with one specific sound; it's song-by-song written on the way while we live...these last years have been a rollercoaster of emotions: we lost a loved family member way too young, we went from being a couple to continuing the band as friends, our career took off for real, we toured the world...to just name a few things. So the album was written on the way while all these things happened."

“We can't seem to get away from the sharp emotional turns in our music... [we] travel from the lowest pitch black bottom to the euphoric highs."

== Discography ==
=== Albums ===
==== Studio albums ====
List of studio albums, with selected chart positions
Title	Details	Peak chart positions
Title	Details	SWE
Soulprints	Released: 12 May 2017; Label: Playground Music; Formats: CD, digital download, streaming	—
Pixie's Parasol	Released: 5 February 2021; Label: Playground Music, Sony Music, Arista; Formats: CD, digital download, streaming	3
"—" denotes a recording that did not chart or was not released in that territory.

==== Live albums ====
- Acoustic in Isby (2021)

=== EPs ===
- Statue (2016)
- Telephone Wires (2018)
- A Chosen Family (2024)

=== Singles ===
==== As lead artist ====
List of singles as lead artist, with selected chart positions and certifications, showing year released and album name
Title	Year	Peak chart positions			Certifications	Album
Title	Year	SWE	POL	US Alt.	Certifications	Album
"Kill It with Love"	2012	—	—	—		Non-album singles
"Super DJ"	2013	—	—	—		Non-album singles
"Here Comes the Sun"	2013	—	—	—		Non-album singles
"Illusion"	2014	—	—	—		Non-album singles
"Hippie Van"	2014	—	—	—		Non-album singles
"Joshua's Song"	2015	—	—	—		Non-album singles
"Statue (The Pills Song)"	2015	—	—	—	GLF: Gold	Soulprints
"Row"	2016	—	—	—		Soulprints
"February"	2017	—	—	—		Soulprints
"Toast"	2017	—	—	—	GLF: Platinum	Soulprints
"Somebody Like You"	2017	—	—	—		Soulprints
"Dumb"	2018	—	—	—		Non-album singles
"Girl from the Sea"	2018	—	—	—		Non-album singles
"Forgive Me Friend" (featuring Swedish Jam Factory)	2018	7	1	26	GLF: 4× Platinum; ZPAV: Platinum	Pixie's Parasol
"Hotel Walls"	2019	21	9	—	GLF: 2× Platinum; ZPAV: Gold	Pixie's Parasol
"Yatzy"	2020	—	—	—		Pixie's Parasol
"Goliath"	2020	37	12	—	GLF: 2× Platinum	Pixie's Parasol
"Year of the Young"	2020	58	10	—	GLF: Platinum	Pixie's Parasol
"Radioactive Rain"	2021	—	—	—		Pixie's Parasol
"Nangilima"	2021	52	—	—	GLF: Platinum	Pixie's Parasol
"Pixie's Parasol"	2021	— (Note: "Pixie's Parasol" did not enter the Swedish Singellista Chart, but peaked at number 12 on the Swedish Heatseeker Chart.)	—	—		Non-album singles
"Planet Mars"	2022	—	—	—		Non-album singles
"I Wanna Dance with Somebody (Who Loves Me)"	2022	—	—	—		Non-album singles
"I Feel It in the Wind"	2022	— (Note: "I Feel It in the Wind" did not enter the Swedish Singellista Chart, but peaked at number four on the Swedish Heatseeker Chart.)	—	—		Non-album singles
"We Were in Love"	2023	—	—	—		Non-album singles
"Waste of Time"	2024	—	—	—		A Chosen Family
"Little Altar Boy"	2024	—	—	—		A Chosen Family
"UFO"	2024	—	—	—		A Chosen Family
"At Least I Tried" (with Wrabel)	2024	—	—	—		A Chosen Family
"—" denotes a single that did not chart or was not released in that territory.

==== As featured artist ====
List of singles as featured artist, showing year released and album name
Title	Year	Album
"Me and You" (Moist featuring Smith & Thell)	2012	Temporary Arrangements

== Awards ==
- 2015 Denniz Pop Awards - "Rookie Artist of the Year"
- 2016 Musexpo in Los Angeles - "New Emerging International Artist"
- 2020 Swedish Grammis - Composers of the Year
- 2021 Swedish Rockbjörnen - "Best Group 2021"
