= Vader (band) =

Polish death metal band

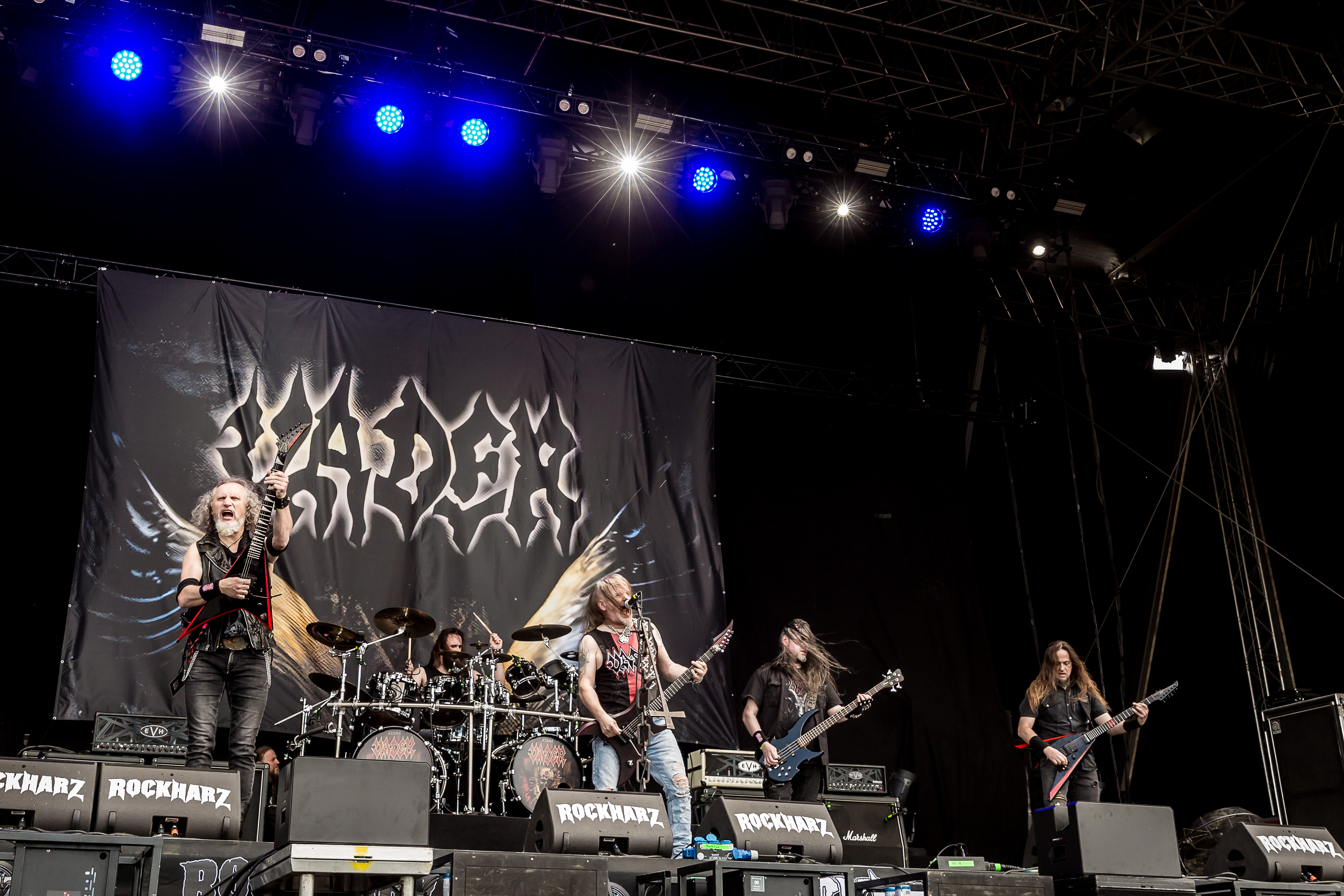
- Vader playing at Rockharz 2025

Background information
- Origin: Olsztyn, Poland
- Genres: Death metal; thrash metal
- Years active: 1983–present
- Labels: Mystic; Metal Mind; Earache; Impact; Hammerheart; Metal Blade; Regain; Nuclear Blast
- Members: Piotr Wiwczarek; Marek Pająk; Tomasz Halicki; Michał Andrzejczyk; Maurycy Stefanowicz
- Past members: See List of Vader band members
- Website: www.vader-store.com

Vader is a Polish death metal band from Olsztyn. Formed in 1983, the group was founded by then-bassist Piotr "Peter" Wiwczarek and guitarist Zbigniew "Vika" Wróblewski. Vader went through several lineup changes over the years, with Wiwczarek as the only constant member. Since 2022, the band has comprised Wiwczarek on lead vocals and lead guitar, rhythm guitarist Marek "Spider" Pająk, bassist Tomasz "Hal" Halicki, and drummer Michał Andrzejczyk.

Starting as a more traditional heavy metal group, Vader eventually went to thrash, speed, and then in the late 1980s became a death metal band. It would not be until nine years after forming that they managed to release their debut album The Ultimate Incantation (1992); Vader has released eleven more studio albums since then. The band's name was inspired by Darth Vader from the Star Wars film series. Lyrical themes include stories by H. P. Lovecraft, World War II, horror, and science fiction. According to Billboard magazine, by 2002 Vader sold approximately 500,000 releases around the world.

Vader will be working in the studio in the fall of 2025 to record their new (thirteenth) album.

== History ==
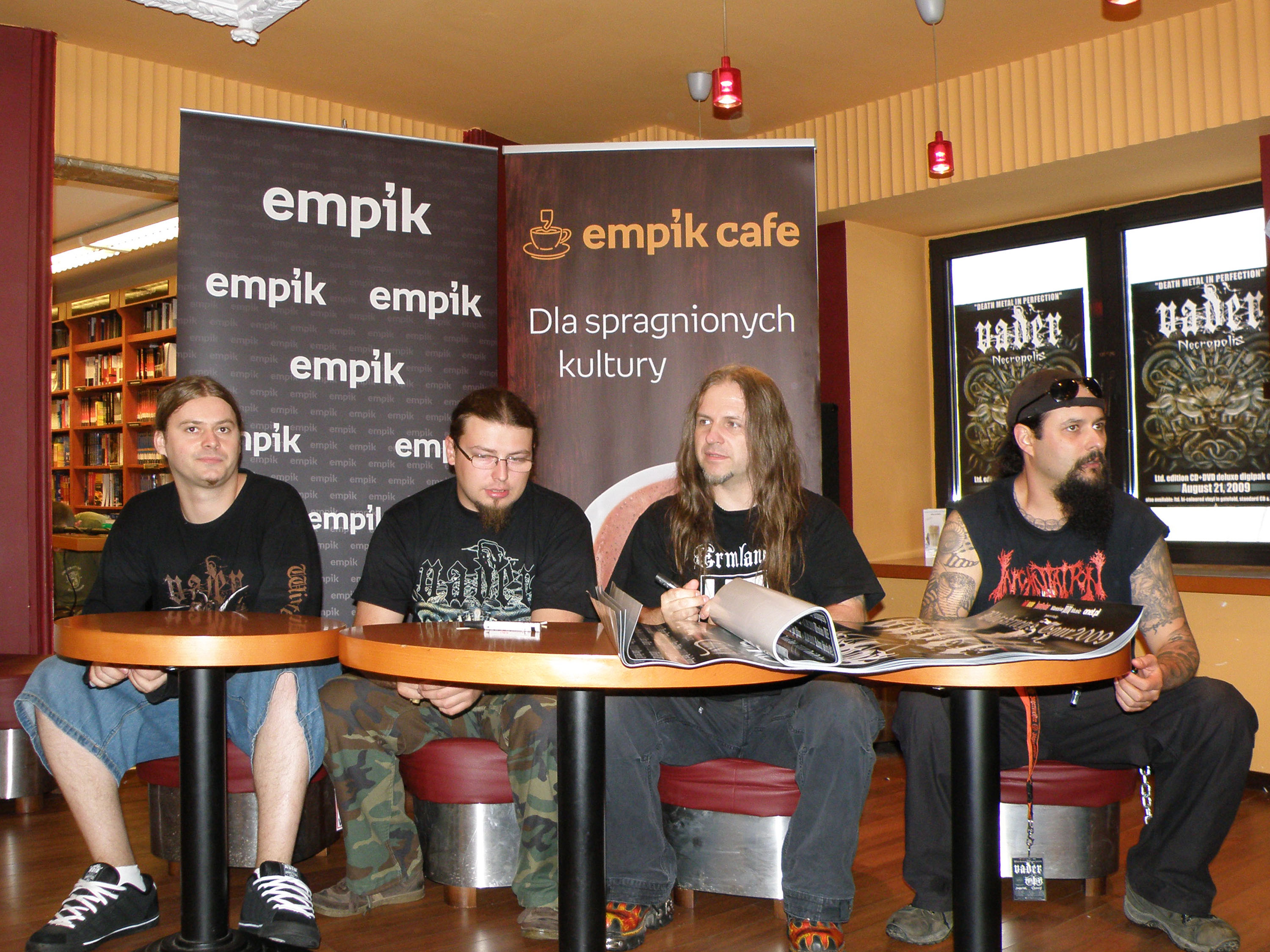
From left: Wacław "Vogg" Kiełtyka, Paweł "Paul" Jaroszewicz, Piotr "Peter" Wiwczarek and Tomasz "Reyash" Rejek, 28 August 2009

Vader was formed in 1983, the same year as the very first death metal pioneers Possessed and Death. However, at this time Vader was a heavy/speed metal band, later evolving into thrash metal and then finally death metal for the band's first demo, Live in Decay, in 1986. Vader released another demo, Necrolust, in 1989, but it was not until the band's third demo, Morbid Reich, in 1990, that Vader gained international attention. Morbid Reich sold nearly 10,000 copies, making it one of the most sold metal demos ever. This success earned the group a contract with Earache Records. The songs from Morbid Reich would appear later on Vader's full-length debut album in 1992, The Ultimate Incantation.

Due to communication breakdowns, the contract with Earache was terminated and the release of Sothis and The Darkest Age: Live '93, both in 1994, had to be released on different labels. In the meantime, Vader toured relentlessly, and in 1995, the band signed a contract with Impact Records. Vader then released De Profundis, Future of the Past, and Black to the Blind. Then, Hammerheart Records re-released two early demos, Necrolust and Morbid Reich, as the compilation Reborn in Chaos. In August 1998, Vader released Live in Japan. Vader also recorded the Kingdom EP and a VHS video entitled Vision and Voice around this time; both were released in December. In October 1998, Vader opened for Slayer during a show in Poland. At the end of 1998, Vader signed a contract to Metal Blade Records.

Vader spent most of 1999 touring. In March, Vader embarked on their first headlining US tour, the International Extreme Music Festival 1999, and in May Vader played at Metalmania. In June, the band went on another European tour, and the rest of the summer was filled with numerous appearances at festivals in Central Europe. Vader concluded touring by embarking on a European tour with thrash metal band Testament.

In November and December 1999, Vader recorded the album Litany, which was released in March 2000, and recorded a music video for the song "Cold Demons," which appeared on a special-edition digipack. The release of the album was also supported by live shows, including April's No Mercy Festival 2000, and in June, the band embarked on a 30-date European tour with Vital Remains, Fleshcrawl, and Pandemia.

In April 2001, Vader released the EP Reign Forever World, featuring re-recorded songs, cover songs, and live tracks. The band promoted the album intensively, touring Poland, Russia and Ukraine, and again in the US. In September 2001, they did another European tour with Cryptopsy, Dying Fetus, Catastrophic, and several other bands. This was followed by ten Polish appearances as part of the Thrash'em All Festival 2001, along with Krisiun, Behemoth and several Polish death metal and black metal bands.

In 2002, Vader released Revelations, and toured England, Scotland, and Ireland during the No Mercy Festival's dates. In May, the band released its first DVD, More Vision and the Voice. In 2004, the band started recording The Beast. Recording sessions for the album were postponed in May due to an accident which injured the drummer, Doc. He was replaced with Daray from the Polish band Vesania. Recording was finished in mid-July, and to support the album, the band toured again, appearing at over 170 concerts. The Europe-wide tour saw Vader's first trip to the Balkans. The most important gig of 2004 was at the Silesian Stadium in Chorzów, where the band opened for Metallica in front of 50,000 people.

In March 2005, long-time drummer, Doc, left the band due to struggling with alcoholism. Five months later, he died unexpectedly from heart failure. He was 34 years old.

In 2008, Novy decided to leave Vader after five years; Marcin Rygiel (ex-Decapitated) replaced him on bass for the U.S. Summer Slaughter Tour 2008. Reyash would join as a permanent bassist later in the year.

In 2009, Vader's eighth album, Necropolis, was released via Nuclear Blast Records. The album was recorded at Hertz studios in Bialystok, Poland with the Wieslawski Bros. In 2011, Vader released another album, entitled Welcome to the Morbid Reich.

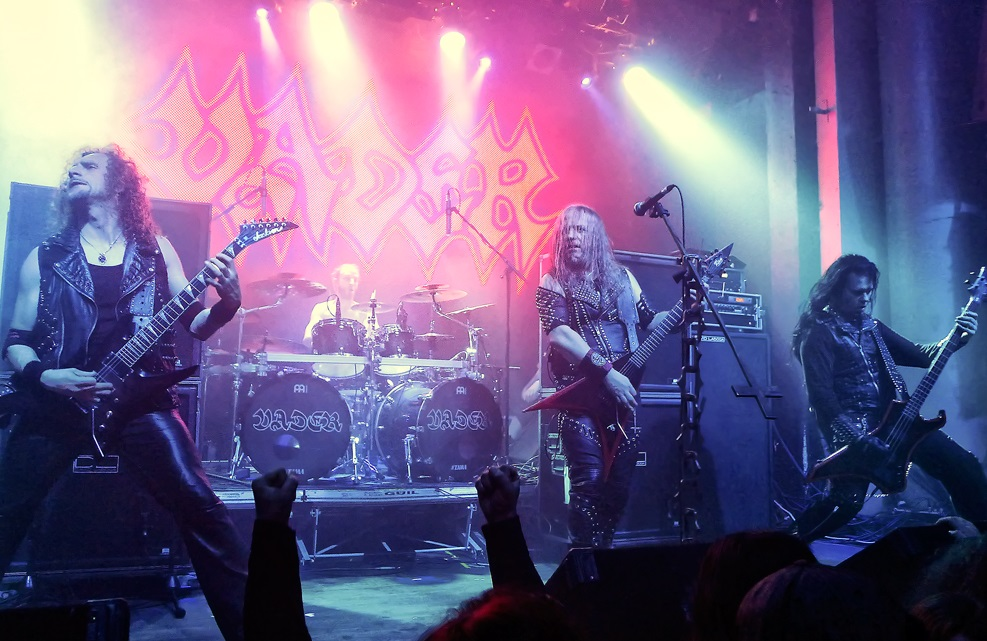
Vader performing in 2015

In December 2013, Vader entered the studio to record their then-upcoming tenth album, titled Tibi et Igni, for an early 2014 release. On 7 March 2014, the band finished recording the album, which was released on 30 May by Nuclear Blast. Their next album, The Empire, was released on 4 November 2016. The band toured for nearly two years in support of The Empire, including headlining a US tour (with support from Internal Bleeding, Sacrificial Slaughter, Voices of Ruin and Micawber) in May and June 2017, and supporting Testament and Annihilator on the European Brotherhood of the Snake tour in March and April 2018.

The band released an extended play titled Thy Messenger on 31 May 2019 through Nuclear Blast. Their newest full-length album, Solitude in Madness, was released on 1 May 2020. As of January 2022, according to Piotr "Peter" Wiwczarek, Vader has begun recording new music for their next album. In March 2022, it was announced drummer James Stewart had departed the band a month prior and was replaced by Michał Andrzejczyk.

2023 line-up

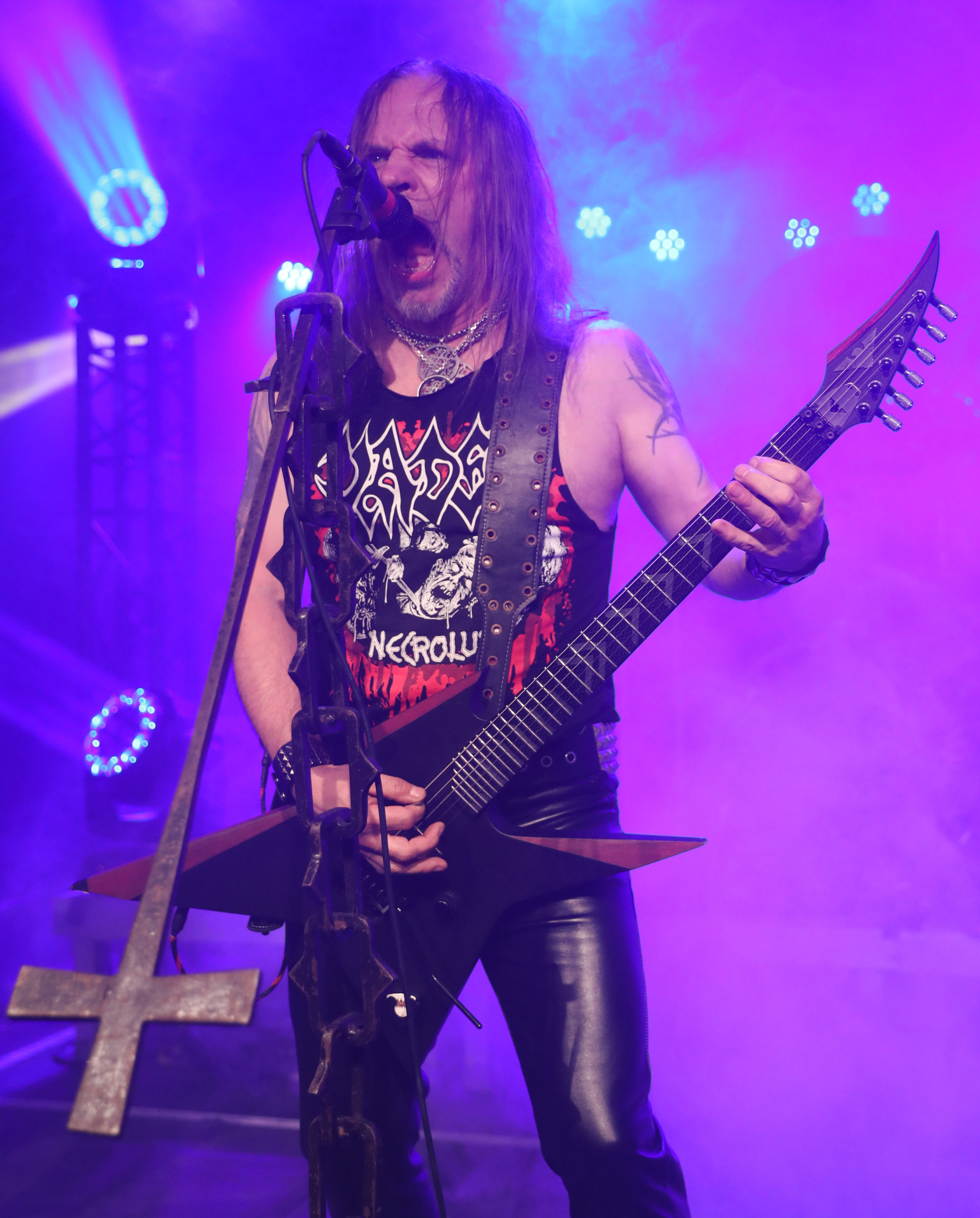
Piotr Wiwczarek in ORWOhaus

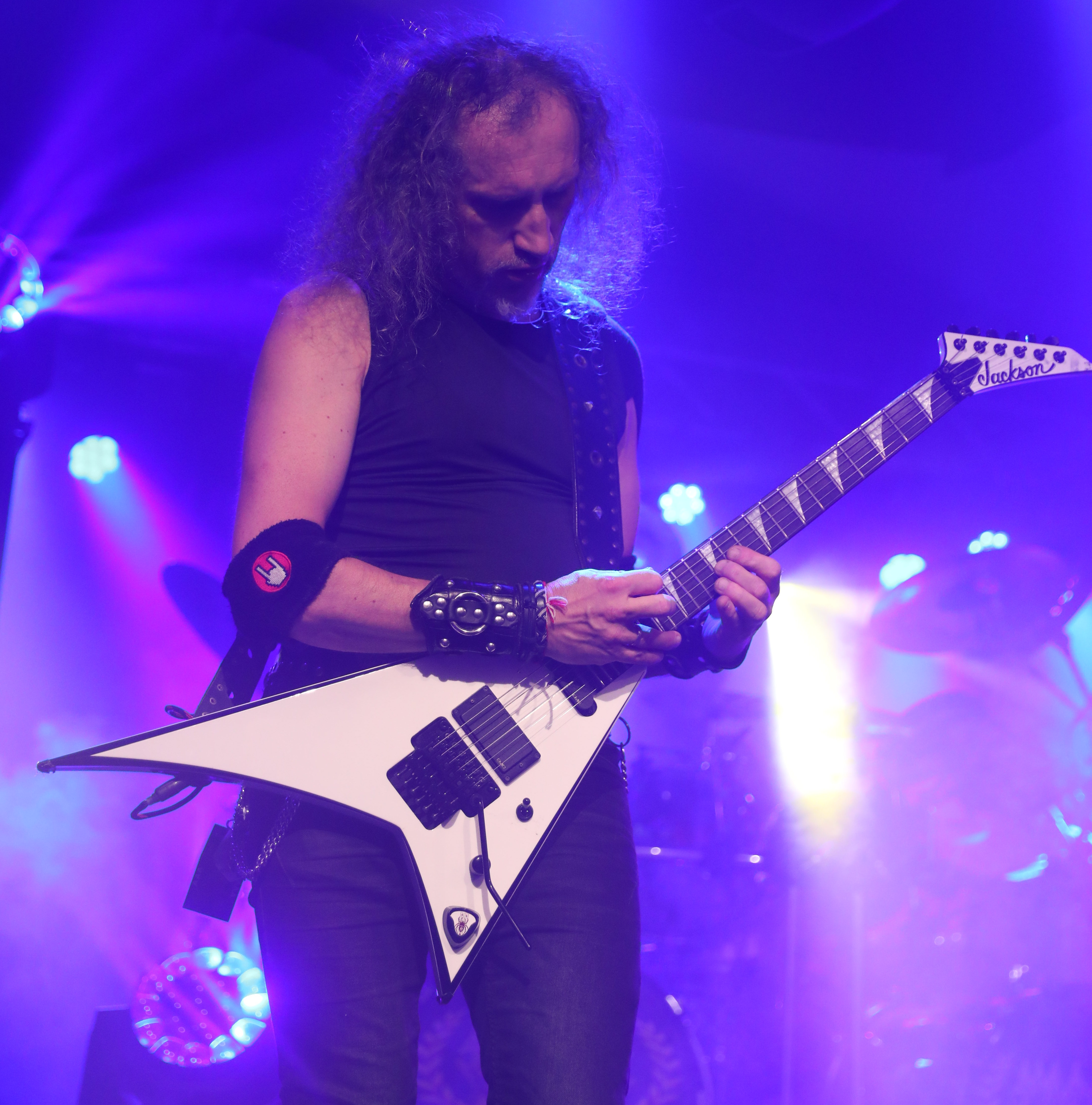
Marek Pająk

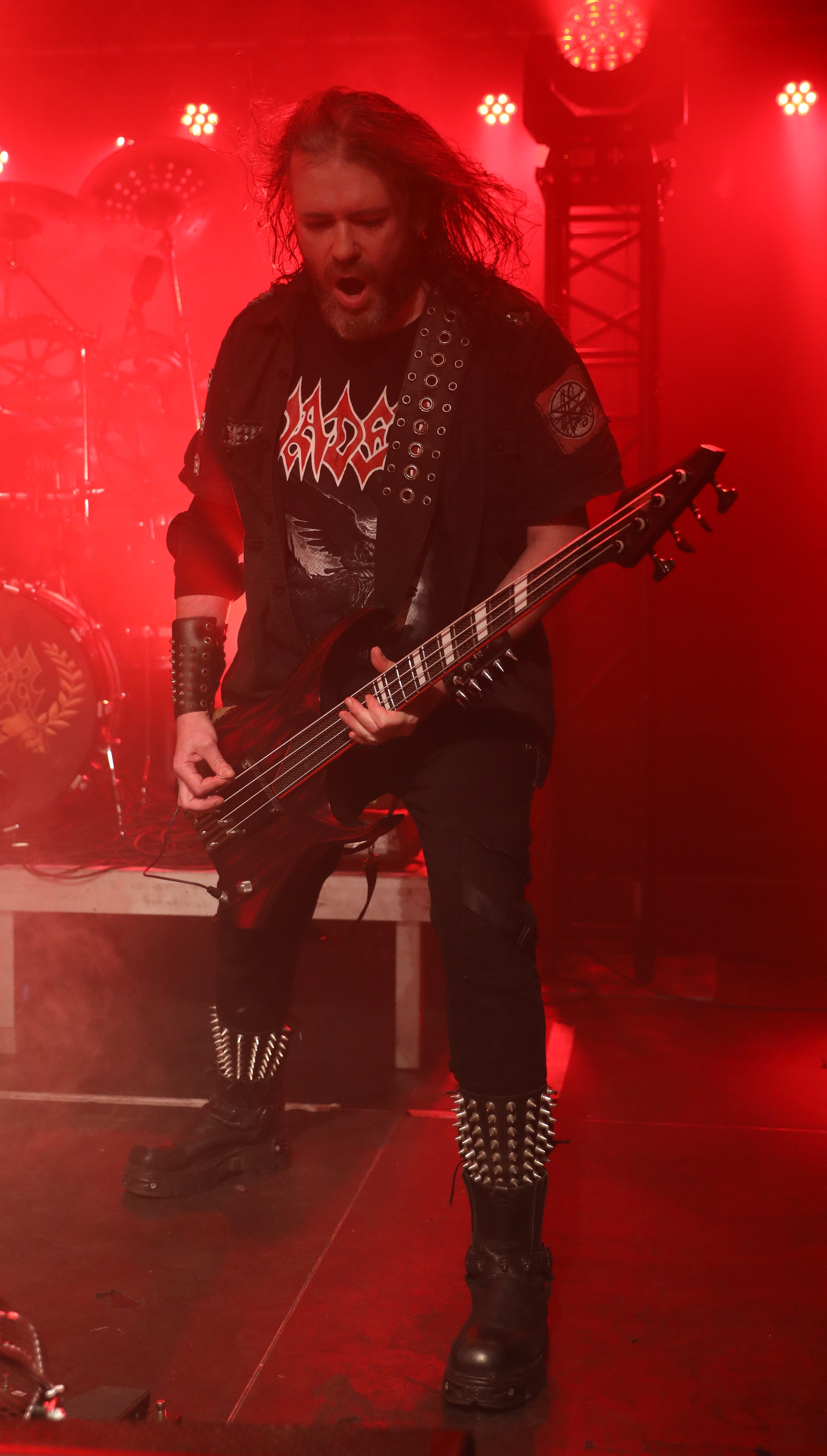
Tomasz Halicki

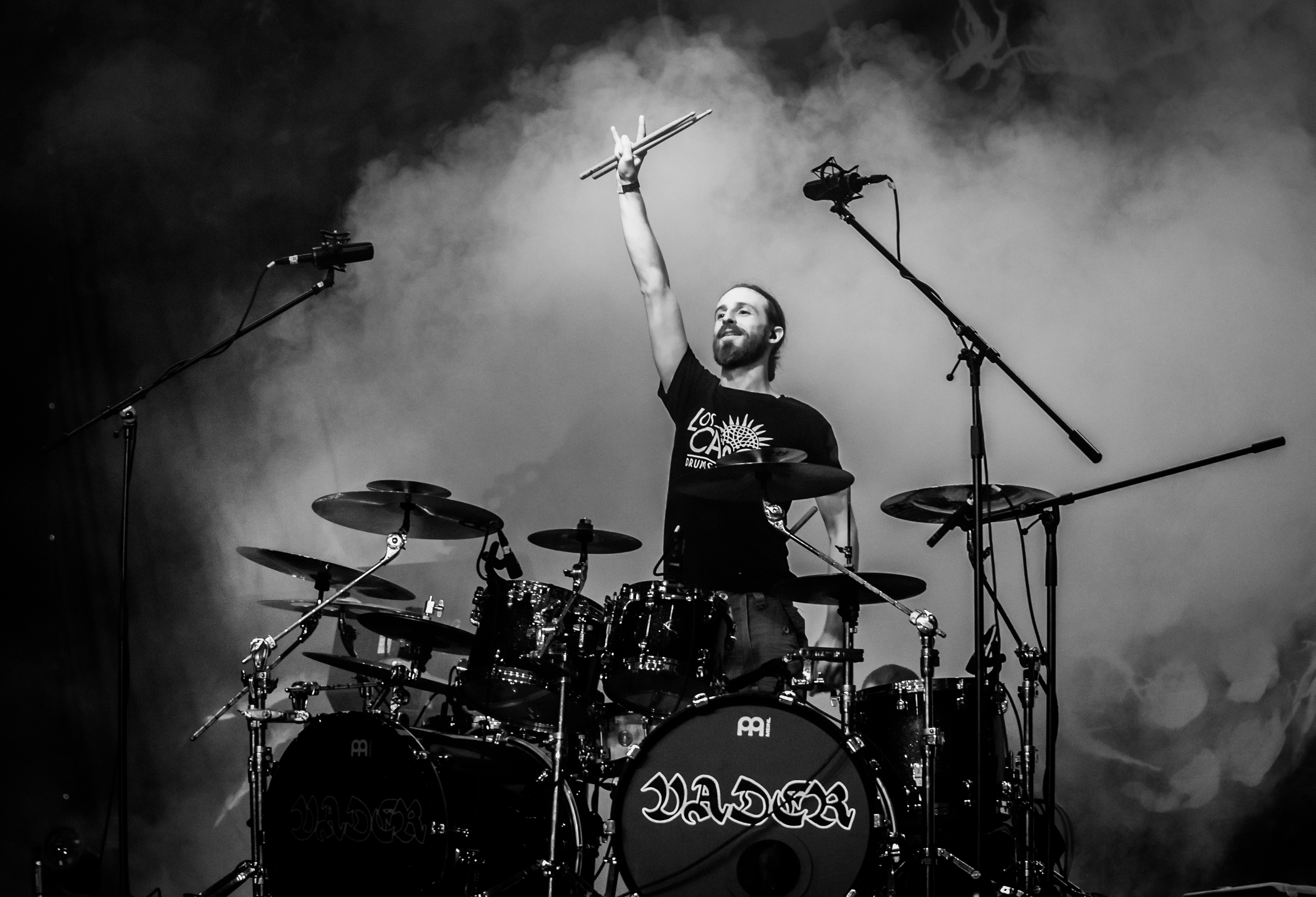
James Stewart at Wacken Open Air 2016

== Musical style, impact and legacy ==
Graham Hartmann of Loudwire said, "Until Behemoth’s new millennium rise, Vader served as Poland’s biggest death metal export. They challenged their contemporaries in the speed department alongside mechanized riffing as frontman Piotr “Peter” Wiwczarek spilled the secrets of the ‘Necronimicon’ and other magical mysteries. The sewer monster sounds that emanate from his throat have a whirring quality, but he manages to be intelligible in his delivery, perfectly enunciating each word."

The name of American rock band Eagles of Death Metal was influenced by Vader. When a friend was trying to introduce Queens of the Stone Age frontman Josh Homme to the death metal genre, he played Vader's music. Homme called them "The Eagles of death metal." After coining this phrase, he wondered what a cross between the Eagles and a death metal band would sound like. Afterwards, the phrase became the name of his band.

== Band members ==
Current

- Piotr "Peter" Wiwczarek — lead guitar (1983–present), lead vocals (1988–present), studio bass (1989–2011)
- Marek "Spider" Pająk — rhythm guitar (2010–present)
- Tomasz "Hal" Halicki — bass (2011–present)
- Michał Andrzejczyk — drums (2022–present)
- Maurycy "Mauser" Stefanowicz — rhythm guitar (1997–2008, 2024–present; live guest 2023)

== Discography ==
- The Ultimate Incantation (1992)
- De Profundis (1995)
- Black to the Blind (1997)
- Litany (2000)
- Revelations (2002)
- The Beast (2004)
- Impressions in Blood (2006)
- Necropolis (2009)
- Welcome to the Morbid Reich (2011)
- Tibi et Igni (2014)
- The Empire (2016)
- Solitude in Madness (2020)

== Awards ==
Fryderyk Awards
Year	Category	Nominated work	Note
1997	Hard & Heavy Album of the Year (Album roku – hard & heavy)	Black to the Blind	Nominated
2000	Hard & Heavy Album of the Year (Album roku – hard & heavy)	Litany	Nominated
2002	Heavy Metal Album of the Year (Album roku – heavy metal)	Revelations	Nominated
2004	Metal Album of the Year (Album roku metal)	The Beast	Nominated
2006	Rock/Metal Album of the Year (Album roku rock/ metal)	Impressions in Blood	Nominated
2009	Heavy Metal Album of the Year (Album roku heavy metal)	Necropolis	Nominated
2012	Heavy Metal Album of the Year (Album roku heavy metal)	Welcome to the Morbid Reich	Won
