= Wacław Kiełtyka =

Polish guitarist (born 1981)

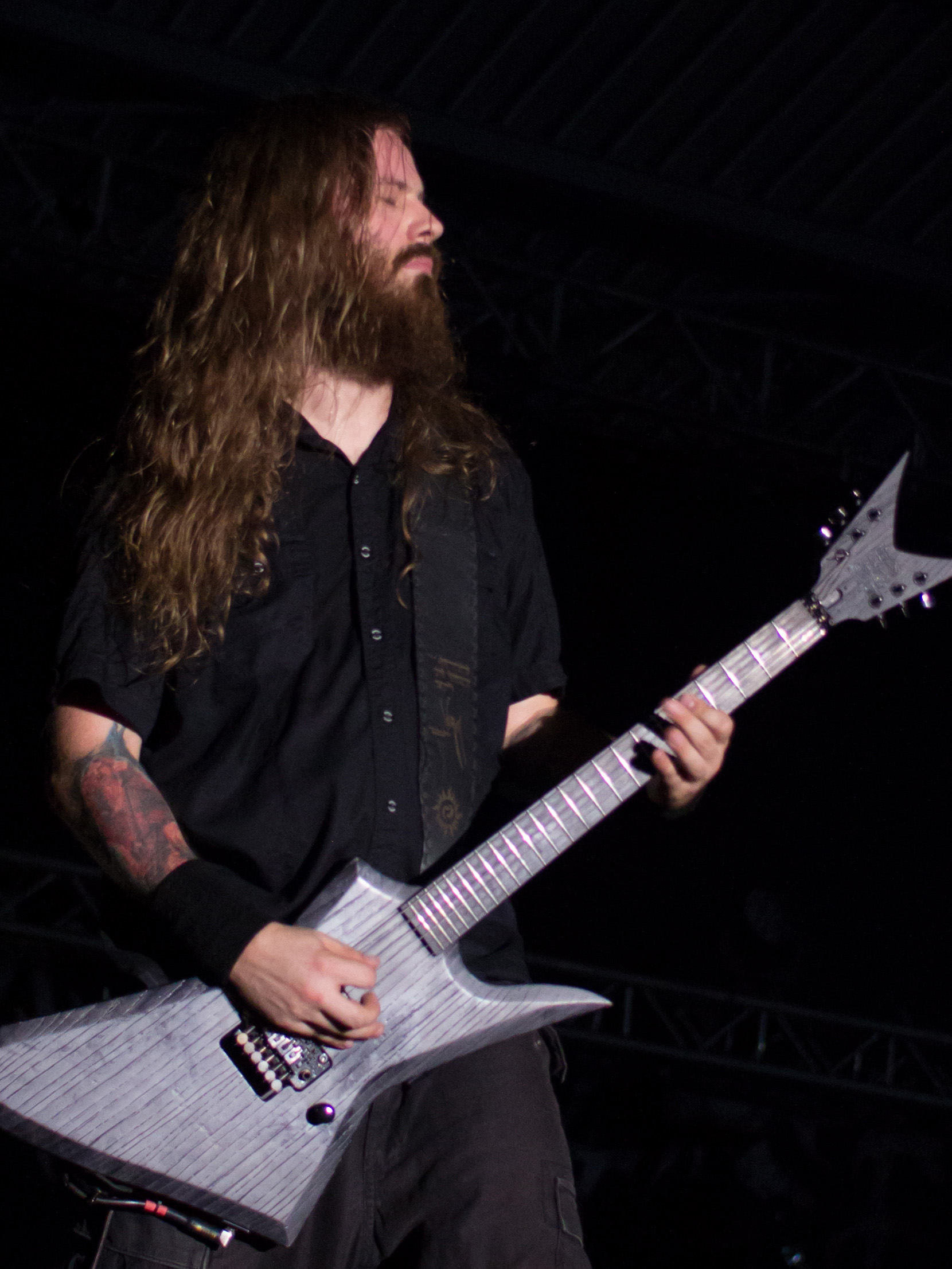
- Kiełtyka in 2014

Background information
- Also known as: Vogg
- Born: 17 December 1981 (age 44); Krosno, Poland
- Genres: Technical death metal; death metal; symphonic black metal; avant-garde metal
- Occupation: Musician
- Instruments: Guitar, Accordion
- Years active: 1996–present
- Member of: Decapitated, Lux Occulta
- Formerly of: Machine Head, Vader, Sceptic
- Children: 2
- Relatives: Witold Kiełtyka (brother); Wojciech Kiełtyka (brother)

Wacław "Vogg" Kiełtyka (born 17 December 1981) is a Polish musician, best known as the guitarist of the death metal band Decapitated and the former lead guitarist of Machine Head. Kiełtyka has also been the guitarist of Lux Occulta since 1998, and is a former member of Sceptic and Vader. Kiełtyka auditioned for Morbid Angel after the departure of Erik Rutan in 2006.

Before joining Vader in 2009, Kiełtyka was a music store salesman. He also worked as a guitar technician for the band Hypocrisy.

As well as being a guitar player, Kiełtyka is a classically-trained accordionist. He graduated from the Academy of Music in Kraków as an accordionist, and some Lux Occulta releases have featured his accordion playing.

== Instruments ==
=== Guitars ===
- Ibanez LA Custom Shop Destroyer with EMGs
- Ibanez Iceman 7 String Custom (Blood Mantra, and live performances)
- Ibanez Iceman 6 String Custom
- Ibanez Apex 7 String
- Ibanez RGD 7 String
- Ran Thor Custom 6 String (live performances)
- Dean ML Custom Shop (Carnival Is Forever, and live performances)
- Gibson Shred V (Carnival Is Forever, and live performances)
- Washburn Custom Dime (live performances)
- Custom RAN guitars with EMG 81 (Winds of Creation, Nihility, The Negation, Organic Hallucinosis, and live performances)
- Ibanez Universe (Organic Hallucinosis)
- ESP 7-string Custom Shop Seth (Carnival Is Forever)
- OLP MM4 SSPG RP (live performances)
- Washburn EA10N 6 (live performances)
- ESP LTD SC-607 BK

=== Amplifiers, cabinets, and effects ===
- EVH 5150 Amplifiers and Cabinets (Blood Mantra, and live performances)
- BOSS Pedals: NS-2, DD-3, TU-2 (live performances)
- Digitech Whammy Pedal (live performances)
- Laboga Mr. Hector Amplifier (live performances)
- Laboga Cabintes 4×12 V30 (live performances)
- Morley Bad Horsie II (live performances)
- Mesa Boogie Dual Rectifier Amplifier (Winds of Creation)
- Mesa Boogie Triple Rectifier Amplifier (Nihility, The Negation)
- Crate Excalibur Amplifier (Nihility, Carnival Is Forever)
- Marshall Valvestate Amplifier (Nihility, Carnival Is Forever)
- Randall Warhead Amplifier (Organic Hallucinosis, and live performances)
- Bogner Ubershall Amplifier (Carnival Is Forever)
- Diezel Herbert Amplifier (Carnival Is Forever)
- VHT Pitbull Amplifier (Carnival Is Forever)
- Randall RH300 Amplifier (live performances)
- Engl Special Edition E670 Amplifier (live performances)

== Legal issues ==
On 9 September 2017, all four members of Decapitated (Michal Łysejko, Kiełtyka, Rafał Piotrowski and Hubert Więcek) were arrested in Santa Ana, California after a show, and were charged with first-degree kidnapping in relation to an incident alleged to have happened after the band's show at Spokane, Washington's The Pin on 31 August 2017. Prior to the arrest, the band members had offered to surrender to the police as soon as they had learned of an investigation, but never heard anything back.

During the alleged incident, two women were held in the band's tour bus against their will. Of the two women, one was able to escape. The other informed police that each member of the band raped her on the bus.

After being extracted to Spokane, each band member was formally charged with rape in October 2017. Piotrowski and Kiełtyka were both charged with second degree rape, while Łysejko and Więcek's charges were for third degree rape. This was in contrast to earlier reports, which had depicted Piotrowski and Więcek as the primary aggressors. Kiełtyka was represented by defense attorney Steve Graham. All members of the band plead not guilty to their respective criminal charges.

Later in October the band was released from jail, with each member paying $100,000 in bail and being required to surrender their passports.

Charges were dropped by prosecutors in January 2018, citing the "well-being of the victim" and "in the interest of justice", and the scheduled trial later that month was cancelled. The charges were dropped without prejudice, leaving the possibility of future charges open. According to Piotrowski's attorney Jeffry Finer, the accuser was heavily involved in the decision to drop charges. The defence attorneys also highlighted testimonies from numerous concert attendees and musicians from other bands in support of the band's version of events.

In March 2018, Kiełtyka wrote a lengthy statement on behalf of the band where he announced the band's return and addressed the band's hiatus from music resulting from the criminal charges. Decrying the accusations made against the band as false, he wrote, "Does sexual harassment happen and do crimes against women exist? Yes, and it is horrible. Do false accusations happen? Yes, this really happens. And it is also horrible. (...) We cannot and we will never accept someone else's narration about who we are. That is why we have chosen to return with the band. We know who we are and we can hold our heads and our music high with that knowledge."

== Discography ==
=== With Decapitated ===
- Cemetarial Gardens (1997, Self-Released)
- The Eye of Horus (1998, Self-Released)
- Winds of Creation (2000, Wicked World, Earache Records)
- Polish Assault (2000, Relapse Records - split with Yattering, Damnable, and Lost Soul)
- The First Damned (2000, Metal Mind Productions)
- Nihility (2002, Earache Records)
- The Negation (2004, Earache Records)
- Organic Hallucinosis (2006, Earache Records)
- Human's Dust (2008, Metal Mind Productions)
- Carnival Is Forever (2011, Nuclear Blast)
- Blood Mantra (2014, Nuclear Blast)
- Anticult (2017, Nuclear Blast)
- Cancer Culture (2022, Earache)

=== With Lux Occulta ===
- My Guardian Anger (1999, Pagan Records, Metal Mind Productions)
- The Mother and the Enemy (2001, Metal Mind Productions, Maquiavel Music Ent.)
- Kołysanki (2014, Trzecie Ucho)

=== With Machine Head ===
- Of Kingdom and Crown (2022, Nuclear Blast, Imperium Recordings)

=== With Vader ===
- Vader - Necropolis (2009, Nuclear Blast)

=== Guest appearances ===
- Blindead - Autoscopia / Murder In Phazes (2008, Deadline Records)
- Virgin Snatch - Act of Grace (2008, Mystic Production)
- Thy Disease - Anshur-Za (2009, Mystic Production)
- Neolith - Individual Infernal Idimmu (2009, Psycho Records)
- Crionics - N.O.I.R. (2010, MSR Productions)
- Acid Drinkers - Fishdick Zwei - The Dick Is Rising Again (2010, Mystic Production)
- Saratan - "Antireligion" (2010, My Kingdom Music)
- Death Denied - Appetite For Booze (EP, 2011)
- Newbreed - Newbreed (2011, Metal Mind Productions)
- Ketha - 2nd Sight (2012, Instant Classic)
- Deadsquad - Catharsis (2022, Snakegoat Music)

Preceded by Phil Demmel	Machine Head lead guitarist 2019–2023	Succeeded by Reece Scruggs
