= Carnival Is Forever =

- Cover art by Łukasz Jaszak

Studio album by Decapitated
- Released: 12 July 2011
- Recorded: 9 February – 31 March 2011
- Studio: RG Studio, Gdańsk, Poland
- Genre: Technical death metal, groove metal
- Length: 42:30
- Label: Nuclear Blast, Mystic Production, Nippon Columbia
- Producer: Wacław "Vogg" Kiełtyka, Daniel Bergstrand

Decapitated chronology
Organic Hallucinosis (2006)	Carnival Is Forever (2011)	Blood Mantra (2014)

Alternative cover
- Special edition CD+DVD

Carnival Is Forever is the fifth studio album by Polish death metal band Decapitated. It was released on 12 July 2011 via Nuclear Blast. Carnival Is Forever was produced by Wacław "Vogg" Kiełtyka with Daniel Bergstrand.

Carnival Is Forever is Decapitated's first album to feature vocalist Rafał "Rasta" Piotrowski, and their only album to feature bassist Filip "Heinrich" Hałucha and drummer Kerim "Krimh" Lechner.

== Background ==
In 2009, after a period of disbandment, Decapitated's guitarist, composer and founding member Wacław "Vogg" Kiełtyka reformed the band with Austrian drummer Kerim "Krimh" Lechner, vocalist Rafał Piotrowski, and bassist Filip "Heinrich" Hałucha. Throughout 2010, the band toured in Europe, United States, Australia and New Zealand.

Decapitated entered RG Studio in Gdańsk, Poland on 9 February 2011 to record Carnival Is Forever, the follow-up to Organic Hallucinosis (2006). The album was produced by Kiełtyka, and the drum tracks were recorded with Daniel Bergstrand. In order to achieve "the 'true', organic and natural sound", the band recorded with live drums (without using drum triggers) and without double guitar tracks.

Several riffs on the new album were created with previous drummer Witold "Vitek" Kiełtyka. The almost two-month recording session finished on 31 March. The cover art was created by Łukasz Jaszak. The lyrics were contributed by Jarosław Szubrycht, the vocalist for Lux Occulta.

== Critical reception ==
Professional ratings
Review scores
Source	Rating
AllMusic	4/5 stars
About.com	4/5 stars
Blabbermouth.net	8/10 stars
Brave Words	9/10 stars
Revolver	2.5/5 stars
Teraz Rock	4/5 stars

Eduardo Rivadavia of AllMusic said "[...] implausibly heavy, musically vicious and polyrhythmically busy numbers such as "The Knife," "United," "404," and "Pest" (all of which owe a trick or two to Meshuggah, Gojira, and even Byzantine) appear to be at war with themselves—such is the instrumental complexity displayed by each musician as he fights to out-shred his bandmates." Dave Schalek of About.com noted Decapitated musicians skills "[...] the quality of the musicianship is as high as ever. Vogg’s riffing and staccato time changes are tight and flawlessly played, and drummer Krimh fills out the sound with perfect accompaniment to Vogg’s frenetic riffing."

Scott Alisoglu of Blabbermouth.net also praised musicianship: "In what turns out to be an ace rhythm section, bassist Filip Halucha and Kerim "Krimh" Lechner deliver the rhythmic goods in the form of tight, acrobatic performances and some very colorful percussion that both contrasts and syncs up with all those gouging and biting Waclaw riffs."

== Track listing ==
All lyrics are written by Jarosław Szubrycht.

No.	Title	Music	Length
1.	"The Knife"	Wacław Kiełtyka, Witold Kiełtyka, Kerim Lechner	4:31
2.	"United"	Kiełtyka, Lechner	5:24
3.	"Carnival Is Forever"	Kiełtyka, Kiełtyka, Lechner	8:49
4.	"Homo Sum"	Kiełtyka, Kiełtyka, Lechner	4:33
5.	"404"	Kiełtyka, Kiełtyka, Lechner	5:08
6.	"A View from a Hole"	Kiełtyka, Lechner	6:11
7.	"Pest"	Kiełtyka, Kiełtyka, Lechner	3:36
8.	"Silence" (Instrumental)	Kiełtyka	4:18
Total length:			42:30

Special edition DVD
No.	Title	Length
1.	"Studio Report 2011"	19:35

== Personnel ==
=== Decapitated ===
- Rafał "Rasta" Piotrowski – vocals
- Wacław "Vogg" Kiełtyka – guitars, production
- Filip "Heinrich" Hałucha – bass
- Kerim "Krimh" Lechner – drums

=== Additional musicians ===
- Bartosz Hervy (Blindead) – keyboards

=== Production ===
- Jarosław Szubrycht – lyrics
- Daniel Bergstrand – mixing, drum production
- Arkadiusz "Malta" Malczewski – engineering
- Rickard Sporrong – mastering
- Łukasz Jaszak – cover, design, photos
- Wojciech Kiełtyka – consultant, help, lyric revision

== Charts ==
Chart (2011)	Peak position
US Billboard Top Heatseekers	11
US Billboard Top Heatseekers (Northeast)	4
US Billboard Top Heatseekers (Pacific)	8

== Release history ==
Region/Country	Date	Label	Format
Poland	12 July 2011	Riffs Factory/Mystic Production	CD, CD+DVD
United States	12 July 2011	Nuclear Blast	CD, LP, CD+DVD
Europe	15 July 2011	Nuclear Blast	CD, LP, CD+DVD
Japan	20 July 2011	Nippon Columbia	CD
Argentina	20 July 2011	Icarus Music	CD
