= The First Damned =

- Cover art by Jacek Wiśniewski

Compilation album by Decapitated
- Released: 20 November 2000
- Recorded: June 1997, October 1998, Manek Studio, Sanok, Poland
- Genre: Technical death metal
- Length: 56:36
- Label: Metal Mind

Decapitated chronology
Winds of Creation (2000)	The First Damned (2000)	Nihility (2002)

The First Damned is the first compilation album by Polish death metal band Decapitated. It was released on 20 November 2000. It is a compilation of demos, Cemeterial Gardens and The Eye of Horus, and two additional live tracks recorded during the Thrash 'Em All Festival in 2000. The First Damned was released on one disc.

== Track listing ==
All music written and composed by Decapitated. All lyrics written by Sauron, except where noted.

1. "Intro" – 0:16
2. "The Eye of Horus" – 5:28
3. "Blessed" – 5:06
4. "The First Damned" – 5:48
5. "Nine Steps" – 4:55
6. "Dance Macabre" – 2:49
7. "Mandatory Suicide" – 3:29 (Slayer cover)
8. "Destiny" – 5:33
9. "Way to Salvation" – 3:54
10. "Ereshkigal" – 3:47
11. "Cemeteral Gardens" – 6:19
12. "Way to Salvation" (live) – 3:58
13. "Nine Steps" (live) – 5:14

== Personnel ==
=== Decapitated ===
- Wojciech "Sauron" Wąsowicz – vocals
- Wacław "Vogg" Kiełtyka – guitars
- Marcin "Martin" Rygiel – bass
- Witold "Vitek" Kiełtyka – drums

=== Production ===
- Bartlomiej Kuźniak – mastering
- Mariusz Kurasz – engineering
- Piotr Łukaszewski – engineering
- Arkadiusz Malczewski – engineering
- Jacek Wiśniewski – cover art
