= Kerim Lechner =

Austrian musician (born 1989)

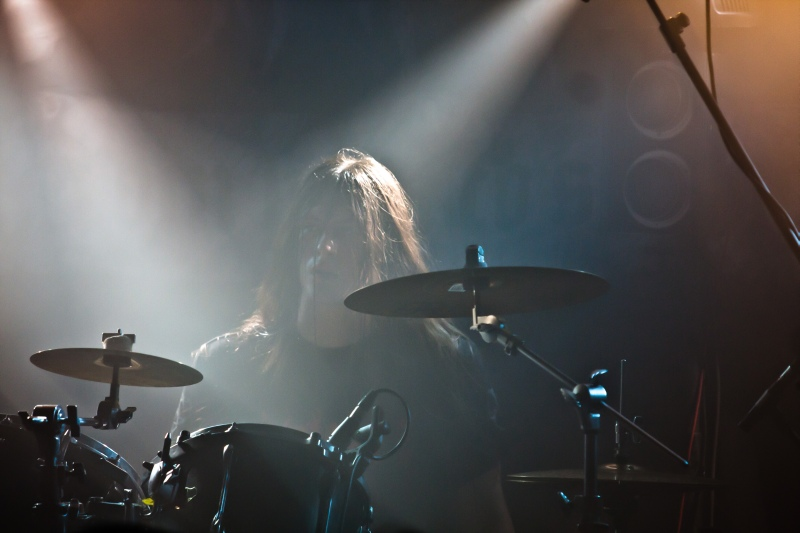
- Kerim Lechner, 2010

Background information
- Also known as: Krimh
- Born: Kerim Lechner; 26 January 1989 (age 37)
- Origin: Wiener Neustadt, Austria
- Genres: Technical death metal; death metal; progressive metal
- Occupation: Musician
- Instruments: Guitar; drums; bass guitar; piano
- Years active: 2006–present

Kerim "Krimh" Lechner (born 26 January 1989) is an Austrian musician, best known for his drumming work for Polish death metal band Decapitated. He is currently the drummer for Greek symphonic death metal band Septicflesh.

Before joining Decapitated, Lechner played in symphonic black metal band Thorns of Ivy from 2006 to 2009. Lechner joined Decapitated starting after their hiatus from 2007 to 2009, replacing deceased former drummer Witold Kiełtyka. Lechner played in the band until leaving in September 2012, performing on the band's album Carnival Is Forever.

In 2013, Lechner started an online fundraiser to fund his independently released solo album, titled Explore, released on 26 September 2013. Later in 2013, Lechner filled in on drums for Polish death metal band Behemoth, due to drummer Zbigniew Robert Promiński undergoing surgery.

In December 2013, Lechner posted videos of himself playing the Slipknot songs "People = Shit" and "Eyeless" as an audition to be the band's next drummer, following the departure of Joey Jordison. However, his speculative application was eventually unsuccessful.

Lechner endorses Meinl, Tama, Promark, Remo and Czarcie Kopyto.

In 2014, Lechner toured with Polish symphonic black metal band Vesania.

On 15 December 2014 it was announced that Lechner had joined Septicflesh as the new drummer.

On 26 April 2017 Lechner released a new album, titled Gedankenkarusell, collaborating among others with Rafał "Rasta" Piotrowski (Decapitated), Patryk Zwolinski (formerly of Blindead), Chris "VokillCovers" Breetzi (formerly of Upon a Red Sky), Zofia "Wielebna" Fraś (Obscure Sphinx) and Silva Raziel (Thorns of Ivy).

Lechner is also a member of the death metal supergroup Act of Denial, whose debut album Negative was released on August 13, 2021.

== Discography ==
With Thorns of Ivy

- "Deathwish" (single, 2007, self-released)
- "Beneath Seemingly Dead Soil" (single, 2008, self-released)

With Mondstille

- Am Ende... (2008, White Bird Records)

With Decapitated

- Carnival Is Forever (2011, Nuclear Blast)

With Redemptor

- The Jugglernaut (2014, self-released)

As Krimh

- Explore (2013, self-released)
- Krimhera (2014, self-released)
- Gedankenkarussell (2017, self-released)

With Septicflesh

- Codex Omega (2017, Season of Mist)
- Modern Primitive (2022, Nuclear Blast)
- Amphibians (EP, 2025, Nuclear Blast)

With Harakiri for the Sky

- Arson (2018, Art of Propaganda)
- Mære (2021, Art of Propaganda)

With Act of Denial

- Negative (2021, Crusader Records)

With Dååth

- The Deceivers (2024, Metal Blade)
