= Blood Mantra =

- Cover art by Łukasz Jaszak

Studio album by Decapitated
- Released: 22 September 2014
- Recorded: 2014
- Studio: Hertz Studio, Białystok, Poland
- Genre: Groove metal, technical death metal
- Length: 39:37
- Label: Nuclear Blast, Mystic Production
- Producer: Wojtek and Sławek Wiesławscy

Decapitated chronology
Carnival Is Forever (2011)	Blood Mantra (2014)	Anticult (2017)

Singles from Blood Mantra
- 1. "The Blasphemous Psalm to the Dummy God Creation" Released: 8 August 2014

Blood Mantra is the sixth studio album by Polish death metal band Decapitated. It was released on 22 September 2014 in Poland via Mystic Production and later in September via Nuclear Blast Records in other regions. Blood Mantra was produced by Wojtek and Sławek Wiesławscy. It is the band's first album to feature drummer Michał Łysejko and their only album to feature bassist Paweł Pasek. The song "The Blasphemous Psalm to the Dummy God Creation" was released as a single on 8 August 2014. Two days earlier, the single was released as digital stream on Nuclear Blast YouTube profile.

== Background ==
Blood Mantra is the follow-up to Decapitated's 2011 album Carnival Is Forever. It is the recording debut of drummer Michał Łysejko with the band, who joined the band in January 2014, and also the first album to feature bassist Paweł Pasek. It was recorded at Hertz Studio in Bialystok, Poland, with producers Wojtek and Sławek Wiesławscy. The album cover art was created by Polish artist Łukasz Jaszak.

Guitarist Wacław "Vogg" Kiełtyka commented on the album, "Extreme and groove — I think that's the best way to describe our new album. This time we feel that we have something totally crushing and huge. Blood Mantra is the most heavy and mature album we ever did in our career. I cannot wait to start to play songs live because riffs are soo deep and powerful." He also stated, "We flirt with various tempos mixing death metal with grindcore and almost outright black metal atmosphere together with more, so to speak, 'crowd-puller' beats verging on groovy, almost stoner-rock climates. There are also a few more modern metal rhythmic riffs where we return to the climate of Organic Hallucinosis album. I'm certain that the very fact we are again, after 9 years, in Hertz studio will evoke the spirit of that album. The vocals sound very promising. Rasta [Rafał Piotrowski] is a much more experienced vocalist compared to the Carnival Is Forever album times. And his voice sounds more powerful and deeper."

A music video for "Instinct" was released in October.

== Critical reception ==
Professional ratings
Review scores
Source	Rating
About.com	3.5/5 stars
Blabbermouth.net	(8.5/10)
Exclaim!	4.5/5 stars
The Quietus	Positive
Revolver	4/5 stars

In a Blood Mantra review, Revolver stated: "Twelve years after Poland’s Decapitated raised the death-metal bar with its mighty sophomore album, Nihility, the band’s dynamic arrangements and scalpel-edged musicianship are still a wonder to behold".

According to Exclaim!, "Blood Mantra features the band's signature well-executed style, but with the experimental twists that Decapitated have mastered over the years and have provided the distinguishing factor between albums. The band's trademark crushing technicality and heavy, aggressive grooves ("Exiled in Flesh," "Veins") juxtapose with new elements such as melodic passages and avant-garde structures ("Blindness," "Red Sun")".

== Track listing ==
All lyrics are written by Rafał "Rasta" Piotrowski; all music is composed by Wacław "Vogg" Kiełtyka

No.	Title	Length
1.	"Exiled in Flesh"	4:05
2.	"The Blasphemous Psalm to the Dummy God Creation"	2:31
3.	"Veins"	5:04
4.	"Blood Mantra"	5:05
5.	"Nest"	6:25
6.	"Instinct"	5:49
7.	"Blindness"	7:37
8.	"Red Sun" (Instrumental)	3:01
9.	"Moth Defect" (Bonus Track)	6:21
Total length:		46:10

Special edition DVD
No.	Title	Length
1.	"Diary 2010–2014"

== Personnel ==
=== Decapitated ===
- Wacław "Vogg" Kiełtyka – guitars, button accordion
- Rafał "Rasta" Piotrowski – vocals
- Paweł Pasek – bass
- Michał Łysejko – drums

=== Production ===
- Wojtek and Sławek Wiesławscy – production, mixing, mastering, recording
- Łukasz Jaszak – artwork

== Charts ==
Chart (2014)	Peak position
Polish Albums (ZPAV)	11
UK Indie Albums Chart	30
US Top Heatseekers	5

== Release history ==
Formats	Region	Date	Label
CD, CD+DVD, LP, LP+CD, digital download	Poland	September 22, 2014	Mystic Production
CD, CD+DVD, LP, LP+CD, digital download	Europe	September 26, 2014	Nuclear Blast
CD, CD+DVD, LP, LP+CD, digital download	UK	September 29, 2014	Nuclear Blast
CD, CD+DVD, LP, LP+CD, digital download	North America	September 30, 2014	Nuclear Blast
