= Atrophia Red Sun =

Polish death metal band

- Origin: Kraków, Poland
- Genres: Death metal, doom metal (early)
- Years active: 1994–2008 (hiatus in 2005)
- Label: Empire Records
- Past members: Kuba Kogut; Piotr "VX" Kopeć; Paweł "Fafson" Kolasa; Michał "Banan" Nasiadka; Grzegorz "Felo" Feliks; Łukasz Wronka; Piotr "Pita" Stepkowski; Marcin "Bochaj" Bochajewski; Rafał "Kastor" Kastory; Paweł Węgrzyn; Miłosz "Milo" Likowski; Adrian "Covan" Kowanek
- Website: ars.metal.pl

Atrophia Red Sun was a Polish death metal band from Kraków.

== Biography ==
Keyboardist Piotr Kopeć formed the band in 1994. The first line-up consisted of Adrian Kowanek (vocals), Piotr Stepkowski (guitar), Marcin Bochajewski (guitar), Michal Nasiadka (bass guitar), and Pawel Wegrzyn (drums). Their first effort, Painful Love, was released in 1995 by the label Croon Records; its songs could be described as doom metal with lyrics dealing with love.

In 1997, Atrophia Red Sun recorded their second album, Fears, a different album musically and lyrically — a personal and pessimistic view of the world. The band had turned from doom metal to a more progressive sound.

1998 and 1999 brought many changes. The band was without guitarists and a bass player, and it wasn't until 2001 that they started rehearsing again with a full line-up. In 2001 and 2002, Atrophia Red Sun recorded a promo and a demo, and in 2003 they released Twisted Logic, their third full-length album. The band took a year off in 2005.

On October 29, 2007, the tour bus for fellow Polish death metal band Decapitated was in an accident with a truck carrying wood in Gomel, on the Russia/Belarus border. Both Witold Kieltyka (also known as Vitek) and Adrian Kowanek (who was the vocalist for that band at the time) were seriously injured. While it was initially believed that they were taken to Moscow to be treated after treatment at a local hospital, it was later confirmed that they were only taken to be treated in Novozybkov, where they have remained for the time being. On November 2, 2007, Vitek died from his injuries from the accident. He was 23 years old. Covan has since shown slow but progressive signs of improvement. Covan's family released a short update in October 2008 concerning his improving condition.

In 2008, Kowanek left Decapitated and disbanded Atrophia Red Sun due to his slow recovery. As a result from the accident, he had reportedly suffered from cardiac arrest and cerebral hypoxia, which left him paralyzed and using a wheelchair.

== Former band members ==
- Michał "Banan" Nasiadka - bass (1994-1998)
- Grzechotka - drums (1994-2003)
- Piotr "Pita" Stepkowski - guitars (1994-1998)
- Marcin "Bochaj" Bochajewski - guitars (1994-1998)
- Adrian "Covan" Kowanek - vocals (1994-2008)
- Paweł "Fafson" Kolasa - bass (1999-2000, 2004-2008)
- Grzegorz "Felo" Feliks - bass (2000-2003)
- Łukasz Wronka - bass (2003-2004)
- Miłosz "Milo" Likowski - drums (2003-2004)
- Kuba Kogut - drums (2004-2008)
- Piotr "VX" Kopeć - keyboards, programming (1994-2008)
- Rafał "Kastor" Kastory - guitar (1999-2005)

== Discography ==
- Painfull Love (CD, Croon, 1995)
- Fears (CD, Morbid Noizz, 1997)
- Promo 2001 (Demo, 2001)
- Demo 2002 (Demo, 2002)
- Twisted Logic (CD, Empire/Adipocere, 2003)
