= Adrian Kowanek =

Polish metal vocalist (born 1977)

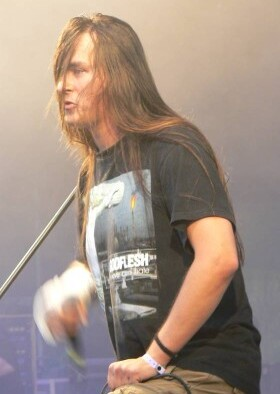
- Kowanek performing in 2006

Background information
- Also known as: Covan
- Born: 4 October 1977 (age 48)
- Genres: Death metal, extreme metal
- Occupation: Vocalist
- Years active: 1994–2007
- Formerly of: Decapitated, Atrophia Red Sun
- Website: wakeupcovan.com

Adrian Kowanek (born 4 October 1977), also known as Covan, is a Polish musician who was the former lead vocalist of the death metal bands Atrophia Red Sun and Decapitated. He was also the touring vocalist for technical death metal band Sceptic.

== Accident ==
On 29 October 2007, the tour bus for Decapitated was involved in an accident with a truck carrying wood in Gomel, on the Russia–Belarus border. Both Witold Kieltyka (also known as Vitek) and Kowanek were seriously injured. While it was initially believed that they were taken to Moscow to be treated after treatment at a local hospital, it was later confirmed that they were only taken to be treated in Novozybkov, where they remained. On 2 November 2007, Vitek died from his injuries from the accident. He was 23 years old. Covan showed slow but progressive signs of improvement. Covan's family released a short update in October 2008 concerning his improving condition.

In 2008, Kowanek left Decapitated during the band's hiatus, due to his slow recovery. He had reportedly suffered from cardiac arrest and cerebral hypoxia, which left him paralyzed and reliant on a wheelchair.

== Discography ==
=== With Decapitated ===
- Organic Hallucinosis (2006)

=== With Atrophia Red Sun ===
- Fears (1997)
- Twisted Logic (2003)

=== Guest appearances ===
- Thy Disease – Cold Skin Obsession (2002)
- Crionics – Armageddon's Evolution (2004)
- Thy Disease – Costumes of Technocracy (2014)
