= Dionysos (album) =

Studio album by Lux Occulta
- Released: November 17, 1997
- Recorded: Early to mid-1997
- Genre: Black metal
- Length: 46:58
- Labels: Pagan, Metal Mind
- Producer: Andrzej Bomba

Lux Occulta chronology
Forever Alone, Immortal (1996)	Dionysos (1997)	Maior Arcana: The Words That Turn Flesh into Light (1998)

Professional ratings
Review scores
Source	Rating
Rock Hard	7/10

Dionysos is the second studio album by Polish symphonic black metal band Lux Occulta (Latin for "Hidden Light"). The 2002 re-release of the album by Metal Mind includes the band's demo The Forgotten Arts, which can also be found on the band's Maior Arcana compilation, in its entirety as bonus material. Unlike the version on Maior Arcana, the version appended to this album retains the same running order as on the original release.

== Track listing ==
1. The Birth of the Race (7:39)
2. Blessed Be the Rain (7:22)
3. Chalice of Lunar Blood (8:47)
4. Nocturnal Dithyramb (6:41)
5. Ecstasy and Terror (9:18)
6. Upwards to Conquer Heaven (6:51)

== Personnel ==
=== Lux Occulta ===
- Jaroslaw "Jaro.Slav." Szubrycht: Vocals
- Kastor: Guitar
- Vogg (from Polish death metal band Decapitated): Guitar
- U.Reck: Keyboards
- Martin (also from Decapitated): Bass

=== Additional Musicians ===
- Jackie: Bass
- Kriss: Drums
- Flute: Marcin Rumiñski
- Female Vocals: Anna Wesolowska, Wizenna Nowotarska

== Production ==
- Executive Producer: Pagan Records
- Produced, Engineered, Mixed & Mastered By Andrzej Bomba
