= Human's Dust =

Video by Decapitated
- Released: 9 June 2008 (Europe); 10 June 2008 (United States)
- Recorded: October 2002, Łeg Studio, Kraków, Poland; March 2004, Spodek, Katowice, Poland; May 2002, Spodek, Katowice, Poland
- Genre: Technical death metal
- Label: Metal Mind
- Producer: Tomasz Dziubiński (executive)

Professional ratings
Review scores
Source	Rating
About.com	3.5/5 stars

Human's Dust is the first video album by Polish death metal band Decapitated. It contains the band's live performances and interviews from 2002 and 2004 from various locations. The DVD was released by Metal Mind Productions on 9 June 2008 in Europe and 10 June 2008 in the United States. The title comes from the song of the same name from the band's debut studio album, Winds of Creation.

== Background ==
The main feature of the DVD consists of the band's October 2002 live performance in Kraków, which was a part of their European tour with Vader and Krisiun. Bonus footage includes live performances recorded during Ozzfest in Poland in May 2002 and Metalmania festival in March 2004, the music video for "Winds of Creation", and three interviews recorded at various locations with Vitek, Vogg, Sauron and Martin. The DVD also includes a photo gallery, biography, discography, desktop images and weblinks.

The DVD was released via Metal Mind Productions on 9 June 2008 in Europe and 10 June 2008 in the United States.

== Track listing ==
All music written and composed by Decapitated. All lyrics written by Sauron, excepts noted.

Live in Kraków
No.	Title	Length
1.	"Nihility"	05:18
2.	"Eternity Too Short"	04:38
3.	"Way to Salvation"	03:43
4.	"Spheres of Madness"	04:53
5.	"Names"	04:04
6.	"Winds of Creation"	04:22
7.	"Babylon's Pride"	04:19
8.	"Suffer the Children" (Napalm Death cover)	04:38

Live at Ozzfest
No.	Title	Length
1.	"Spheres of Madness"	05:25
2.	"Eternity Too Short"	04:59
3.	"Babylon's Pride"	04:36

Live at Metalmania
No.	Title	Length
1.	"Three-dimensional Defect"	04:08
2.	"Lying and Weak"	03:33
3.	"Mother War"	04:05
4.	"Sensual Sickness"	04:12
5.	"Spheres of Madness"	05:12
6.	"The Negation"	05:07

Other bonus material
No.	Title	Length
1.	"Interview with Vitek and Vogg"	20:03
2.	"Interview with Vogg and Sauron"	5:32
3.	"Interview with Sauron and Martin"	14:44
4.	"Winds of Creation" (music video)	4:36

== Personnel ==
Decapitated

- Wacław "Vogg" Kiełtyka - guitars
- Witold "Vitek" Kiełtyka - drums
- Marcin "Martin" Rygiel - bass
- Wojciech "Sauron" Wąsowicz - vocals

Additional musicians

- Jacek Hiro - guitars (Note: Between 2000-2004 Decapitated toured occasionally as quintet, with addition of second guitarist Jacek Hiro. Live at Metalmania is the only one officially documented performance in Decapitated discography.)

Live in Kraków Production

- Jacek Dybowski - vision mixing
- Jakub Zańczuk - vision mixing assistant
- Artur Wojewwoda, Waldemar Szwajda - engineering
- Monika Krzanowska - recording
- Robert Nowak - recording assistant
- Piotr Brzeziński - sound mixing
- Jarosław Kaszyński - sound design
- Lucjan Siwczyk, Bogusław Dąbrowa-Kostka - lights
- Bartosz Cichoński, Zbigniew Jaorsz, Piotr Kotarba, Andrzej Nakowski, Roman Piotrowski, Dariusz Posłuszny, Agnieszka Światłoń, Aleksander Trafas - cameras
- Tomasz Pomarański - producer
- Elżbieta Nakowska - producer assistant
- Tomasz Dziubiński - executive producer
- Wojciech Dziubiński, Agnieszka Doborowolska, Justyna Szarkowska - executive producer assistants

Note

- Live in Kraków filmed and recorded in October 2002, Łeg Studio, Kraków, Poland
- Live at Metalmania filmed and recorded in March 2004, Metalmania Festival, Spodek, Katowice, Poland
- Live at Ozzfest filmed and recorded in May 2002, Ozzfest Festival, Spodek, Katowice, Poland
