= Anticult (album) =

Studio album by Decapitated
- Released: 7 July 2017
- Studio: Custom34 Studio, Gdańsk, Poland. Zed Studio, Chechlo, Poland
- Genre: Groove metal, technical death metal
- Length: 37:49
- Label: Nuclear Blast
- Producer: Wacław Kiełtyka

Decapitated chronology
Blood Mantra (2014)	Anticult (2017)	Cancer Culture (2022)

Singles from Anticult
- 1. "Never" Released: 28 April 2017; 2. "Earth Scar" Released: 16 June 2017; 3. "One-Eyed Nation" Released: 6 July 2017

Anticult is the seventh studio album by Polish death metal band Decapitated. It was released on 7 July 2017 by Nuclear Blast. It is the band's only album with bassist Hubert Więcek and their final album with drummer Michał Łysejko.

== Background ==
Daniel Bergstrand produced drums and mixed the album. Guitarist Wacław "Vogg" Kiełtyka stated about the songwriting process: "[This] album is one that we created together as a band. Our drummer, Michał [Łysejko], [helped] a lot with the arrangements and the songs. He's like the co-author of the songs. It's like I used to do with Vitek [Witold Kiełtyka]."

== Reception ==
Professional ratings
Review scores
Source	Rating
AllMusic	3.5/5 stars
Exclaim!	8/10
Metal Injection	8.5/10
Sputnikmusic	3.5/5 stars
Terrorizer	8/10

The song "One-Eyed Nation" was premiered by Alternative Press, which the magazine reviewed as "classic Decapitated: killer riffs, interesting leads and an undeniable sense of groove"; and described the band as "remaining one of death metal's elite" bands. Andy Walmsley of Terrorizer praised the album and described the band's development as "one of constant evolution, steadily incorporating more elements of groove, thrash, tech, and prog over the years, with every new album signifying a conscious state-change from the one before it." He concluded that Decapitated are "on their quest towards becoming the quintessential modern metal band."

== Track listing ==
All lyrics are written by Rafał "Rasta" Piotrowski; all music is composed by Wacław "Vogg" Kiełtyka and Michał Łysejko.

No.	Title	Length
1.	"Impulse"	6:02
2.	"Deathvaluation"	4:24
3.	"Kill the Cult"	4:40
4.	"One-Eyed Nation"	5:00
5.	"Anger Line"	3:45
6.	"Earth Scar"	5:10
7.	"Never"	6:05
8.	"Amen"	2:50
Total length:		37:49

== Personnel ==
Decapitated

- Rafał "Rasta" Piotrowski – vocals
- Wacław "Vogg" Kiełtyka – guitars, bass, piano
- Michał Łysejko – drums
- Hubert Więcek – bass

Production

- Daniel Bergstrand – drums production, mixing
- Wacław "Vogg" Kiełtyka – production
- Jan Galbas – engineering
- Tomasz "Zed" Zalewski – engineering
- Lukasz Lukaszewski – assistant engineer
- Lawrence Mackrory – mastering
- Lukasz Jaszak – cover art and layout
- Oskar Szramka – photography

== Charts ==
Chart (2017)	Peak position
Polish Albums (ZPAV)	4
Scottish Albums (OCC)	50
Swiss Albums (Schweizer Hitparade)	58
US Independent Albums (Billboard)	8
US Heatseekers Albums (Billboard)	2
