= Sceptic (band) =

Polish death metal band

- Origin: Kraków, Poland
- Genres: Technical death metal
- Years active: 1994–present
- Labels: Mystic Production, Empire, Last Episode, Crash, Candlelight, Szataniec
- Members: Jacek Hiro; Paweł Kolasa; Jakub Kogut; Marcin Urbaś
- Website: www.sceptic.pl

Sceptic is a death metal band from Kraków, Poland.

== History ==
Sceptic was founded in 1994 in Kraków, Poland initially under the name TORMENTOR, on the initiative of guitarists Jacek Hiro and Dariusz Styczen and drummer Maciej Zięba. A year later, already functioning as SCEPTIC, Dariusz Styczeń left the group and was replaced by Jacek Mrożek. In 1996, supplemented by a vocalist, the group recorded the first demo entitled "Demo'96". After the recordings, Stawiarski left the group, whose role was taken over by Mrożek. In the same year, the bassist Paweł Kolasa joined the band (associated with Atrophia Red Sun) with whom the band recorded the second demo entitled "Beyond Reality".

After the recordings, Jacek Mrożek and Maciek Zięba left the group. In their place, vocalist Marcin Urbaś and drummer Jakub Kogut (also known from Atrophia Red Sun) joined the group. With the new line-up, the band recorded their third release entitled "Demo'98". A few months later, the second guitarist Czesław Semla joined the group, with whom the band recorded their debut album at the turn of January and February 1999: "Blind Existence" released the same year by Mystic Production. Also in 1999, the group performed at the Thrash'em All Festival, preceding among others: Vader, Christ Agony and Yattering. During the concert, Adrian "Covan" Kowanek (Atrophia Red Sun) performed as a vocalist.

In February 2000 Jakub Kogut left the team, and Maciej Zięba, co-founder of the group, returned. Marcin Urbaś decided to develop his sports career and was replaced by Michał "Psycho" Senajko (Thy Disease). At the end of 2000, at Selani Studio in Olsztyn, the band started work on their second album: "Pathetic Being". The recordings were released in 2001 by Empire Records. As part of the promotion for the song "Pathetic Being", a music video directed by Adam Kuc was made. In February of the same year, Michał Skotniczny (Crionics) became the new vocalist, replacing Senajko. In August, Czesław Semla left the group and was replaced by Rafał Kastory from Atrophia Red Sun. In November 2001, Maciej Zięba left the band, and shortly afterwards Paweł Kolasa, who was replaced by Grzegorz Feliks (Atrophia Red Sun).

In February 2002 the last concert with Kastory and Zięba in this line-up took place. Jakub Chmura was hired as the drummer, while Michał Skotniczny was the second guitarist. In 2003, Skotniczny left the band, and Marcin Urbaś took over the vocal duties again. In July of the same year at Hertz Studio in Bialystok, the band recorded the third album tentatively titled "III". "Unbeliever's Script" was released on 25 September 2003, again on Empire Records. The album was promoted during concerts with guest vocalist Weronika Zbieg (Totem), replacing Urbas. In 2004, the band gave a number of concerts in Poland as part of the Empire Invasion Tour 2004 along with Dies Irae, Trauma and Shadows Land.

In August 2005 Grzegorz Feliks (bassist) left the band and was replaced by Marcin Halerz, a bassist known for his performances in Infernal Maze and Sourreal. The position of the singer was officially taken over by Weronika Zbieg. At the turn of September and October at Studio X in Olsztyn, the group began work on the fourth studio album. The album entitled "Internal Complexity" was released on 9 December of the same year by the Mystic Production music label. The album contains 2 versions of vocals, original vocals by Weronika Zbieg and an alternative version performed by Marcin Urbas, who also wrote all the lyrics. As part of the promotion for the song "Suddenly Awaken", a music video directed by Marcin Halerz was made. At the turn of September and October 2006, the group took part in the Rat Race Tour 2006. Virgin Snatch, Thy Disease and Rasta also participated in the tour. In 2008, Halerz left the band and was replaced by returning Paweł Kolasa. The line-up was also supplemented by a second guitarist – Wacław "Vogg" Kiełtyka (Decapitated). The musician performed with the band during sporadic concerts until 2010. In the same year, Kiełtyka was replaced by Daniel Kesler, a member of Redemptor. In the meantime SCEPTIC left Jakub Chmura, who was replaced by an old drummer: Jakub Kogut, who returned to the band. Another change in the line-up of SCEPTIC concerned Jakub Kogut, who was replaced on drums by James Stewart for several years. Jakub Kogut sat behind the drums again in 2019.

Preparations for the recording of the band's fifth release were in full swing, but SCEPTIC's plans slowed down due to the maternity leave of singer Weronika Zbieg. Weronika finally resigned from the position of SCEPTIC vocalist and Marcin Urbaś returned to her place in April 2022. Thus, the formation returned to almost the full line-up from the first studio album (not counting Czesław Semla). Between April and June SCEPTIC finalized the recordings for the new album, which was mixed and mastered by Piotr Mańkowski at Coverius Studio. In the meantime, under the supervision of Marcin Halerz, a music video was created for the song promoting the fifth release of the Cracovians entitled "All I Can Devour". Fifth studio album: "Nailed to Ignorance" was released on 30 September 2022.

== Band members ==
Current members

- Jacek Hiro – guitar (1994–present)
- Paweł Kolasa – bass (1996–2001, 2008–present)
- Marcin Urbaś – vocals (1998–2000, 2003–2004, 2022–present)
- Jakub Kogut – drums (1998–2000, 2010–2015, 2019–present)

Former members

- Maciej Zięba – drums (1994–1998, 2000–2002)
- Jacek Mrożek – vocals, guitar (1995–1997)
- Arkadiusz Stawiarski – vocals (1995–1998)
- Czesław Semla – guitar (1998–2001)
- Michał "Psycho" Senajko – vocals (2000–2001)
- Rafał "Kastor" Kastory – guitar (2001–2002)
- Grzegorz Feliks – bass (2001–2005)
- Jakub "Cloud" Chmura – drums (2002–2010)
- Weronika Zbieg – vocals (2004–2022)
- Marcin Halerz – bass (2005–2008)
- Daniel Kesler – guitar (2010–2014)
- James Stewart – drums (2015–2019)

Live members

- Dariusz Styczeń – guitar (1994–1995)
- Michał Skotniczny – vocals, guitar (2001–2003)
- Adrian "Covan" Kowanek – vocals (fill in) (1999)
- Wacław "Vogg" Kiełtyka – guitar (2008–2010)

Timeline

== Discography ==
=== Studio albums ===
Title	Album details
Blind Existence	Released: 1999; Label: Mystic Production; Formats: CD, CS
Pathetic Being	Released: 21 April 2001 (POL), 15 May 2001 (EU), 25 September 2001 (US); Label: Empire Records, Last Episode, Crash Music; Formats: CD, CS, digital download
Unbeliever's Script	Released: 25 September 2003 (POL), 6 April 2004 (EU); Label: Empire Records, Candlelight Records; Formats: CD
Internal Complexity	Released: 12 December 2005; Label: Mystic Production; Formats: CD
Nailed to Ignorance	Released: 30 September 2022; Label: Szataniec; Formats: CD, digital download

=== Music videos ===
Year	Title	Directed	Album
1999	"Beyond Reality"	Adam Kuc, Selani Studio	Blind Existence
1999	"Painful Silence"	Adam Kuc, Selani Studio	Blind Existence
2001	"Pathetic Being"	Adam Kuc, Selani Studio	Pathetic Being
2003	"Illusion Possessor"	Adam Kuc, Selani Studio	Unbeliever's Script
2005	"Suddenly Awaken"	Marcin Halerz	Internal Complexity
2022	" All I Can Devour"	Marcin Halerz	Nailed To Ignorance
