= My Guardian Anger =

Studio album by Lux Occulta
- Released: November 15, 1999
- Recorded: December 1998–January 1999
- Studio: Selani Studios
- Genre: Symphonic black metal
- Label: Pagan Records
- Producer: Andrzej Bomba and Lux Occulta

Lux Occulta chronology
Maior Arcana: The Words That Turn Flesh into Light (1998)	My Guardian Anger (1999)	The Mother and the Enemy (2001)

Professional ratings
Review scores
Source	Rating
Metal.de	10/10
Rock Hard	4/10

My Guardian Anger is the third studio album by the Polish symphonic black metal group Lux Occulta, and the first with newcomers Martin and Vogg from Decapitated.

Some releases of the album have "Heart of the Devil" and "Love (Garden of Aphrodite)" (from Maior Arcana) as bonus tracks. Note that, at least on the 2002 Metal Mind release, these are labelled in the wrong order; "Love (Garden of Aphrodite)" is track ten, despite being labelled as track nine. "Heart of the Devil" is a Danzig cover.

The album was rated a nine out of ten by Chronicles of Chaos.

== Track listing ==
1. The Heresiarch – 6:26
2. Kiss My Sword – 5:36
3. Triangle – 1:08
4. The Opening of Eleventh Sephirah – 9:34
5. Nude Sophia – 5:52
6. Cube – 1:04
7. Library on Fire – 7:10
8. Mane-Tekel-Fares – 9:12

== Personnel ==
=== Lux Occulta ===
- Fool: Vocals
- Magician: Rhythm Guitar
- Devil: Lead Guitar
- Hermit: Keyboards
- Sun: Bass
- Death: Drums
