= Forever Alone =

Forever alone may refer to:

- "Forever Alone", a song by Kakkmaddafakka from the 2013 album Six Months Is a Long Time
- "Forever Alone" (Paulo Londra song), a song by Paulo Londra from the 2019 album Homerun
- Forever Alone, Immortal, a 1996 album by the Polish symphonic black metal band Lux Occulta
- "FA" and "Forever Alone", alternative terms to describe involuntary celibates
- "Forever Alone," a rage comic meme character
