= Organic Hallucinosis =

- Cover art by Seth Siro Anton

Studio album by Decapitated
- Released: 7 February 2006
- Recorded: August 2005, Hertz Studio, Białystok, Poland
- Genre: Technical death metal
- Length: 32:39
- Labels: Earache, Teichiku, Soyuz Music
- Producer: Decapitated

Decapitated chronology
The Negation (2004)	Organic Hallucinosis (2006)	Carnival Is Forever (2011)

Organic Hallucinosis is the fourth studio album by Polish death metal band Decapitated. The album was released on 7 February 2006 in the United States, on 13 February in Europe and on 22 February in Japan. The release was followed by European and North American tours.

It is Decapitated's only album to feature vocalist Adrian "Covan" Kowanek, and their final album to feature bassist Marcin "Martin" Rygiel and drummer Witold "Vitek" Kiełtyka, in which the latter died at the age of 23 in a tour bus accident in Belarus that also seriously injured Covan.

== Background and release ==
In mid-2005, Decapitated's vocalist Wojciech "Sauron" Wąsowicz departed from the band and was replaced by Adrian "Covan" Kowanek. Organic Hallucinosis was recorded in August 2005 at Hertz Studio in Białystok, Poland with producers Slawek and Wojtek Wiesławski and features artwork and layout by Spiros Antoniou (Seth). The album was released by Earache Records on 7 February 2006 in the United States and on 13 February internationally. A music video was filmed for the song "Day 69" and released that year.

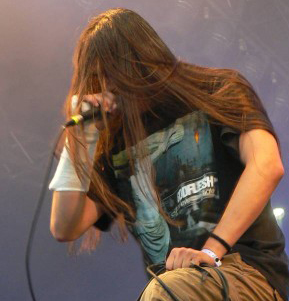
Organic Hallucinosis is the only album by Decapitated with Adrian "Covan" Kowanek.

A limited edition of 1000 bonus CDs were given away for free by Earache Records for people who purchased Organic Hallucinosis in United Kingdom independent stores. It contains tracks from live at Earache Christmas party, Rescue Rooms, Nottingham, 20 December 2004. A Japanese edition was released by Teichiku Records, which contains live bonus tracks taken from the same recording as the bonus CD.

The album's release was followed by a headlining European tour starting in September 2006 and a North American tour with Suffocation. Later on, Decapitated's bassist Marcin "Martin" Rygiel departed from the band.

In November, Decapitated's tour bus was involved in an automobile accident in Belarus that killed drummer Witold "Vitek" Kiełtyka at the age of 23 and seriously injured Covan. The band's guitarist Wacław "Vogg" Kiełtyka announced an indefinite hiatus.

== Critical reception ==
Professional ratings
Review scores
Source	Rating
Allmusic	3/5 stars
About.com	4/5 stars
Blabbermouth.net	8/10 stars
Kerrang!	5/5 stars
Stylus Magazine	B−

AllMusic stated about Organic Hallucinosis: "Launching off of their new frontman's more versatile skills in delivering various stages of deathly grunting, the band has stepped up the complexity of their songwriting to match, while establishing a non-traditional death metal aesthetic."

According to Kerrang!, "Decapitated have already released three classic albums; superbly conceived and executed eruptions of technical brilliance and razor-sharp songwriting that have turned these youthful Poles into one of the genre's most widely respected bands. Remarkably, Organic Hallucinosis takes that knack for producing extreme music with integrity and bagfuls of hooks even closer to perfection."

Blabbermouth.net stated later in 2010 about the album, "A hugely forward-thinking and ambitious album, Organic Hallucinosis defined Decapitated's sound and spawned a host of imitators."

Tomas Haake of the Swedish band Meshuggah announced a statement following the death of Vitek: "The metal community has lost one of the most talented and skillful drummers of our time! I remember when I first heard Decapitated's Organic Hallucinosis and it just blew me away! What a band and what a drummer! Vitek was a true talent and drummer genius".

== Track listing ==
All lyrics are written by Covan, except "A Poem About an Old Prison Man" written by Charles Manson; all music is composed by Decapitated.

No.	Title	Length
1.	"A Poem About an Old Prison Man"	4:42
2.	"Day 69"	3:14
3.	"Revelation of Existence (The Trip)"	4:39
4.	"Post (?) Organic"	5:45
5.	"Visual Delusion"	5:55
6.	"Flash-B(l)ack"	3:42
7.	"Invisible Control"	4:45
Total length:		32:39

Japanese edition
No.	Title	Length
8.	"Nihility (Anti-Human Manifesto)" (Nihility)	4:28
9.	"Spheres of Madness" (Nihility)	4:39

Ltd Edition Dual Disc CD/DVD
No.	Title	Length
1.	"Three Dimensional Defect" (The Negation)
2.	"The Fury" (The Negation)
3.	"Nihility (Anti-Human Manifesto)" (Nihility)
4.	"Negation" (The Negation)
5.	"Lying and Weak" (The Negation)
6.	"Spheres of Madness" (Nihility)
7.	"Mother War" (Nihility)

Indie bonus CD
No.	Title	Length
1.	"The Fury" (The Negation)	4:15
2.	"Three-Dimensional Defect" (The Negation)	4:11
3.	"Lying and Weak" (The Negation)	3:41
4.	"Winds of Creation" (Winds of Creation)	4:32
5.	"Nihility" (Nihility)	4:28
6.	"The Negation" (The Negation)	5:07
7.	"Perfect Dehumanization" (Nihility)	4:43
8.	"Sensual Sickness" (The Negation)	4:10
9.	"Spheres of Madness" (Nihility)	5:02
10.	"Mother War" (Nihility)	4:04
Total length:		44:13

== Personnel ==
=== Decapitated ===
- Wacław "Vogg" Kiełtyka – guitars
- Witold "Vitek" Kiełtyka – drums
- Adrian "Covan" Kowanek – vocals
- Marcin "Martin" Rygiel – bass

=== Production ===
- Decapitated – production
- Sławek and Wojtek Wiesławski – engineering (at Hertz Studio, Białystok, Poland, August 2005)
- Spiros Antoniou – front cover and design
- Jacek Wisniewski – layout
- Marta Filewicz, Kastor, ARS, Tim from Boston – lyrics revision and consultation

== Release history ==
Formats	Region/Country	Date	Label	Notes
CD, 2 CD, DualDisc, LP, digital download	United States	7 February 2006	Earache Records	
CD, 2 CD, DualDisc, LP, digital download	UK, Europe	13 February 2006	Earache Records	
CD, 2 CD, DualDisc, LP, digital download	UK	13 February 2006	Earache Records	bonus CD in UK indie shops
CD, 2 CD, DualDisc, LP, digital download	UK, Europe	20 February 2006	Earache Records	Ltd Edition Dual Disc CD/DVD
CD, 2 CD, DualDisc, LP, digital download	Japan	22 February 2006	Teichiku Records	incl. two bonus tracks
CD, 2 CD, DualDisc, LP, digital download	Russia	2006	Earache Records/Soyuz Music	
CD, 2 CD, DualDisc, LP, digital download	Europe	26 July 2010	Earache Records	Limited Vinyl LP
