= Kołysanki =

Studio album by Lux Occulta
- Released: March 13, 2014
- Recorded: 2011–2013 at T'n'T Music Production
- Genre: Electronic rock, free jazz, experimental rock, avant-garde metal, spoken word
- Length: 54:07
- Language: Polish, French
- Label: Trzecie Ucho
- Producer: Maciej Tomczyk

Lux Occulta chronology
The Mother and the Enemy (2001)	Kołysanki (2014)

Professional ratings
Review scores
Source	Rating
Axis of Metal	8/10 stars
The Metal Foundry	5/5 stars
Metal Storm	Positive

Kołysanki (Polish for "Lullabies") is the fifth studio album by Polish band Lux Occulta. The album was released on March 13, 2014. It is the first album released by the band in 13 years, as well as the first since the ending of the band's hiatus, making it the longest gap between the band's albums.

== Sound ==
Kołysanki marks a drastic departure of the band's previous black metal sound in favor of a more experimental electronic rock sound. A reviewer for the webzine Metal Storm described the album's opening track, "Dymy", as having a "heavy synth atmosphere, with very groovy beats and rhythms and vocals that dance between charismatic singing and interesting spoken word." He also praised the song "Samuel wraca do domu" for its "use of sax, double bass, and organ, that sounds more like a jazz piece from the early 1900s than anything else", as well as the song "Karawanem Fiat" for taking a "neoclassical approach with acoustic guitar work that would delight even the most seasoned of flamenco listeners." Thomas Bawden of Axis of Metal described the album as a "musical mindfuck", which feature "track titles in Polish and then prominently featuring electronically sampled French vocal lines", "violin melodies that could almost be described as neo-classical if they weren’t so dissonant, frequently set to a bombastic industrial backing beat", and "psychedelic guitar lines meandering back and forth amidst a nightmarish flurry of almost gypsy folk-inspired accordion lines", as well as jazz melodies that "lend the piece the atmosphere of a 1930s smoke-filled club."

== Track listing ==
All lyrics written by Jarosław Szubrycht. All music composed by Jerzy Głód, except "Karawanem Fiat" composed by Jerzy Głód, Grzegorz Kapłon, and Piotr Szczurek.

No.	Title	Translation	Length
1.	"Dymy"	Fumes	7:55
2.	"Samuel wraca do domu"	Samuel Is Returning Home	6:29
3.	"Mieczów siedem"	Seven Swords	5:34
4.	"Serca tu mają tylko dzwony"	Only The Bells Have Hearts Here (Note: Serce dzwonu, literally "bell heart", is Polish for clapper.)	4:56
5.	"Sen jest lżejszy od powietrza" (Instrumental)	Dream Is Lighter Than Air	5:38
6.	"Karawanem Fiat"	Fiat Hearse	8:27
7.	"Bieluń i chryzantemy"	Datura and Chrysanthemums	7:18
8.	"Bądź miłościw" (Instrumental)	Be Merciful	7:50
Total length:			54:07

== Personnel ==
Lux Occulta

- Jarosław Szubrycht – lead vocals, lyrical concept, visual concept
- Jerzy Głód – keyboards, backing vocals, musical concept, mixing, production
- Wacław Kiełtyka – lead guitar, accordion
- Maciek Tomczyk – rhythm guitar, acoustic guitar

Additional musicians

- Julia Doszna – vocals
- Julie Cazalas – vocals
- Catherine Fornal – vocals
- Łukasz Madej – double bass
- Wojtek Krzak – violin
- Władysław Grochot – trumpet
- Tomasz Grochot – cajón
- Marek Tomczyk – classical guitar, mixing, mastering

Production

- Elżbieta Biryło – cover art
- Łukasz Jaszak – graphic design
- Igor Szubrycht – writing
