= The Negation =

- Cover art by Jacek Wiśniewski

Studio album by Decapitated
- Released: 9 March 2004
- Recorded: August 2003 – September 2003, Hertz Studio, Białystok, Poland
- Genre: Technical death metal
- Length: 32:50
- Label: Earache
- Producer: Sławek Wiesławski, Wojtek Wiesławski, Decapitated

Decapitated chronology
Nihility (2002)	The Negation (2004)	Organic Hallucinosis (2006)

The Negation is the third studio album by Polish death metal band Decapitated. It was released on 9 March 2004, through Earache Records.

It is Decapitated's final album to feature vocalist Wojciech "Sauron" Wąsowicz.

== Critical reception ==
Professional ratings
Review scores
Source	Rating
AllMusic	3.5/5 stars
Kerrang!	5/5 stars
Exclaim!	favorable
Teraz Rock	3.5/5 stars

After its release, The Negation received mixed reviews from music critics. William York of AllMusic praised the production saying [...] is far better than on most of the big-name death metal albums released in the early 2000s. It's clear and full sounding, yet without being overly slick or digitally sanitized." While Jill Mikkelson of Exclaim! praised songwriting "All ten songs are delivered with debilitating momentum and quirky time changes, humiliating most contemporary metal outfits. Slower grooves paired with bludgeoning drumming create a crisp but exceptionally intense sound that has developed into their own."

== Track listing ==
All lyrics are written by Sauron, except where noted; all music is composed by Decapitated.

No.	Title	Length
1.	"The Fury"	4:26
2.	"Three-Dimensional Defect"	3:57
3.	"Lying and Weak"	3:25
4.	"Sensual Sickness"	4:05
5.	"The Calling" (Instrumental)	1:17
6.	"The Negation"	5:04
7.	"Long-Desired Dementia"	3:21
8.	"The Empty Throne"	4:41
9.	"Lunatic of God's Creation" (Bonus track; Deicide cover)	2:34
Total length:		32:50

== Personnel ==
=== Decapitated ===
- Wojciech "Sauron" Wąsowicz – vocals
- Wacław Kiełtyka – guitars
- Marcin "Martin" Rygiel – bass
- Witold Kiełtyka – drums

=== Production ===
- Sławek and Wojtek Wiesławski – production
- Decapitated – production
- Jacek Wiśniewski – cover art
- Darek Kempny – photography
