= Lux Occulta =

Polish avant-garde metal band

- Origin: Dukla, Poland
- Genres: Avant-garde metal, progressive metal, experimental rock, symphonic black metal (early), art rock (later)
- Years active: 1994–2002, 2011–present
- Label: Maquiavel Music Entertainment
- Members: Jarosław Szubrycht; Jerzy Głód; Wacław Kiełtyka; Maciej Tomczyk

Lux Occulta (Latin for "hidden light" or "the secrets of light") is a Polish avant-garde metal band founded in late 1994. Their work, influenced by progressive metal and black metal, incorporates elaborate arrangements, often featuring multiple sections and unpredictable time changes.

== Biography ==
The band started when guitarists Peter and G'Ames, formerly of Blaspherion, asked Jaro.Slav, vocalist of Haemorrhage, to join their new project. Jackie (bass guitar) and Aemil (drums) joined the band a few weeks later, followed by keyboard player U'reck after the band's first rehearsal session. After recording the band's first album, Forever Alone, Immortal, in 1996, Aemil was replaced with drummer Kriss. The band's second album, Dionysos, followed in 1997. In 1998, after the release of Maior Arcana, G'Ames and Jackie left the band and were replaced with guitarist Vogg and bassist Martin, of Polish death metal band Decapitated. They released My Guardian Anger in 1999. In the latter half of 1999, Kriss suffered from a broken arm, leading doctors to question whether he would be able to play drums again, and U'reck broke his leg shortly thereafter. The band retired from touring for several months, after which they played Poland's Metalmania festival in 2000, alongside Opeth, Behemoth and Tiamat. The next month, Portuguese label Maquiavel Music Entertainment signed them to a two-album deal. They released their first album on MME, The Mother and the Enemy, the following year. The band has been inactive since 2002. In 2012, they posted a message to their MySpace indicating that they were working on new material and looking for a new drummer. In 2014, they released Kołysanki, which departed from their previous avant garde/black metal sound.

== Band members ==
Current members

- Jarosław "Jaro.Slav" Szubrycht – vocals (1994–2002, 2011–present)
- Jerzy "U.Reck" Głód – keyboards (1994–2002, 2011–present)
- Wacław "Vogg" Kiełtyka – lead guitar (1998–2002, 2011–present)
- Maciek Tomczyk – rhythm guitar (2012–present)

Former members

- "Aemil" – drums (1994–1996)
- Grzegorz "G. Ames" Kapłon – lead guitar (1994–1998)
- "Jackie" – bass (1994–1998)
- Piotr "Peter" Szczurek – rhythm guitar (1994–2001)
- Krzysztof "Kriss" Szantula – drums (1996–2001)
- Marcin "Martin" Rygiel – bass (1998–2002)
- Rafał "Kastor" Kastory – rhythm guitar (2001–2002)

== Discography ==
=== Studio albums ===
- Forever Alone, Immortal (1996)
- Dionysos (1997)
- My Guardian Anger (1999)
- The Mother and the Enemy (2001)
- Kołysanki (2014)

=== Compilation albums ===
- Maior Arcana: The Words That Turn Flesh into Light (1998)

=== Demos ===
- The Forgotten Arts (1995)
