= Armageddon's Evolution =

Studio album by Crionics
- Released: October 25, 2004
- Recorded: July 17, 2004; Hertz Studio
- Genre: Blackened death metal
- Length: 57:37
- Labels: Candlelight; Empire
- Producer: Self-released

Crionics chronology
Human Error: Ways to Selfdestruction (2002)	Armageddon's Evolution (2004)	Neuthrone (2007)

Professional ratings
Review scores
Source	Rating
Allmusic	3/5 stars

Armageddon's Evolution is the second full-length album by the blackened death metal band Crionics. It was released under Candlelight Records and Empire Records in 2005. They recorded the album at Hertz Studio and was mastered by the Wiesławscy brothers.

Norway's Exact gave the album a 6 out of 6 score. It left the reviewer "close to speechless", and though the Poles were "half-mad" they managed to play a "perfect concoction" in the Emperor vein.

== Track listing ==
1. "Arrival of Non-parallel Aeons" - 4:38
2. "Final Inversion" - 3:17
3. "Armageddon's Evolution" - 4:42
4. "Chant of Rebel Angels (intro)" - 1:47
5. "FFF (Freezing Fields of InFinity)" - 4:50
6. "Xenomorphized Soul Devoured" - 5:27
7. "Disconnected Minds" - 5:31
8. "Celestial Interference" - 5:56
9. "Dept. 666" ft. Adrian "Covan" Kowanek (bonus track) - 7:07
10. "Black Manifest (The Sermon to the Masses)" - 4:19
11. "The Loss and Curse of Reverence" - 6:09 (Bonus, Emperor cover)
12. "Total Blasphemy - 3:54 (Bonus)

Total playing time 57:37

== Personnel ==
- Michał "War-A.N" Skotniczny - guitars, vocals
- Markus "Marcotic" Kopa - bass (left during recording session)
- Maciej "Darkside" Kowalski - drums
- Wacław "Vac-V" Borowiec - keymaster
