= Unbeliever's Script =

Studio album by Sceptic
- Released: 25 September 2003 (POL); 6 April 2004 (EU)
- Recorded: Hertz Studio, Białystok, Poland, July 2003
- Genre: Technical death metal
- Length: 47:31
- Label: Empire Records (POL), Candlelight Records (EU)
- Producer: Wojciech Wiesławski, Sławomir Wiesławski

Sceptic chronology
Pathetic Being (2001)	Unbeliever's Script (2003)	Internal Complexity (2005)

Professional ratings
Review scores
Source	Rating
Allmusic	3/5 stars
Chronicles of Chaos	8/10 stars

Unbeliever's Script is the third studio album by the Polish death metal band Sceptic. The album was released on 25 September 2003 by Empire Records.

== Track listing ==
No.	Title	Lyrics	Music	Length
1.	"Unbeliever's Script"	Marcin Urbaś	Sceptic	04:51
2.	"Illusion Possessor"	Marcin Urbaś	Sceptic	04:06
3.	"Controlled by Mind"	Marcin Urbaś	Sceptic	05:47
4.	"Soul Controllers"	Marcin Urbaś	Sceptic	05:46
5.	"Shapeless Entity"	Marcin Urbaś	Sceptic	06:07
6.	"Knowledge Gatherer"	Marcin Urbaś	Sceptic	04:18
7.	"Voices from the Past" (instrumental)		Sceptic	07:05
8.	"Spiritually Tormented"	Marcin Urbaś	Sceptic	05:12
9.	"Waves of Destruction"	Marcin Urbaś	Sceptic	04:19
Total length:				47:31

== Personnel ==
Sceptic

- Marcin Urbaś - vocals
- Grzegorz Feliks - bass guitar
- Jakub Chmura - drums
- Jacek Hiro - guitars

Production

- Wojciech Wiesławski, Sławomir Wiesławski - mixing, mastering, recording, producing
- Jacek Mrożek, Jacek Wiśniewski - cover art and layout
- Mariusz Kmiołek - photography

Notes

- Recorded, mixed and mastered at Hertz Studio, Białystok, Poland, July 2003
