= Human Error: Ways to Selfdestruction =

Studio album by Crionics
- Released: August 23, 2002
- Recorded: August 12–23, 2002; Hertz Studio
- Genre: Blackened death metal
- Length: 44:42
- Label: Candlelight; Empire
- Producer: Self-released

Crionics chronology
Beyond the Blazing Horizon (2000)	Human Error: Ways to Selfdestruction (2002)	Armageddon's Evolution (2005)

Professional ratings
Review scores
Source	Rating
Allmusic	2.5/5 stars

Human Error: Ways to Selfdestruction is the first full-length album by the blackened death metal band Crionics. It was released under Candlelight Records and recorded at Hertz Studio.

== Track listing ==
All songs were written by War-A.N, except where noted.

1. "Satanic Syndrome 666" – 3:51 (Vac-V, War-A.N)
2. "Waterfalls of Darkness" – 3:43 (Vac-V, War-A.N)
3. "Lunatic Gate" – 5:38 (Aryman, War-A.N)
4. "Hallowed Whores" – 4:13
5. "Crionics" – 3:46 (Vac-V, War-A.N)
6. "Episode of the Falling Star" – 5:04
7. "Matrix of Piety" – 4:08 (Vac-V, War-A.N)
8. "Precipice Gaped" – 4:21 (Bielewicz, War-A.N, Zieba)
9. "Sacrosanct Strength" – 3:44 (War-A.N, Zieba)
10. "Indoctrination Procedure" – 6:12

=== Notes ===
Bonus tracks:

- A bonus track Carpathian Forest was released worldwide; a cover from the Through Chasm, Caves and Titan Woods EP from the band Carpathian Forest.

== Personnel ==
- Michał "War-A.N" Skotniczny - guitar, vocals
- Wacław "Vac-V" Borowiec - keymaster, synthesizer
- Marcotic – bass
- Maciej "Darkside" Kowalski - drums
- Sławek & Wojtek Wiesławscy - engineering, mixing, mastering
- Jacek Wiśniewsk - cover, designs
