= Cancer Culture =

Studio album by Decapitated
- Released: 27 May 2022
- Studio: Fascination Street Studios, Örebro, Sweden. Studio Gröndahl, Stockholm, Sweden.
- Genre: Technical death metal, groove metal
- Length: 37:12
- Label: Nuclear Blast
- Producer: Ted Jensen

Decapitated chronology
Anticult (2017)	Cancer Culture (2022)

Singles from Cancer Culture
- 1. "Cancer Culture" Released: 18 March 2022; 2. "Hello Death" Released: 8 April 2022; 3. "Just a Cigarette" Released: 13 May 2022

Cancer Culture is the eighth studio album by Polish death metal band Decapitated. It was released on 27 May 2022 by Nuclear Blast. The band announced the album on March 17, 2022, and also released its title track. They also revealed the album would feature guest performances from members of Jinjer and Machine Head. It is the band's first album to feature drummer James Stewart, and their last to feature singer Rafał "Rasta" Piotrowski before departing the band in October 2024.

Professional ratings
Review scores
Source	Rating
BlabberMouth	9/10 stars
Distorted Sound Magazine	9/10 stars

== Track listing ==
All lyrics are written by Jarek Szubrycht.

No.	Title	Length
1.	"From the Nothingness with Love"	1:16
2.	"Cancer Culture"	4:08
3.	"Just a Cigarette"	3:57
4.	"No Cure"	3:26
5.	"Hello Death" (feat. Tatiana Shmailyuk of Jinjer)	4:54
6.	"Iconoclast" (feat. Robb Flynn of Machine Head)	4:49
7.	"Suicidal Space Programme"	4:58
8.	"Locked"	1:16
9.	"Hours as Battlegrounds"	3:58
10.	"Last Supper"	4:22
Total length:		37:12

== Personnel ==
Decapitated

- Rafał "Rasta" Piotrowski – vocals
- Wacław "Vogg" Kiełtyka – guitars, bass
- James Stewart – drums

Production

- Ted Jensen – production
- Fabio Timpanaro - cover art
- Jarek Szubrycht - lyrics
- Tomasz Zed Zalewski - engineering
- David Castillo - mixing

== Charts ==
Chart (2022)	Peak position
Polish Albums (ZPAV)	4
US Heatseekers Albums (Billboard)	23
