= Neuthrone =

Studio album by Crionics
- Released: July 16, 2007
- Recorded: October 2006; Zed Studio, Olkusz
- Genre: Blackened death metal
- Length: 43:39
- Label: Candlelight; Mystic Production
- Producer: Tomasz Zalewski

Crionics chronology
Armageddon's Evolution (2004)	Neuthrone (2007)

Professional ratings
Review scores
Source	Rating
Allmusic	3.5/5 stars

Neuthrone is the third full-length album by the Polish blackened death metal band Crionics. The album was originally released under Candlelight Records, but it was also released under Mystic Production. The album was released as an enhanced audio disc with a video of Humanmeat Cargo and bonus track Black Warriors and was recorded at Zed Studio 2006 till 2007 and was produced, engineered and mastered by Tomasz Zalewski who also recorded the last albums of Thy Disease, Totem, Horrorscope and many others.

The video clip was recorded by Besz Film in Gliwice, Poland. After working on the video clip for 6 days, War-A.N. comments:

Working on the video was quite hard and very intensive, but we all had good time also.I think the final effect is original and interesting. That's because we tried to do it unconventional, in a different way than most of metal videos are made. We have a lot of film material that we naturally weren't able to use it during almost 4 minutes of this track but it is quite good to be used in other project. Mastermind of "Besz Film" - talented and rewarded many times - Beniamin Szwed - was so impressed with the stuff we shot so he decided to make short film to be presented at independent film festivals.

— War-A.N., Crionics

The album is a concept album describing apocalyptic events where an ancient extraterrestrial civilization known as the "Rye’eh-X’D’aah" ransack the Earth, enslave, and transform humanity.

From the album liner notes:

Crionics - Neuthrone - Introduction

"Thousands of years before Christ, the extraterrestrial civilization of Rye’eh-X’D’aah – the Demiurgs who since the beginning of time had been wandering in search of the Harbour (the optimal climate conditions and resources to enable their Great System to function most efficiently) one day encountered Mother Earth. Unfortunately, the atmosphere and lack of technology (neutron-climate control and extermination technology was still being developed) made it impossible to take control of the planet and settle on it. The Rye’eh-X’D’yh devised a lengthy but effective and safe solution to the problem. After series of tests and experiments, Leaders’ Council selected a few hundred of the best-developed, healthiest specimens of both sexes of Homo sapiens. They were taken along on the next part of the voyage, most of which they spent in cryogenic chambers, being reproduced, experimented on and modified genetically, so that their new fathers could raise a new species, the Homo superior, a doomsday device in the hands of the Demiurgs..."

== Track listing ==
1. "Introduction" - 1:19
2. "New Pantheon" - 3:36
3. "Arrival 2033" - 3:09
4. "Neu.Throne.Aeon" - 4:29
5. "Superiors" - 4:06
6. "Hell Earth" - 2:57
7. "Humanmeat Cargo" - 3:39
8. "Outer Empire" - 4:58
9. "Frozen Hope" - 5:40
10. "When The Sun Goes Out..." - 4:52
11. "Black Warriors" (Bonus track) - 4:51

== Notes ==
1. An enhanced audio disc with a video of Humanmeat Cargo was included.
2. The bonus track Black Warriors is a re-recording of the '98 demo track.

== Personnel ==
Band members

- Michał "War-A.N" Skotniczny - lead vocals, rhythm guitar
- Dariusz "Yanuary" Styczeń - bass, backing vocals
- Wacław "Vac-V" Borowiec - keyboards, electronics, backing vocals
- Maciej "Darkside" Kowalski - drums, percussions

Production personnel

- Tomasz Zalewski - engineering, mastering
- Michał "Czecza" Czekaj - photo shoot, cover art, designs

== Release dates ==
Release dates are confirmed by their website.

July 16, 2007	July 23, 2007	July 31, 2007
EU (excl. PL)	PL	US
