= Pathetic Being =

Studio album by Sceptic
- Released: 21 April 2001 (POL); 15 May 2001 (EU); 25 September 2001 (US)
- Recorded: Selani Studio, Olsztyn, Poland, September 2000
- Genre: Technical death metal
- Length: 46:12
- Label: Empire Records (POL), Last Episode (EU), Crash Music (US)
- Producer: Szymon Czech

Sceptic chronology
| Blind Existence (1999) | Pathetic Being (2001) | Unbeliever's Script (2003) |

Professional ratings
Review scores
| Source | Rating |
|---|---|
| Allmusic | 4/5 stars |
| Chronicles of Chaos | 8/10 stars |

Pathetic Being is the second studio album by the Polish death metal band Sceptic. It was released on 21 April 2001 by Empire Records.

== Track listing ==
| No. | Title | Lyrics | Music | Length |
|---|---|---|---|---|
| 1. | "Intro" (instrumental) | | Sceptic | 1:14 |
| 2. | "Ancient Portal" | Marcin Urbaś | Sceptic | 5:43 |
| 3. | "Pathetic Being" | Marcin Urbaś | Sceptic | 4:03 |
| 4. | "Only Lies" | Marcin Urbaś | Sceptic | 6:07 |
| 5. | "Ancestor of All Powers" | Marcin Urbaś | Sceptic | 5:35 |
| 6. | "Incapable Rulers" | Marcin Urbaś | Sceptic | 4:56 |
| 7. | "Lost Identity" | Jacek Hiro, Marcin Urbaś | Sceptic | 3:39 |
| 8. | "Arctic Crypt" (Nocturnus cover) | Louis Panzer | Nocturnus | 4:39 |
| 9. | "Particles of Time" (instrumental) | | Sceptic | 5:15 |
| 10. | "Children's Eyes" | Marcin Urbaś | Sceptic | 5:01 |
| Total length: | | | | 46:12 |

== Personnel ==
Sceptic

- Michał Senajko - vocals
- Jacek Hiro - guitars
- Czesiek Semla - guitars
- Paweł Kolasa - bass guitar
- Maciek Zięba - drums

Production

- Szymon Czech - production, sound engineering
- Adam Kuc - mastering
- Jacek Wiśniewski - cover art and layout
- Piotr Górka - photography

Notes

- Recorded and mixed at Selani Studio, Olsztyn, September 2000.
- Mastered at Selani Studio, Olsztyn, October 2000.
