= Beyond the Blazing Horizon =

EP by Crionics
- Released: February 2000
- Recorded: 1999–2000; Bartsound Studio
- Genre: Blackened death metal
- Length: 19:26
- Label: Demonic
- Producer: Self-released

Crionics chronology
Demo 98 (1998)	Beyond the Blazing Horizon (2000)	Human Error: Ways to Selfdestruction (2002)

Alternative Cover
- Self-released 2000 re-issue.

'Beyond the Blazing Horizon' is the first full EP by the Polish blackened death metal band Crionics.

== Track listing ==
1. "Thus The Stars Were Falling (Intro)" – 1:07
2. "Episode of the Falling Star" – 4:40
3. "Fireland" – 3:36
4. "Waterfalls of Darkness" – 3:48
5. "There Was Neither Ground Nor Firmament (Precipice Gaped)" – 4:15
6. "Beyond the Blazing Horizon (Outro)" – 1:56

Total playing time 19:26

=== Bonus tracks ===
- Mystic Past
- Pagan Strength
- Black Warriors
- I am the Black Wizards (Emperor cover)

== Personnel ==
- Michał "War-A.N" Skotniczny – guitar, vocals
- Wacław "Vac-V" Borowiec – keyboards, synthesizers
- Maciej "Carol" Zięba – drums
- Bartosz "Bielmo" Bielewicz – guitar
- Marcotic – bass
- B. Bielewicz & G. Sznyterman – engineering, mixing, mastering
