= Forever Alone, Immortal =

Forever Alone. Immortal

Studio album by Lux Occulta
- Released: September 9, 1996
- Recorded: March–April 1996
- Studio: Manek Studio
- Genre: Black metal
- Length: 57:15
- Label: Pagan Records
- Producer: Lux Occulta, Mariusz Kurasz

Lux Occulta chronology
The Forgotten Arts (demo) (1995)	Forever Alone. Immortal (1996)	Dionysos (1997)

Forever Alone. Immortal is the debut studio album by the Polish occult black metal band Lux Occulta. The 2001 re-release of the album by Metal Mind includes the Sisters of Mercy cover "Burn” as a bonus track; it can also be found on the compilation Maior Arcana.

== Track listing ==
- Lyrics By Jaro.Slav; Music By Lux Occulta.
1. The Kingdom Is Mine (I Saw the Beginning) (6:49)
2. Homodeus (Throne of Fire) (11:39)
3. Sweetest Stench of the Dead (The Battlefield) (11:52)
4. The Third Eye (Illuminatio) (9:37)
5. Apokathastasis (Out of Chaos) (7:26)
6. Bitter Taste of Victory (8:42)

== Personnel ==
- Jaro.Slav: Vocals
- G'Ames, Peter: Guitars
- Damian Kurasz: Guest Lead Guitar On Track 2
- U.Reck: Keyboards & Acoustic Guitar
- Ewa Pogwizd: Cello
- Barbara Pizun: Flute, Vocals
- Jackie: Bass
- Aemil: Drums, Percussion

== Production ==
- Executive Producer: Pagan Records
- Produced By Lux Occulta & Mariusz Kurasz
- Engineered, Mixed & Mastered By Andrzej Rdultowski
