= The Mother and the Enemy =

Studio album by Lux Occulta
- Released: November 19, 2001
- Genre: Avant-garde metal, symphonic black metal, jazz with spoken world and electronic elements
- Length: 53:51
- Label: Metal Mind Productions, Maquiavel Music Ent.
- Producer: Bartłomiej Kuźniak, Lux Occulta

Lux Occulta chronology
My Guardian Anger (1999)	The Mother and the Enemy (2001)	Kołysanki (2014)

Professional ratings
Review scores
Source	Rating
Chronicles of Chaos	8.5/10 stars
Noise.fi	3/5

The Mother and the Enemy is the fourth studio album by the Polish symphonic black metal group Lux Occulta. It expands upon the band's signature sound by incorporating influences from a variety of styles, including free jazz, trip hop, death metal, industrial music, electronica, and spoken word.

== Track listing ==
1. "Breathe In" – 0:54
2. "Mother Pandora" – 5:46
3. "Architecture" – 5:53
4. "Most Arrogant Life Form" – 3:50
5. "Yet Another Armageddon" – 3:28
6. "Gambit" – 6:12
7. "Midnight Crisis" – 6:34
8. "Pied Piper" – 9:15
9. "Missa Solemnis" – 7:44
10. "Breathe Out" – 4:11
