= Blindead =

Polish metal band

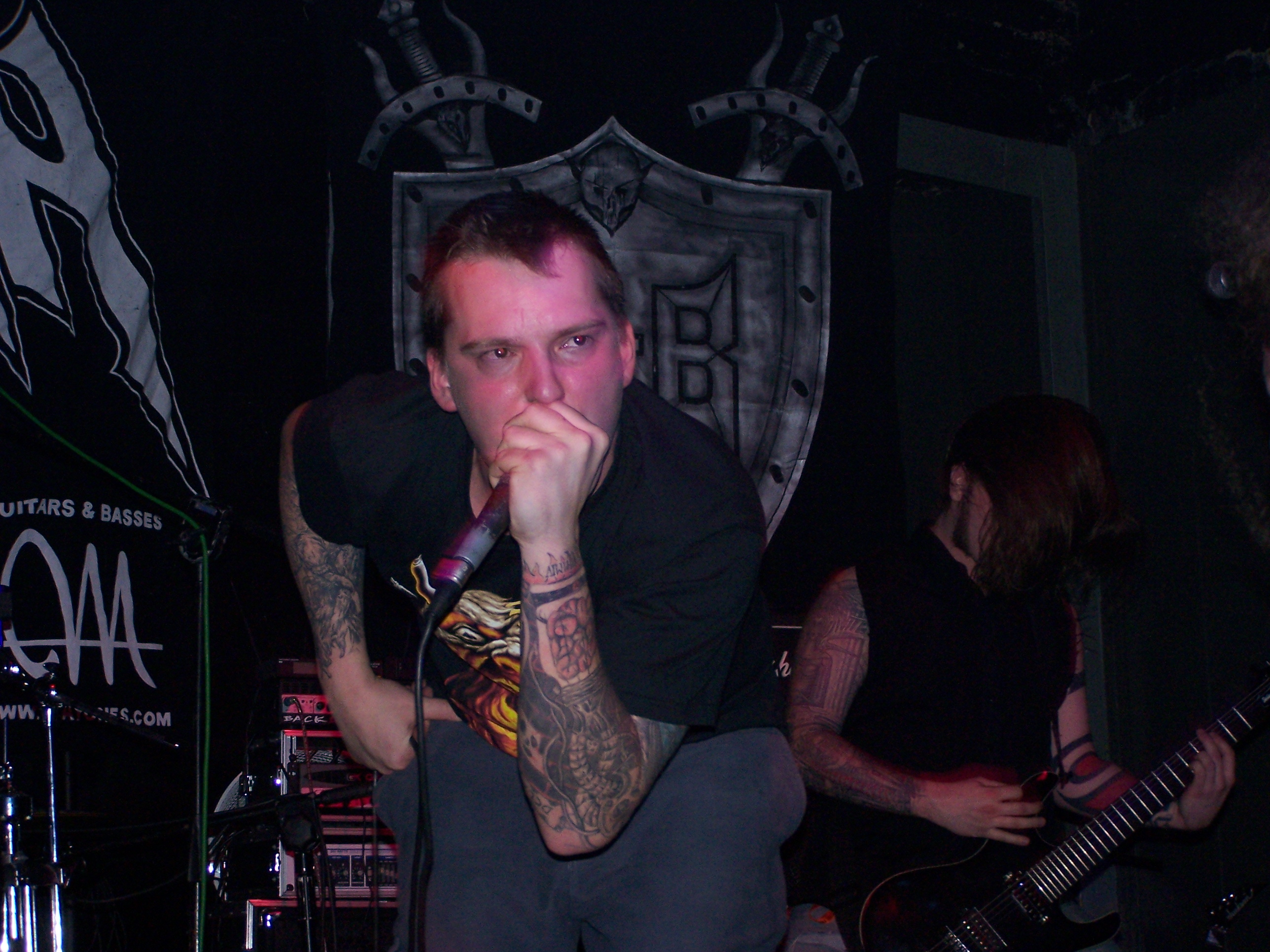
- Blindead, 2006

Background information
- Origin: Gdynia, Poland
- Genres: Sludge metal, doom metal, progressive metal, post-metal
- Years active: 1999–2019
- Labels: Empire Records, Deadline Records, Mystic Production
- Members: Mateusz Śmierzchalski; Konrad Ciesielski; Bartosz Hervy; Matteo Bassoli
- Past members: Michał Zimorski; Rafał Brauer; Piotr Kawalerowski; Patryk Adamczyk; Patryk Zwoliński; Marek Zieliński

Blindead is a Polish progressive extreme metal band from Gdynia, formed in 1999 under the name Incorrect Personality.

In 2011, the band was nominated for a Fryderyk Award in the category 'Album of the Year – Heavy Metal'.

== Band members ==
Current members

- Mateusz Śmierzchalski – guitars (1999–present)
- Konrad Ciesielski – drums (1999–present)
- Bartosz Hervy – keyboards (2007–present)
- Matteo Bassoli – bass (2012–present)

Former members

- Michał Zimorski – bass (1999–2004)
- Marek Zieliński – guitars (1999–2018)
- Rafał Brauer – bass (2004–2006)
- Piotr Kawalerowski – bass (2006–2012)
- Patryk Adamczyk – vocals (1999–2002)
- Patryk Zwoliński – vocals (2002–2015)
- Jan Galbas – vocals, guitars (2015)
- Piotr Pieza – vocals (2016-2018)

== Discography ==
=== Studio albums ===
Title	Album details	Peak chart positions
Title	Album details	POL
Devouring Weakness	Released: 5 July 2006; Label: Empire Records	—
Autoscopia / Murder in Phazes	Released: 18 August 2008; Label: Deadline Records	—
Affliction XXIX II MXMVI	Released: 26 November 2010; Label: Mystic Production	—
Absence	Released: 14 October 2013; Label: Mystic Production	32
Ascension	Released: 21 October 2016; Label: Mystic Production	—
"—" denotes a recording that did not chart.

=== Extended plays ===
Title	Album details
Impulse	Released: 17 April 2009; Label: Lou & Rocked Boys/Foreshadow

=== Music videos ===
Title	Year	Director
"Affliction XXV II MMIX"	2011	Roman Przylipiak
