= Nihility =

- Cover art by Jacek Wiśniewski

Studio album by Decapitated
- Released: 19 February 2002
- Recorded: October 2001, Hertz Studio, Białystok, Poland
- Genre: Technical death metal
- Length: 39:39
- Label: Earache
- Producer: Decapitated

Decapitated chronology
| Winds of Creation (2000) | Nihility (2002) | The Negation (2004) |

Nihility is the second studio album by Polish death metal band Decapitated. It was released on 19 February 2002 through Earache Records.

The German edition was issued in a green casing and contains a cover of the Napalm Death song "Suffer the Children".

== Critical reception ==
Professional ratings
Review scores
| Source | Rating |
|---|---|
| AllMusic | 4/5 stars |
| Brave Words | 7.5/10 stars |
| Kerrang! | 5/5 stars |
| Exclaim! | favorable |

After its release, Nihility received mostly positive reviews from music critics. Jason D. Taylor of AllMusic said "The vocals sound less homo sapien and more like demonic hellspawn, which intertwines with the exquisite death metal opera being performed by the rest of the band. The drumming here is relentless, pounding its way into the skull with furious determination." While Chris Bruni of Brave Words noted that the album "Musically it's tighter, the playing a bit more technical, yet not as technical as fellow country-deathsters Yattering, but still calculated, with a constant brutal flow. And it is the overall production - a tight clean openly heavy sound - that gives Nihility that "classic feel," a sound which is a cool mix of the classic Florida vibe bled with the classic Stockholm sound." Greg Pratt of Exclaim! praised the songwriting and Witold "Vitek" Kiełtyka skills: "The riffs show a nice element of groove within the grindcore madness, and the drumming is absolutely stunning; the double-bass work alone is worth the cost of the disc."

== Track listing ==
All lyrics are written by Sauron, except where noted; all music is composed by Decapitated.

| No. | Title | Length |
|---|---|---|
| 1. | "Perfect Dehumanisation (The Answer?)" | 5:25 |
| 2. | "Eternity Too Short" | 4:32 |
| 3. | "Mother War" | 4:08 |
| 4. | "Nihility (Anti-Human Manifesto)" | 4:59 |
| 5. | "Names" | 3:52 |
| 6. | "Spheres of Madness" | 5:14 |
| 7. | "Babylon's Pride" | 4:15 |
| 8. | "Symmetry of Zero" | 2:36 |
| 9. | "Suffer the Children" (German edition only; Napalm Death cover) | 4:39 |

== Personnel ==
=== Decapitated ===
- Wojciech "Sauron" Wąsowicz – vocals
- Wacław "Vogg" Kiełtyka – guitars
- Marcin "Martin" Rygiel – bass
- Witold "Vitek" Kiełtyka – drums

=== Production ===
- Wojtek and Sławek Wiesławscy – production, mixing, mastering, recording
- Jacek Wiśniewski – cover art
