= Witold Kiełtyka =

Polish drummer (1984–2007)

Witold "Vitek" Kiełtyka
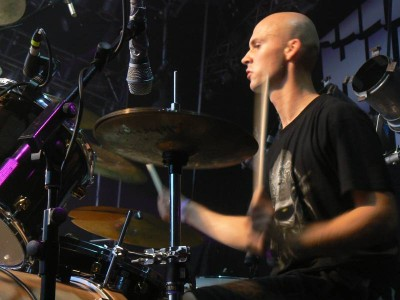
- Kiełtyka in 2006

Background information
- Born: 24 January 1984; Krosno, Poland
- Died: 2 November 2007 (aged 23); Novozybkov, Russia
- Occupation: Drummer
- Formerly of: Decapitated

Witold "Vitek" Kiełtyka (24 January 1984 – 2 November 2007) was a Polish musician, best known as the drummer and percussionist for the death metal band Decapitated. He had been with the band since its inception in 1996, when he was only twelve years old. Kiełtyka also worked with the death metal bands Dies Irae and Panzer X. He used Pearl drums, Remo drumheads and Alchemy cymbals.

He was the younger brother of guitarist Wacław "Vogg" Kiełtyka.

== Death and tributes ==
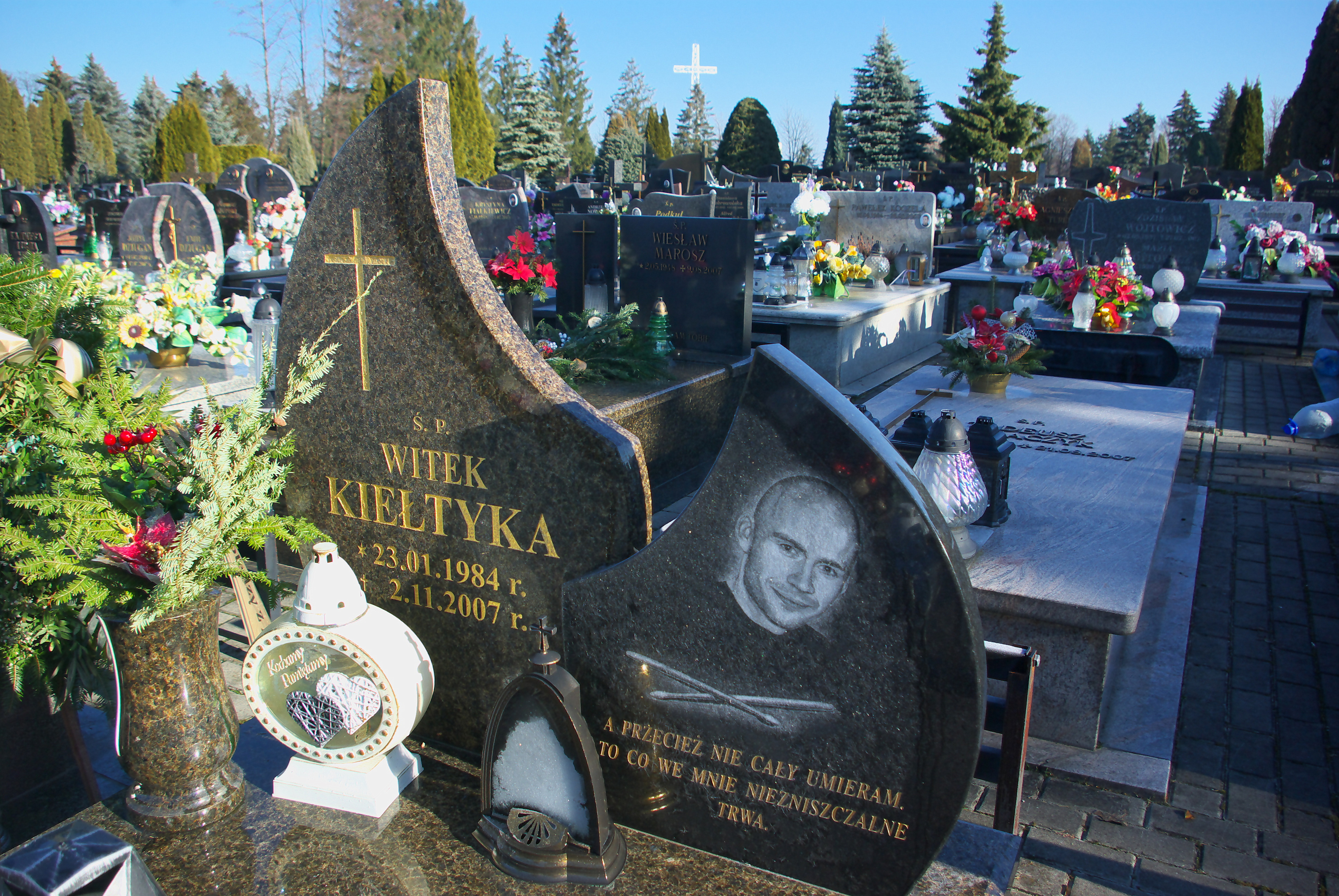
Grave of Kiełtyka in Krosno

On 29 October 2007, while travelling to a show in Gomel, the bus carrying Decapitated and Crionics collided with a truck carrying wood, causing serious head injuries to both Kiełtyka and Adrian Kowanek. The two were taken to a hospital in Novozybkov. While Kiełtyka's family released a statement saying that his condition had improved, he underwent trepanation and was due to be transported to a hospital in Kraków for further treatment. Kiełtyka died on 2 November 2007 at the age of 23.

Norwegian black metal band Dimmu Borgir played a tribute concert to him on 2 November 2007 at Oulu, Finland. Polish band Virgin Snatch composed the song "It's Time" dedicated to the drummer.

== Discography ==
- (1997) Decapitated – Cemeteral Gardens (demo)
- (1998) Decapitated – The Eye of Horus (demo)
- (2000) Decapitated – Winds of Creation (Wicked World/Earache Records)
- (2000) Decapitated – The First Damned (Metal Mind Productions)
- (2002) Decapitated – Nihility (Earache Records)
- (2004) Decapitated – The Negation (Earache Records)
- (2006) Panzer X – Steel Fist (Metal Mind Productions)
- (2006) Decapitated – Organic Hallucinosis (Earache Records)

Posthumous releases

- (2008) Decapitated – Human's Dust (DVD)
- (2009) Dies Irae – The Art of an Endless Creation (DVD)
