= Decapitated (band) =

Polish death metal band

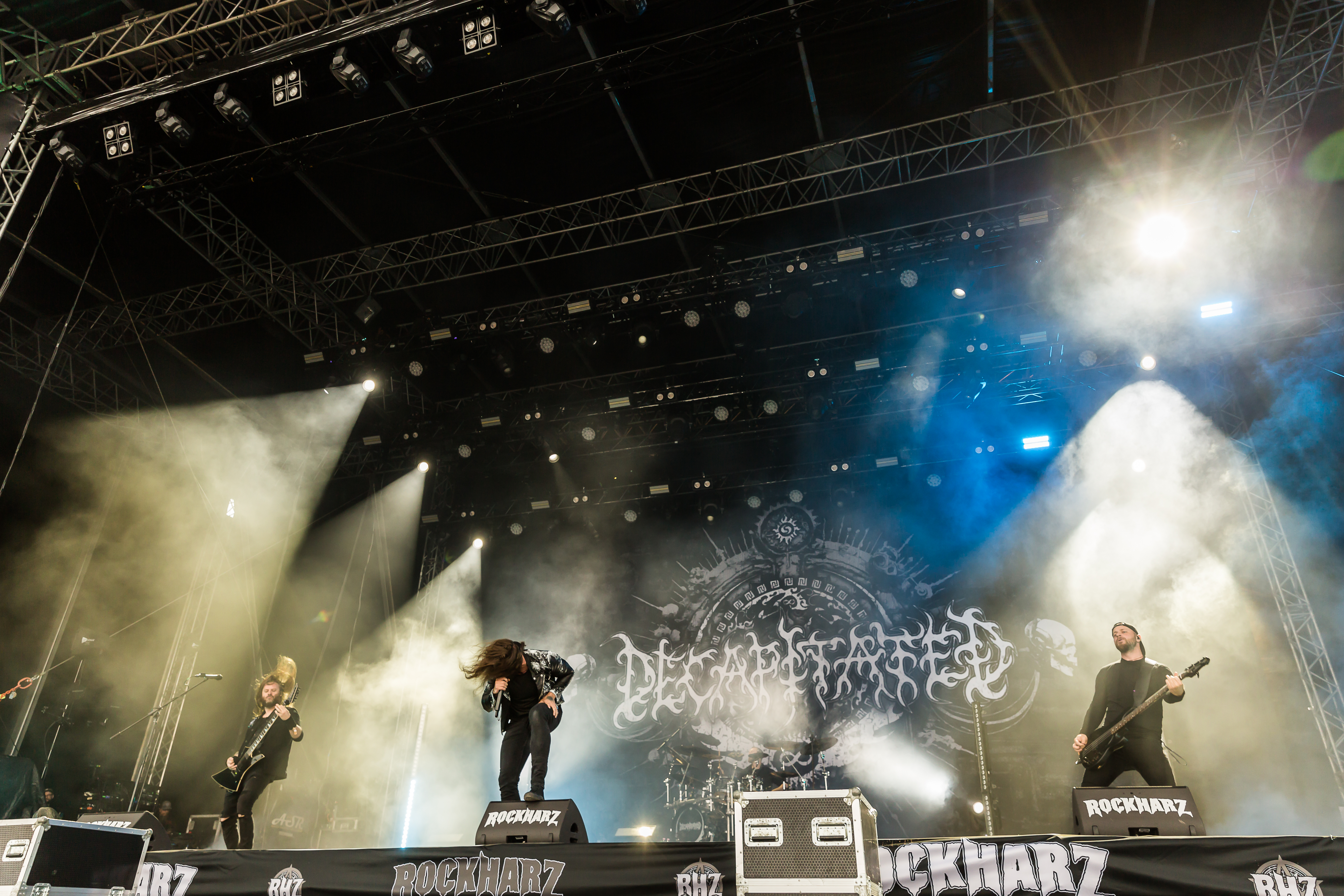
- Decapitated at Rockharz 2026

Background information
- Origin: Krosno, Poland
- Genres: Technical death metal; groove metal
- Years active: 1996–2007; 2009–present
- Labels: Earache; Nuclear Blast; Metal Mind; Riffs Factory; Mystic
- Members: Wacław Kiełtyka; Paweł Pasek; James Stewart; Eemeli Bodde
- Past members: Witold Kiełtyka; Marcin Rygiel; Wojciech Wąsowicz; Adrian Kowanek; Rafał Piotrowski; Filip Hałucha; Kerim Lechner; Michał Łysejko; Hubert Więcek
- Website: www.decapitatedband.net

Decapitated is a Polish death metal band formed in Krosno in 1996. The group is composed of guitarist, founder and composer Wacław "Vogg" Kiełtyka, vocalist Eemeli Bodde, bassist Paweł Pasek and drummer James Stewart. Decapitated are recognized as one of death metal's most respected bands and one of the finest exponents of technical death metal. The band earned an international fan base in the underground music community and became an innovating act in the modern death metal genre.

Vogg and his younger brother, drummer Witold "Vitek" Kiełtyka, founded Decapitated with vocalist Wojciech "Sauron" Wąsowicz in their mid-teens. Bassist Marcin "Martin" Rygiel joined them a year later. After releasing two demos, the band signed with Wicked World (subsidiary of Earache Records) and released their debut album, Winds of Creation, in 2000. In 2002 and 2004, the band released the albums Nihility and The Negation, respectively. The band's fourth album, Organic Hallucinosis, was released in 2006 with vocalist Adrian "Covan" Kowanek, who had replaced Wąsowicz the year before.

In late 2007, the band was involved in an automobile accident. Vitek died at the age of 23 on November 2, 2007, from injuries he suffered in the accident. Covan survived but slipped into a coma as a result. After a period of disbandment, Vogg reformed Decapitated in 2009. The band has released four more studio albums since then: Carnival Is Forever (2011), Blood Mantra (2014), Anticult (2017) and Cancer Culture (2022). Alternative Press described Decapitated as remaining one of "death metal's elite" bands.

== History ==
=== Winds of Creation, Nihility and The Negation (1996–2004) ===
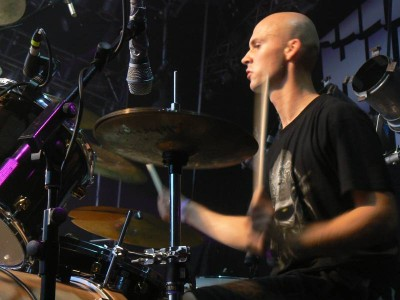
Vitek (pictured in 2006) was 15 years old during the recording sessions of Winds of Creation.

Decapitated was founded in Krosno, Poland in 1996, by guitarist Wacław "Vogg" Kiełtyka, who was 15 at the time, his brother drummer Witold "Vitek" Kiełtyka, who was 12 years old, and vocalist Wojciech "Sauron" Wąsowicz, who was 16. One year later, bassist Marcin "Martin" Rygiel, 13, joined the band. Decapitated released its first demo, Cemeterial Gardens, in 1997 and its second demo, The Eye of Horus, in 1998. After signing to Earache Records subsidiary Wicked World, the band released its debut album, Winds of Creation, which included a cover version of Slayer's "Mandatory Suicide", and was produced by Piotr Wiwczarek from the Polish band Vader, in April 2000. The band toured with Vader in early 2001 in the United Kingdom. Allmusic states that "Decapitated have quickly gained recognition as one of Poland's, and even Europe's, finest exponents of ultra-technical death metal."

Decapitated's self-produced second album, Nihility, which was released in February 2002, fulfilled the high expectations that followed the well-received debut album. Nihility also included a cover version of Napalm Death's "Suffer the Children". Decapitated was chosen to perform at the Polish Ozzfest event in late May and toured in North America and Europe in August. Sławek and Wojtek Wiesławscy produced the band's next album, The Negation, which was released in February 2004. The album received a positive response from critics and was followed by a tour in Europe and the United States throughout 2004.

=== Organic Hallucinosis, accident, Vitek's death and hiatus (2005–2008) ===
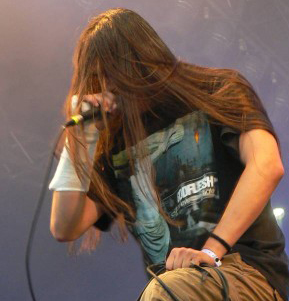
Covan in 2006

In mid-2005, Sauron announced his withdrawal from Decapitated, stating: "It was not an easy decision. However, I could reconcile the welfare of the band with my personal plans, and hence quitting appeared to be the best solution not hampering the evolution of Decapitated.(...) Moreover, another reason that contributed to my decision have been some health complications." The band chose Adrian "Covan" Kowanek, a previous member of Atrophia Red Sun, as his replacement and entered Hertz Studios in Białystok in August to record their ambitious fourth album Organic Hallucinosis, which was released the following February. According to Allmusic, the band's musical change of direction on this album was "likely to polarize longtime Decapitated fans".

During the following tour in December 2005, Marcin could not perform with the band due to military conscription issues and was shortly substituted by Richard Gulczynski, but joined again in February 2006. During the year, Decapitated toured with American bands Suffocation, Six Feet Under, Fear Factory, and others. In June and July 2007, Decapitated played with Cephalic Carnage and others in the Summer Slaughter trek across the US. Once the tour ended, Marcin departed from Decapitated to live with his family and to move to California.

On October 28, 2007, the remaining three band members were involved in an automobile accident that injured Vitek and Covan. Their tour bus collided with a truck carrying wood in Gomel, near the border from Russia to Belarus. Vitek died on November 2, 2007, at the age of 23 in a Russian hospital from the injuries. Covan slipped into a coma and was later moved to Poland. In 2008, Metal Mind Productions released the concert DVD Human's Dust.

=== Reformation and Carnival Is Forever (2009–2013) ===
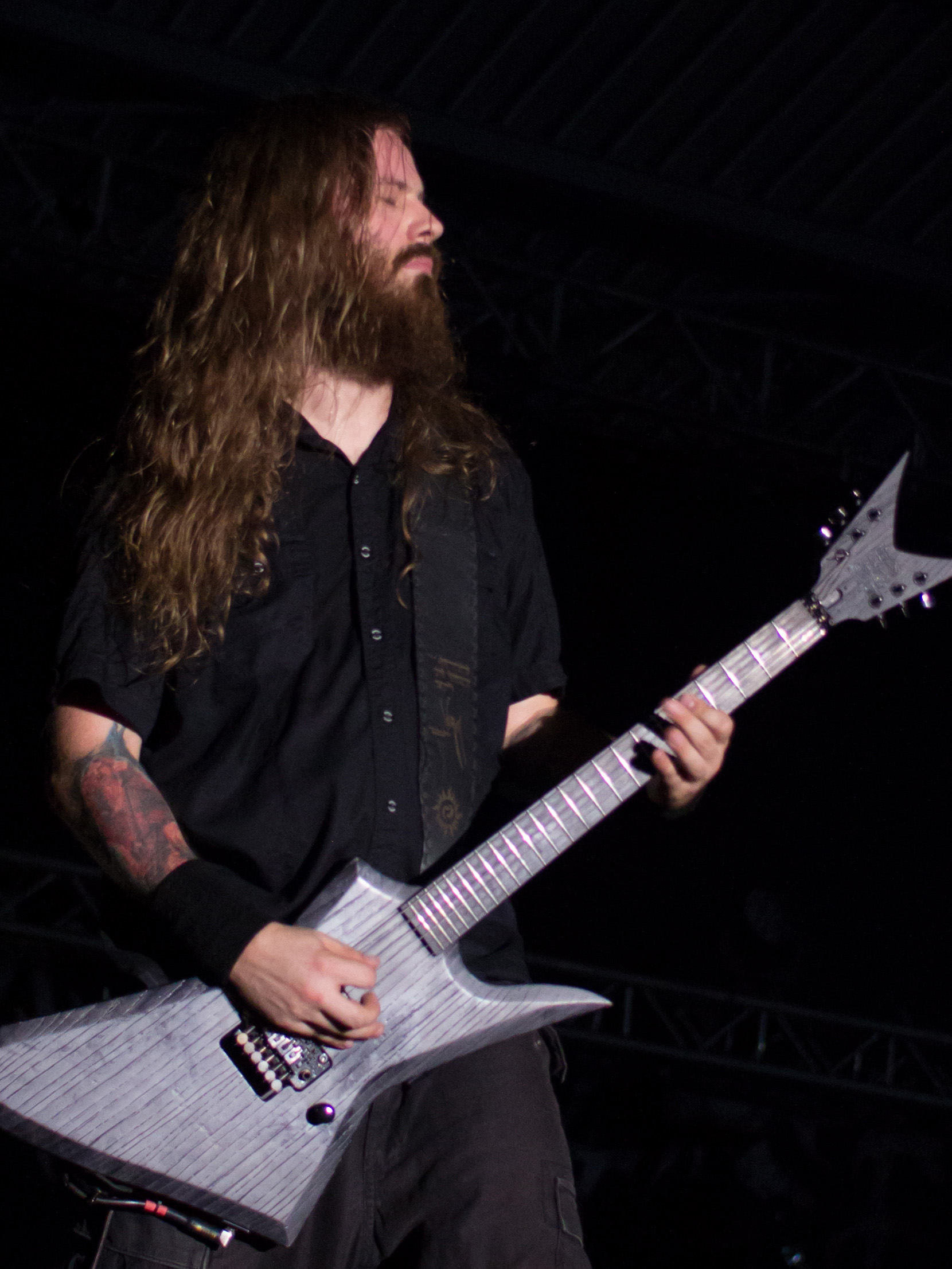
Guitarist and founding member Vogg in 2014

On March 8, 2009, after a period of disbandment, Vogg announced he was planning to continue the band and was searching for a new drummer and vocalist. Covan was unable to continue with Decapitated due to the slow improvement of his condition. In early 2009, Vogg participated on recording of the guitars for Vader's album Necropolis and continued with the band on a tour in support of the album, starting in September.

In mid-2009 Vogg stated: "It has been the hardest thing for me to move on without Vitek by my side, but he would have wanted me to continue with the band. Finally, I have found some great musicians who can continue the work of Vitek and Covan." "There's no sense in stopping this amazing thing we built up so many years ago together with Vitek, Sauron, Martin and Covan."

On July 31, 2009, the Austrian drummer Kerim "Krimh" Lechner of Thorns of Ivy joined Decapitated. On November 20, 2009, the new line-up was completed with the vocalist Rafał Piotrowski of the band Ketha and bassist Filip "Heinrich" Hałucha of Vesania and Masachist. Decapitated continued with support of Nuclear Blast record label and Hard Impact Music management. The band toured in United Kingdom in February 2010 as well as in April and May in Australia, New Zealand and European festivals and the Summer Slaughter tour in United States in mid-2010.

The band entered RG Studio in Gdańsk on February 9, 2011 to begin recording their fifth studio album entitled Carnival Is Forever. The album was produced by Vogg; while mixing and drums production was done by Swedish producer Daniel Bergstrand, who previously worked with Behemoth and Meshuggah among others. Heinrich departed from Decapitated after the recording in order to concentrate on Vesania, and Carnival Is Forever was released on July 12, 2011.

On November 1, 2011, the band was on board LOT Polish Airlines Flight 16 when the crew were unable to extend the landing gear and were forced to land the aircraft on its belly. Everyone aboard the flight survived. Decapitated went on a European tour with Meshuggah in mid-2012. Lechner left the band in September 2012 and was replaced by former Vader drummer Paweł Jaroszewicz. In late 2012, Decapitated played concerts in Nepal, Japan, and Thailand, among others. In 2013, the band joined Lamb of God on a tour in North America.

=== Blood Mantra, Anticult and members' arrests (2014–2020) ===
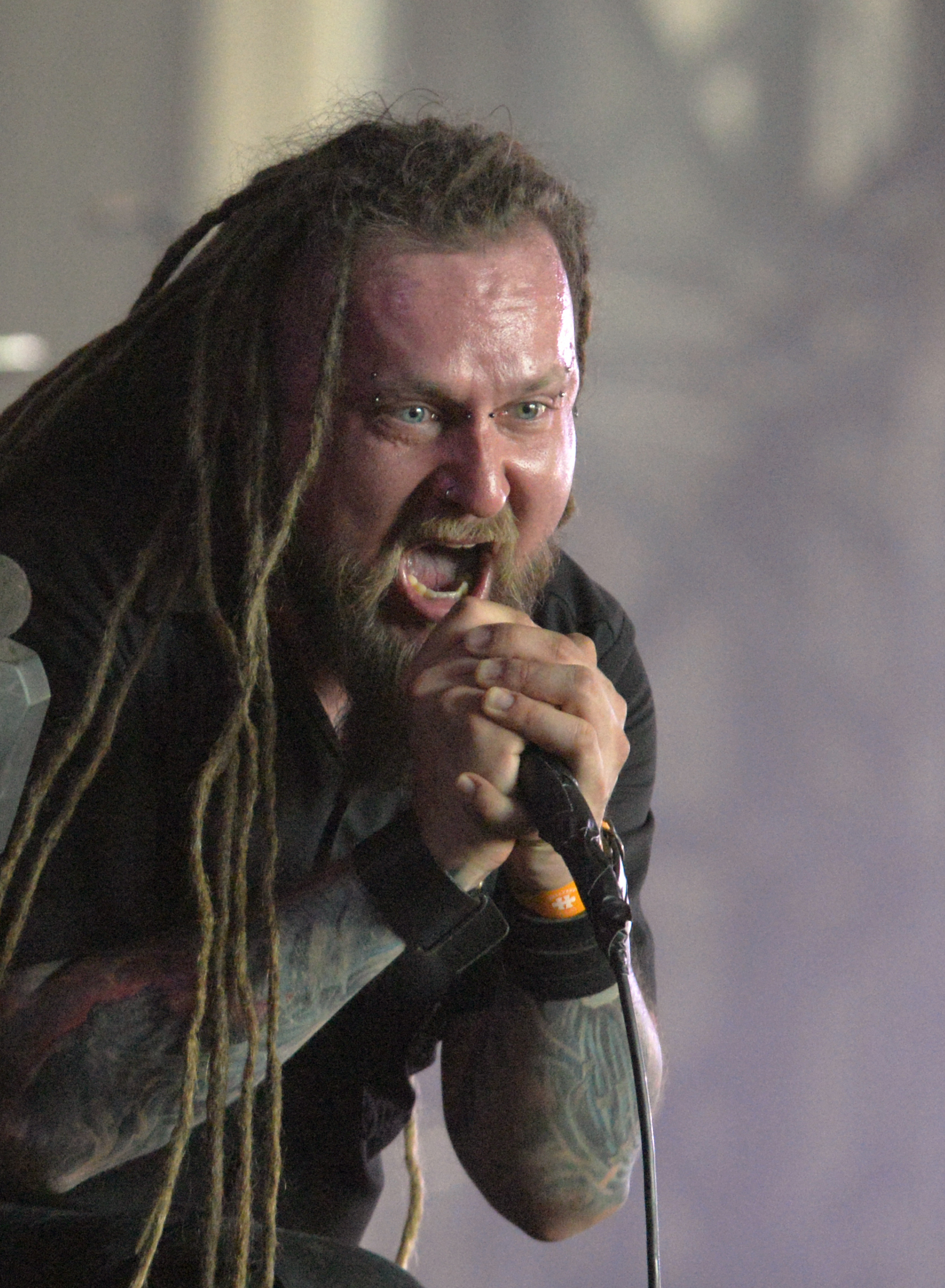
Piotrowski in 2017

On March 13, 2014, the band announced the addition of drummer Michał Łysejko to its lineup, who had been touring with Decapitated since January 2014. Decapitated recorded Blood Mantra during March in Hertz Studio in Poland, and released the album in September. During a tour in United States in October, the band was involved in serious van accident on the way to a show in New Orleans, Louisiana. Nobody was seriously injured and the band continued on tour. Decapitated accompanied Soulfly on their 2015 We Sold Our Souls To Metal Tour.

The album Anticult was released on July 7, 2017. Vogg stated about the songwriting process: "[This] album is one that we created together as a band. Our drummer, Michał [Łysejko], [helped] a lot with the arrangements and the songs. He's like the co-author of the songs. It's like I used to do with Vitek [Witold Kiełtyka]."

On 9 September 2017, all four members of Decapitated's line up at the time (Michał Łysejko, Wacław "Vogg" Kiełtyka, Rafał Piotrowski and Hubert Więcek) were arrested in Santa Ana, California, after a show while on tour with Thy Art Is Murder. Prior to the arrest, the band members had offered to surrender to the police as soon as they had learned of an investigation, but never heard anything back. After being extracted to Spokane, each band member was formally charged with rape in October 2017. Piotrowski and Kiełtyka were both charged with second degree rape, while Łysejko and Więcek's charges were for third degree rape. All members of the band plead not guilty to their respective criminal charges. All charges were dropped by prosecutors in January 2018, citing the "well-being of the victim" and "in the interest of justice", and the scheduled trial later that month was cancelled. According to Piotrowski's attorney Jeffry Finer, the accuser was heavily involved in the decision to drop charges and the band's defence attorneys also highlighted testimonies from numerous concert attendees and musicians from other bands in support of the band's version of events. In March 2018, Kiełtyka wrote a statement explicitly rejecting the accusations and describing the experience as "one of the most terrible and irrational times in our lives".

In July 2018, the band released a music video for the song "Kill The Cult" from their 2017 album. In December 2018, the band announced departure of drummer Łysejko.

On September 28, 2019, Vogg was announced as Phil Demmel's replacement in Machine Head for a tour. Vogg revealed that Decapitated would begin writing new music in 2020 for their eighth studio album. In September 2020, Decapitated re-signed with Nuclear Blast and also announced former touring drummer James Stewart has become a full-time band member, while bassist Hubert Więcek was no longer in the band.

=== Cancer Culture and next album (2021–present) ===
The band announced dates in July 2021 for their upcoming 2022 European tour to mark their 25th anniversary, with support from Black Tongue, Heart of a Coward and INFERI. Heart of a Coward later withdrew from the tour and were replaced with Archspire.

On March 17, 2022, the band announced their eighth studio album Cancer Culture would be released on May 27, and also released the title track from the album. They also revealed the album would feature guest performances from members of Jinjer and Machine Head. The album and music videos feature the return of Paweł Pasek on bass.

On February 17, 2024, while announcing his departure from Machine Head, Vogg confirmed that Decapitated has "a studio session lined up" for the next album. He was also open to joining new bands. Decapitated continued touring.

On October 11, 2024, it was announced vocalist Rasta had departed the band, and was being replaced by Eemeli Bodde of Mors Subita. It was also announced former vocalist Sauron would be performing with the band at the 2024 Damnation Festival.

Vogg confirmed in October 2025 that Decapitated has begun working on new material for their ninth studio album, with a tentative release date of 2026.

== Musical style and critical reception ==
Decapitated's music is written by Vogg, who co-worked with Vitek while writing prior to his death. Decapitated became known for its songwriting and technical instrumental approach at an extraordinarily young age and earned an international fan base in the underground music community. In the review of Decapitated's debut album, Allmusic said "the band has a seemingly effortless understanding and command of ... their instruments and ... the songwriting is extremely solid; even in the first listen." The characteristics of Nihility and Negation are "powerful, blastbeat-filled drumming, dissonant yet memorable guitar riffs, and inventive guitar solos" and substantially high production quality. In the review of The Negation, Metal Hammer states that "Sauron is one of the most capable vocalists on the scene". With Organic Halucinosis, Decapitated focused on non-traditional death metal aesthetics, more complex songwriting and grooves, and polyrhythmic approach; Covan contributed more versatile vocals. A notable element of groove is present in Decapitated's death metal sound, which has been often described as technical death metal. Vogg cited Dimebag Darrell of Pantera as an "inspiration for making groovy riffs". Recently, the band and their later musical output have been described as groove metal.

Decapitated's releases are some of death metal's most significant albums of the early 21st century. Winds of Creation was "responsible for re-igniting a stagnating death metal scene" and Organic Hallucinosis proved to be substantially influential in the subsequent development of the genre. According to Kerrang!, Decapitated have released "classic albums; (...) that have turned these youthful Poles into one of the genre's most widely respected bands. Tomas Haake, the drummer of the Swedish band Meshuggah, commented the death of Vitek: "The metal community has lost one of the most talented and skillful drummers of our time! [...] Vitek was a true talent and drummer genius." In 2017, Alternative Press described Decapitated as one of "death metal's elite" bands.

== Band members ==
Current

- Wacław "Vogg" Kiełtyka – guitar (1996−2007, 2009−present)
- Paweł Pasek – bass (2012−2016, 2021−present)
- James Stewart – drums (2020−present; touring musician 2018−2019)
- Eemeli Bodde – vocals (2024−present)

Former

- Witold "Vitek" Kiełtyka – drums (1996–2007) (died 2007)
- Wojciech "Sauron" Wąsowicz – vocals (1996–2005; touring 2024)
- Marcin "Martin" Rygiel – bass (1997–2005, 2006–2007)
- Adrian "Covan" Kowanek – vocals (2005–2007)
- Rafał "Rasta" Piotrowski – vocals (2009−2024)
- Kerim "Krimh" Lechner – drums (2009−2012)
- Filip "Heinrich" Hałucha – bass (2009−2011)
- Michał Łysejko – drums (2014−2018)
- Hubert Więcek – bass (2016−2020)

Former touring musicians

- Jacek Hiro – guitar (2000−2004) (Note: Between 2000 and 2004, Decapitated toured occasionally as a quintet, with the addition of second guitarist Jacek Hiro.)
- Richard Gulczynski – bass (2006)
- Konrad Rossa – bass (2011−2012)
- Paweł "Pawulon" Jaroszewicz – drums (2012−2013)
- Kevin Foley – drums (2013)
- Sean Martinez – bass (2016)
- Eugene Ryabchenko – drums (2019–2020)
- Ken Bedene – drums (2020)

Decapitated at Rockharz 2026

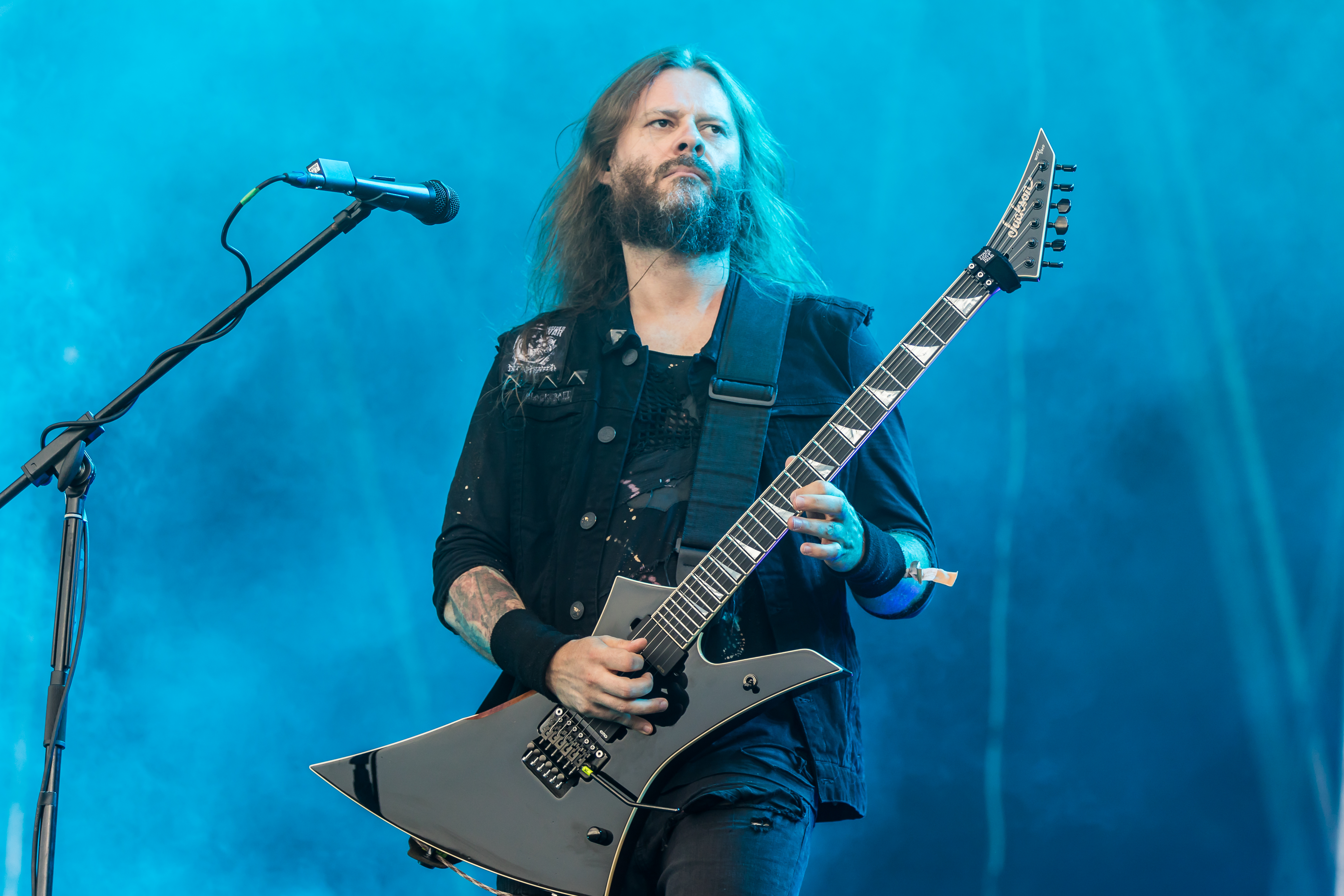
Wacław "Vogg" Kiełtyka, guitar

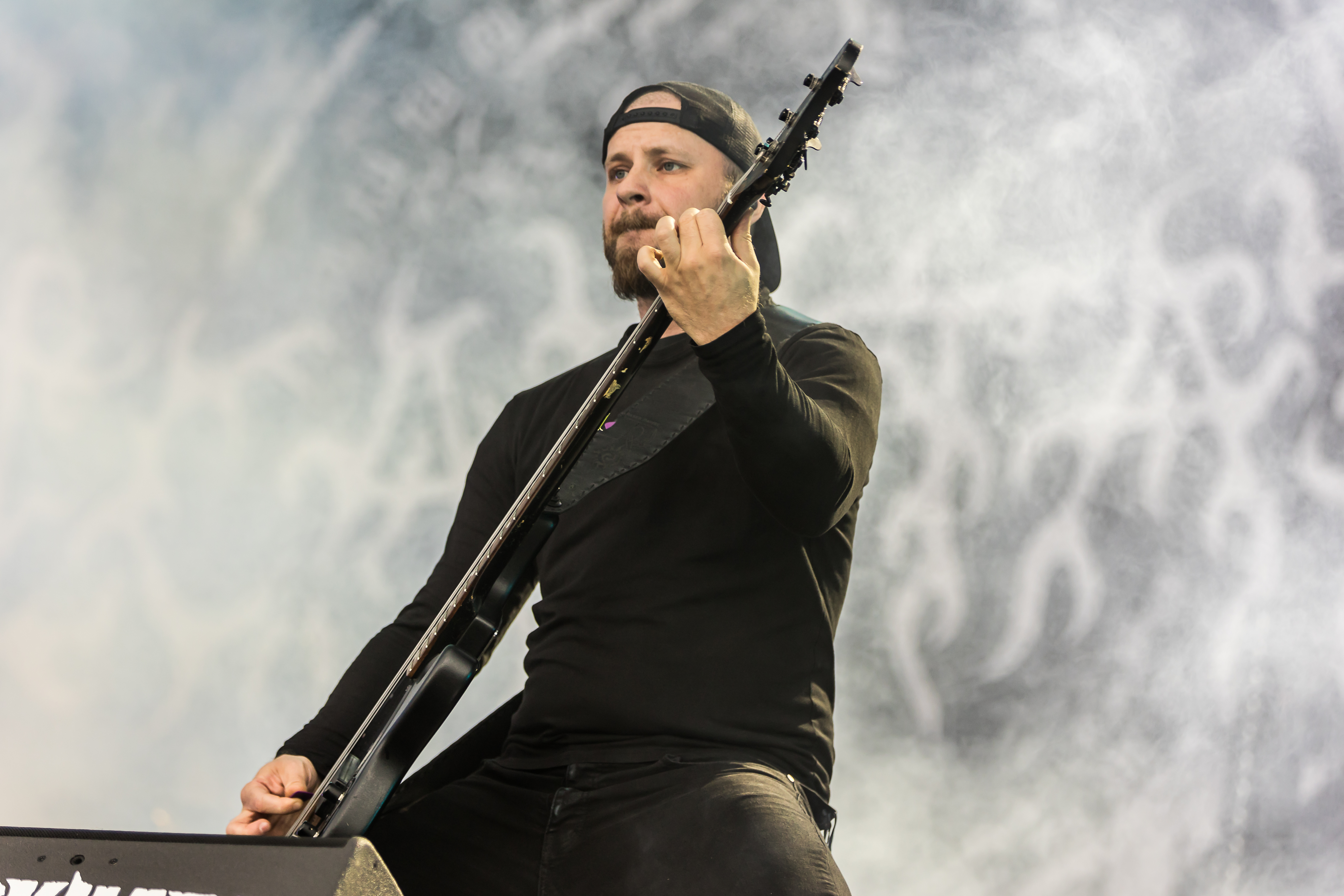
Paweł Pasek, bass

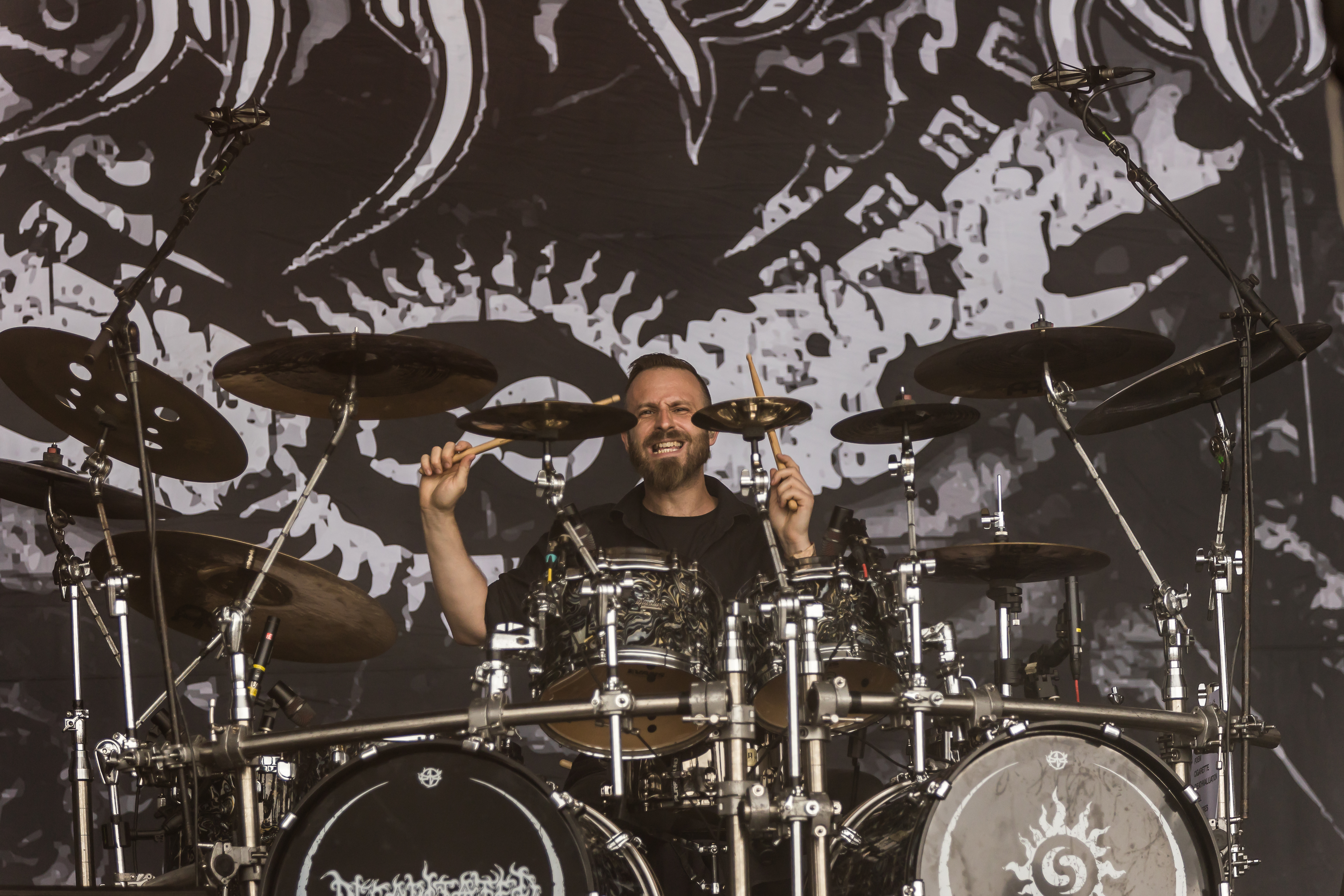
James Stewart, drums

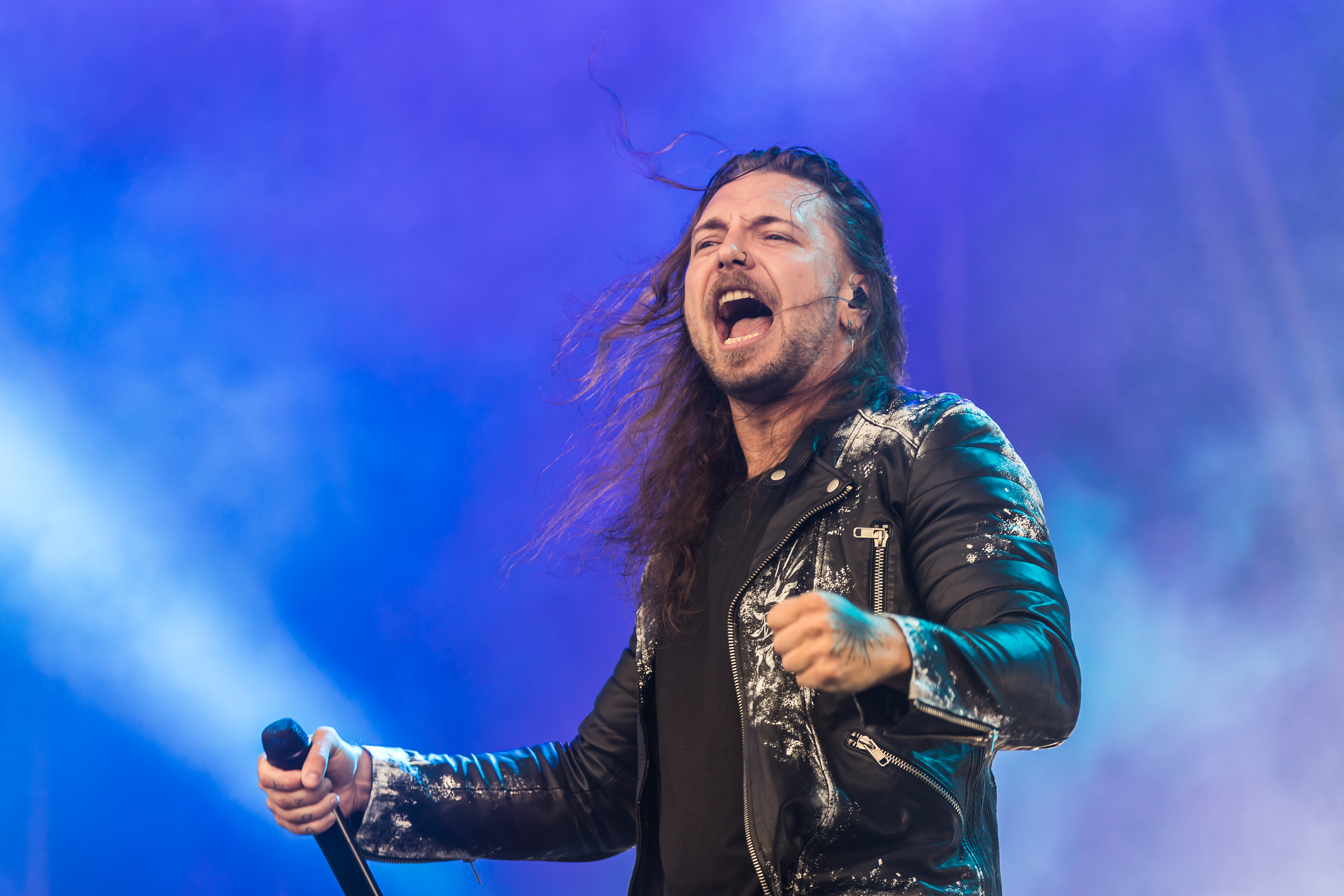
Eemeli Bodde, vocals

Timeline

== Discography ==
=== Studio albums ===
Title	Album details	Peak chart positions			Sales
Title	Album details	POL	JPN	US Heat	Sales
Winds of Creation	Released: April 11, 2000; Label: Earache Records; Formats: CD, CD+DVD, LP, CS, digital download	—	—	—	
Nihility	Released: February 19, 2002; Label: Earache Records; Formats: CD, LP, CS, digital download	—	—	—	
The Negation	Released: March 9, 2004; Label: Earache Records; Formats: CD, LP, digital download	—	—	—	US: 830+
Organic Hallucinosis	Released: February 7, 2006; Label: Earache Records; Formats: CD, 2 CD, DualDisc, LP, digital download	—	—	—	
Carnival Is Forever	Released: July 12, 2011; Label: Nuclear Blast; Formats: CD, CD+DVD, LP, digital download	—	—	11	US: 2,100+
Blood Mantra	Released: September 30, 2014; Label: Nuclear Blast; Formats: CD, CD+DVD, LP, digital download	11	—	5	US: 2,200+
Anticult	Released: July 7, 2017; Label: Nuclear Blast; Formats: CD, CD+DVD, LP, digital download	4	—	2	US: 2,700+
Cancer Culture	Released: May 27, 2022; Label: Nuclear Blast; Formats: CD, CD+DVD, LP, digital download	4	237	23	US: 2,400+
"—" denotes a recording that did not chart or was not released in that territory.

=== Compilation ===
Title	Album details
The First Damned	Released: November 20, 2000; Label: Metal Mind Productions; Formats: CD, CS

=== Demos ===
Title	Album details
Cemeterial Gardens	Released: July 1997; Label: Self-released; Formats: CS
The Eye of Horus	Released: November 1998; Label: Self-released; Formats: CS

=== Split album ===
Title	Album details	Note
Polish Assault	Released: October 31, 2000; Label: Relapse Records; Formats: CD	split with Yattering, Damnable, and Lost Soul

=== Video album ===
Title	Album details
Human's Dust	Released: June 9, 2008 (Europe), June 10, 2008 (United States); Label: Metal Mind Productions; Formats: DVD
