= Winds of Creation =

Studio album by Decapitated
- Released: 17 April 2000
- Recorded: 1999, Selani Studio, Olsztyn, Poland
- Genre: Technical death metal
- Length: 40:46
- Label: Wicked World, Earache, Koch International Poland
- Producer: Piotr Wiwczarek

Decapitated chronology
Winds of Creation (2000)	Nihility (2002)

Winds of Creation is the debut studio album by Polish death metal band Decapitated. It was released through Earache Records subsidiary Wicked World on 17 April 2000. It was produced by Piotr Wiwczarek (aka Peter), from Polish death metal band Vader.

During the album's development, all of the members were notably aged 18 and younger. Drummer Vitek (born January 1984) was 15, bassist Rygiel (born April 1983) was 16, guitarist Vogg (born December 1981) was 17, and vocalist Sauron (born June 1981) was 18 at the time of recording.

== Critical reception ==
Professional ratings
Review scores
Source	Rating
AllMusic	4.5/5 stars
Exclaim!	favorable
Distorted Sound	favorable

After its release, Winds of Creation received positive reviews from music critics. Matthias Sheaks of AllMusic said "[...] songwriting is extremely solid; even in the first listen, songs such as the manically frenzied "Blessed" and the beautifully haunting "Dance Macabre" stand out and away from the strange dissonance of "The First Damned" and the call-and-response riffage of "Nine Steps."

== Track listing ==
All lyrics are written by Sauron, except where noted; all music is composed by Decapitated.

No.	Title	Length
1.	"Winds of Creation"	4:13
2.	"Blessed"	5:06
3.	"The First Damned"	5:47
4.	"Way to Salvation"	3:54
5.	"The Eye of Horus"	5:25
6.	"Human's Dust"	4:50
7.	"Nine Steps"	5:11
8.	"Dance Macabre" (instrumental)	2:47
9.	"Mandatory Suicide" (Slayer cover)	3:32
Total length:		40:46

== Personnel ==
=== Decapitated ===
- Wojciech "Sauron" Wąsowicz – vocals
- Wacław "Vogg" Kiełtyka – guitars
- Marcin "Martin" Rygiel – bass
- Witold "Vitek" Kiełtyka – drums

=== Production ===
- Piotr Wiwczarek – production
- Andy Bomba – engineering, mixing
- Bartłomiej Kuźniak – mastering
- Jacek Wiśniewski – cover art

== Release history ==
Formats	Date	Label	Region
CD, CD+DVD, LP, CS, digital download	April 10, 2000	Earache Records/Koch International Poland	Poland
CD, CD+DVD, LP, CS, digital download	April 11, 2000	Wicked World/Earache Records	UK, Europe, United States
CD, CD+DVD, LP, CS, digital download	December 4, 2007	Earache Records	UK, Europe, United States
CD, CD+DVD, LP, CS, digital download	July 26, 2010	Earache Records	UK, Europe, United States
