= Crionics =

Polish blackened death metal band

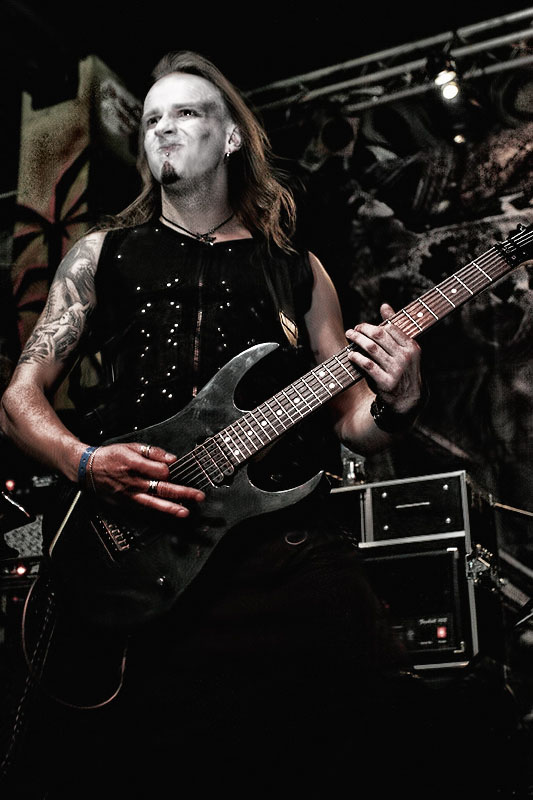

Background information
- Origin: Kraków, Poland
- Genres: Blackened death metal black metal (early)
- Labels: Candlelight, Demonic, Empire Records, MSR Productions
- Members: Przemyslaw Olbryt; Dariusz Styczeń; Paweł Jaroszewicz; Wacław Borowiec; Rafał Brauer
- Past members: (See below)
- Website: crionics.rockmetal.pl

Crionics was a Polish blackened death metal band from Kraków that Michał Skotniczny, Dariusz Styczeń, "Marcotic" and Maciej Zięba formed in 1997. Early on, they played melodic metal influenced by Norwegian black metal band Emperor. Crionics disbanded in 2011, after releasing the EP Noir.

== Band history ==
A year after forming, the band recorded five songs that have never been released because of bad production. Six months later, the band recorded a four-track demo. It contained a cover of Emperor's "I am the Black Wizards". In 1999, Crionics recruited guitarist Bartosz Bielewicz. Bielewicz contributed to the band's second demo, Beyond the Blazing Horizon, recorded in their home studio. In 2000, Maciej Kowalski replaced drummer Maciej Zięba. In August 2002, the first studio album, Human Error: Ways to Selfdestruction, was released. Early in 2004, Crionics released their second album, Armageddon's Evolution. That year, they signed a three-record deal with Candlelight Records. In 2007, their third and latest album, Neuthrone, was released.

== Band members ==
Final line-up

- Przemyslaw "Quazarre " Olbryt – lead vocals, rhythm guitar (2008–2011)
- Dariusz "Yanuary" Styczeń – lead guitar, backing vocals (1997–2011), bass (studio only; 2004–2008)
- Paweł "Paul" Jaroszewicz – drums, percussions (2008–2011)
- Wacław "Vac-V" Borowiec – keyboards, electronics, backing vocals (1997–2011)
- Rafał "Brovar" Brauer – bass, backing vocals (2008–2011)

Former members

- Michał "War-A.N" Skotniczny – lead vocals, rhythm guitar (1997–2008)
- Bartosz "Bielmo" Bielewicz – guitar, backing vocals (1999–2001)
- Maciej "Chemosh" Zięba – drums (1997–2000)
- Maciej "Darkside" Kowalski – drums (2000–2008)
- Markus "Marcotic" Kopa – bass, backing vocals (1997–2004)

Live members

- Dariusz "Daray" Brzozowski – drums (2005)
- Łukasz "Lucass" Krzesiewicz – drums (2010)
- James Stewart – drums (2010)
- Konrad "Destroyer" Ramotowski – bass, backing vocals (2004–2007)
- Filip "Heinrich" Hałucha – bass, backing vocals (2007)
- Jakub "Jackobh" Czekierda – bass, backing vocals (2010)

== Discography ==
Studio albums

- Human Error: Ways to Selfdestruction (2002)
- Armageddon's Evolution (2004)
- Neuthrone (2007)

EPs

- Beyond the Blazing Horizon (2000)
- N.O.I.R. (2010)

Demos

- Demo 98 (1998)

Music videos

Year	Title	Directed	Album
2007	"Humanmeat Cargo"	Besz Film	Neuthrone
2011	"Scapegoat (Welcome to Necropolis)"	Marek Oleksy	N.O.I.R.
