= List of heavy metal bass guitarists =

This is a list of notable heavy metal bass guitarists.

== A ==
- Alver (Emperor, Dødheimsgard)
- Stefan Adika (Guns N' Roses)
- Pete Agnew (Nazareth)
- Jarkko Ahola (Teräsbetoni, Northern Kings, Dreamtale)
- Mike Alexander (Evile)
- Jared Anderson (Morbid Angel, Hate Eternal)
- Mårten Andersson (Steelheart, Lizzy Borden, George Lynch)
- Nicke Andersson (The Hellacopters, Death Breath)
- Simon Andersson (Pain of Salvation, Darkwater)
- Felipe Andreoli (Angra, Karma, Almah)
- Michael Anthony (Van Halen)
- Tom Araya (Slayer)
- Felipe Arcuri (Arkangel, Arcuri Overthrow)
- Jennifer Arroyo (Kittie, Suicide City)
- Reginald Arvizu (Korn)
- Talena Atfield (Kittie, Amphibious Assault)

== B ==
- Peter Baltes (Accept)
- Roger J. Beaujard
- Beefcake the Mighty (Gwar)
- Jo Bench (Bolt Thrower)
- Frank Bello (Anthrax)
- Glen Benton (Deicide)
- Jonas Björler (At the Gates, The Haunted)
- Mark Boals (Royal Hunt)
- Rachel Bolan (Skid Row)
- Trevor Bolder (Uriah Heep)
- Will Boyd (Evanescence)
- Dan Briggs (Between the Buried and Me)
- Rex Brown (Pantera, Rebel Meets Rebel)
- Steve Broy (The Mentors)
- Pat Bruders (Goatwhore)
- Olivia Newton Bundy (Marilyn Manson)
- Geoff Bergman (Curl Up and Die, Poison the Well)
- Victor Borge (TNT)
- Francis Buchholz (Scorpions)
- Nicholas Bullen (Napalm Death, Alienist)
- Adam Buszko (Hate)
- Jo Burt (Black Sabbath)
- Cliff Burton (Metallica)
- Geezer Butler (Black Sabbath)
- Michael Butler (Exodus)
- Terry Butler (Six Feet Under, Death)

== C ==
- Richard Cabeza (Unanimated, Dismember)
- John Campbell (Lamb of God)
- Tony Campos (Static-X)
- Richie Castellano (Blue Öyster Cult)
- Justin Chancellor (Peach, Tool)
- Tony Choy (Atheist, Cynic, Pestilence)
- Johnny Christ (Avenged Sevenfold)
- Andy Christell (Electric Boys, Hanoi Rocks)
- Greg Christian (Testament)
- Petros Christo (Firewind)
- Tim Commerford (Rage Against the Machine)
- Kelly Conlon (Death, Vital Remains)
- John Cooper (Skillet)
- Roxanne Constantin (Quo Vadis)
- Robbie Crane (Ratt)
- Juan Croucier (Ratt)
- Nocturno Culto (Darkthrone)

== D ==
- Piggy D. (Rob Zombie)
- Bob Daisley (Black Sabbath, Rainbow, Uriah Heep, Ozzy Osbourne, Living Loud, Gary Moore)
- Paul D'Amour (Tool)
- Sharlee D'Angelo (Arch Enemy)
- Mike D'Antonio (Killswitch Engage)
- Traa Daniels (P.O.D.)
- Rob Darken (Graveland, Lord Wind)
- Steve Dawson (Saxon)
- Johan De Farfalla (Opeth)
- Joerg Deisinger (Bonfire)
- Joey DeMaio (Manowar)
- Derek DeSantis (Twisted Method, Dope)
- John DeServio (Black Label Society)
- Cello Dias (Against All Will)
- Steve Di Giorgio (Death, Autopsy, Control Denied, Testament, Vintersorg, Iced Earth, Sebastian Bach, Charred Walls of the Damned, Obituary)
- Brad Divens (Souls at Zero)
- Trish Doan (Kittie)
- Adam Doll (The Dillinger Escape Plan)
- Mariusz Duda (Riverside)
- Adam Dutkiewicz (Killswitch Engage)

== E ==
- Robin Eaglestone (Cradle of Filth, Abgott)
- Leif Edling (Candlemass, Abstrakt Algebra)
- Olve Eikemo (Immortal)
- David Ellefson (Megadeth)
- Tomas Elofsson (Sanctification, Hypocrisy)
- Shane Embury (Napalm Death)
- Chris Estes (King Diamond)
- Kostas Exarhakis (Firewind)

== F ==
- Kevin Falk (Between the Buried and Me, Every Time I Die, The Material)
- Fenriz (Valhall, Darkthrone)
- Tracy Ferrie (Stryper, Michael Sweet)
- Tony Franklin (Roy Harper, Whitesnake)

== G ==
- Tim Gaines (Stryper)
- Galder (Dimmu Borgir)
- Kristoffer Gildenlöw (Pain of Salvation, Dial)
- Roger Glover (Deep Purple, Rainbow)
- Franz Gottschalk (Illdisposed)
- Billy Gould (Faith No More)
- Tarkan Gözübüyük (Mezarkabul)
- Joel Graham (Rise to Addiction, Evile)
- Paul Gray (Slipknot)
- Paolo Gregoletto (Trivium)
- Scott Griffin (L.A. Guns)
- Markus Grosskopf (Helloween)
- Patrice Guers (Rhapsody of Fire)
- Ivan Guilhon (Tribuzy)

== H ==
- Filip Hałucha (Vesania, UnSun, Rootwater)
- Tom Hamilton (Aerosmith)
- Anders Hammer (Nightrage, Dragonland)
- Felix Hanemann (Harry Slash & The Slashtones, Zebra)
- Timi Hansen (Mercyful Fate)
- Steve Harris (Iron Maiden)
- Marko Hietala (Nightwish, Tarot, Sinergy, Northern Kings)
- Ian Hill (Judas Priest)
- Sami Hinkka (Rapture, Ensiferum)
- Vinnie Hornsby (Sevendust)
- Glenn Hughes (Deep Purple)

== I ==
- Ihsahn (Emperor)
- Mike Inez (Alice in Chains, Ozzy Osbourne, Black Label Society, Heart)
- Infernus (Gorgoroth)
- Fredrik Isaksson (Therion, Grave)
- David Isberg (Opeth, Therion)
- Peter Iwers (In Flames)

== J ==
- Adrian Jackson (My Dying Bride)
- Eddie Jackson (Queensrÿche)
- Taneli Jarva (Sentenced, The Black League)
- Todd Jensen (Hardline)
- Stian Johannsen (Mayhem)
- Paulo Jr. (Sepultura)

== K ==
- Jari Kainulainen (Stratovarius, Killing Machine, Evergrey, Symfonia)
- Bob Kakaha (Damageplan, Hellyeah)
- Mike Kaufmann (Defiance)
- Jack Kilcoyne (Mushroomhead)
- Kim Nielsen-Parsons (Phantom Blue, Asia)
- King ov Hell (Gorgoroth)
- Grutle Kjellson (Enslaved, Darkthrone)
- Jan-Chris de Koeijer (Gorefest)
- Jukka Koskinen (Norther, Cain's Offering, Wintersun)
- Chris Kringel (Cynic)
- Kenny Kweens (Beautiful Creatures, L.A. Guns)
- Lemmy Kilmister (Motörhead)

== L ==
- Jean-Michel Labadie (Gojira)
- Tim Lambesis (As I Lay Dying)
- Conrad "Cronos" Lant (Venom)
- Johan Larsson (In Flames, HammerFall)
- Frédéric Leclercq (DragonForce)
- Geddy Lee (Rush)
- Michael Lepond (Symphony X, Rattlebone)
- John Levén (Europe)
- Dan Lilker (Nuclear Assault, Holy Moses)
- James LoMenzo (Ozzy Osbourne, Megadeth)
- Alessandro Lotta (Rhapsody of Fire)
- Dick Lövgren (Meshuggah)
- Phil Lynott (Thin Lizzy)

== M ==
- James MacDonough (Iced Earth, Megadeth, Nevermore)
- Paweł Mąciwoda (Scorpions)
- Tim McCord (Evanescence)
- Ron McGovney (Metallica, Leather Charm)
- Duff McKagan (Guns N' Roses, Velvet Revolver, Loaded)
- Sean Malone (Gordian Knot, Cynic)
- Brian Marshall (Creed, Alter Bridge)
- Ryan Martinie (Mudvayne)
- Jeff Matz (High on Fire)
- Melody Licious (Broadzilla, Gore Gore Girls)
- Memnock (Susperia)
- Marco Mendoza (Blue Murder, Thin Lizzy)
- Mark Mendoza (Twisted Sister)
- Robbie Merrill (Godsmack)
- MickDeth (Eighteen Visions, Clear)
- Asgeir Mickelson (Ihsahn, Borknagar)
- Billy Milano (Stormtroopers of Death)
- Ole Moe (Aura Noir, Immortal)
- Mooseman
- Robin Moulder (Jack Off Jill)
- Martin Motnik (Accept)
- John Moyer (Disturbed)
- William Murderface (Dethklok)
- Neil Murray (Whitesnake, Black Sabbath, Michael Schenker Group)
- John Myung (Dream Theater)

== N ==
- Masayoshi Yamashita (Loudness)
- Necrobutcher (Mayhem)
- Jason Newsted (Metallica, Echobrain, Flotsam and Jetsam, Voivod, Ozzy Osbourne)
- Rob Nicholson (Rob Zombie, Ozzy Osbourne)
- Johan Niemann (Evil Masquerade, Therion)

== O ==
- Shavo Odadjian (System of a Down)
- Orion (Behemoth)
- Wanda Ortiz (The Iron Maidens)

== P ==
- Hal Patino (King Diamond)
- Roger Patterson (Atheist)
- Joe Payne (Divine Heresy)
- Lee Payne (Cloven Hoof)
- György Pazdera (Pokolgép)
- Doug Pinnick (King's X)
- Csaba Pintér (Pokolgép)
- Lauri Porra (Sinergy, Stratovarius)
- Joe Preston (Thrones)
- Hugo Prinsen Geerligs (The Gathering)
- Joe Principe (Rise Against, 88 Fingers Louie)

== R ==
- Will Rahmer (Mortician)
- Bruno Ravel (Danger Danger)
- Jonas Reingold (Opus Atlantica, Time Requiem)
- Reyash (Vader)
- Oliver Riedel (Rammstein)
- Pascual Romero (In This Moment, Daysend)
- Share Ross (Vixen, Contraband)
- Shaun Ross (Suicidal Tendencies, Hirax, Excel)
- Lars Rosenberg (Entombed, Carbonized, Serpent, Therion)
- Steve Rowe (Mortification)

== S ==
- Jeanne Sagan (All That Remains)
- Troy Sanders (Mastodon)
- Rudy Sarzo (Quiet Riot, Ozzy Osbourne, Whitesnake, Dio)
- Rick Savage (Def Leppard)
- Marcel Schirmer (Destruction)
- Dirk Schlächter (Gamma Ray)
- Evan Seinfeld (Biohazard)
- Henkka Seppälä (Children of Bodom)
- Niilo Sevänen (Insomnium)
- Billy Sheehan (Talas, David Lee Roth, UFO, Mr. Big, Sons of Apollo)
- Shagrath (Dimmu Borgir)
- Rani Sharone (Stolen Babies)
- Lars Eric Si (Winds)
- Gene Simmons (Kiss)
- Melanie Sisneros (Crescent Shield)
- Nikki Sixx (Mötley Crüe)
- Tim Sköld (KMFDM, Marilyn Manson)
- Muzz Skillings (Living Colour)
- Jimmie Lee Sloas (The Imperials)
- Brendon Small (Dethklok)
- Tyler Smith (Greeley Estates, The Word Alive)
- Kyle Sokol (Rude Squad)
- Ville Sorvali (Moonsorrow)
- Paul Speckmann (Master)
- Dave Spitz (Black Sabbath, Nuclear Assault)
- Mike Starr (Alice in Chains, Sun Red Sun)
- Peter Steele (Type O Negative, Carnivore)
- Tommy Stinson (The Replacements, Guns N' Roses)
- Todd Strange (Crowbar, Down)
- Byron Stroud (Fear Factory, City of Fire)
- Dana Strum (Slaughter)
- Stein Sund (Einherjer)
- Dan Swanö (Bloodbath, Edge of Sanity, Nightingale)
- Michael Sweet (Stryper)

== T ==
- Taiji (X Japan, Loudness)
- Dallas Taylor (Maylene and the Sons of Disaster)
- Tchort (Emperor, Green Carnation, Einherjer)
- Jeroen Paul Thesseling (Obscura, Pestilence)
- Jan Erik Tiwaz (Borknagar, Satyricon, Emperor)
- Andrew Tompkins (Paramaecium)
- Derrick Tribbett (Twisted Method, Dope)
- Brynjard Tristan (Old Man's Child)
- Robert Trujillo (Metallica, Suicidal Tendencies, Ozzy Osbourne)

== U ==
- Sami Uusitalo (Finntroll, Shape of Despair)

== V ==
- Martin van Drunen (Pestilence, Asphyx, Bolt Thrower, With Hail of Bullets)
- Wolfgang Van Halen (Van Halen)
- Sami Vänskä (Nightwish, Nattvindens Gråt)
- Joey Vera (Fates Warning, Armored Saint, Anthrax, Engine)
- David Vincent (Soulfly, Morbid Angel)
- ICS Vortex (Dimmu Borgir)
- Vrangsinn (Carpathian Forest)

== W ==
- Peavy Wagner (Rage)
- Frank Watkins (Obituary, Gorgoroth)
- Pete Way (UFO)
- Alex Webster (Cannibal Corpse)
- John Wetton (Uriah Heep)
- Jeordie White (Nine Inch Nails, Marilyn Manson)
- Peter Wichers (Soilwork, Warrel Dane)
- Hank Williams III
- Liam Wilson (The Dillinger Escape Plan, Starkweather)
- Doug Wimbish (Living Colour, Tarja)
- Kip Winger (Winger, Alice Cooper)
- Sigurd Wongraven (Satyricon, Thorns)

== Y ==
- Sean Yseult (White Zombie)
