= Mindless Mass =

Sphere - Mindless Mass

Studio album by Sphere
- Released: 19 June 2015
- Recorded: July 2014
- Studio: Sound Division Studio; Heinrich House
- Genre: brutal death metal
- Length: 49:27
- Label: Deformeathing Production
- Producer: Filip 'Heinrich' Hałucha

Sphere chronology
Homo Hereticus	Sphere - Mindless Mass

Mindless Mass is the third album of the Polish brutal death metal act Sphere. The LP was recorded in Sound Division studio, mixed, mastered and produced in Heinrich House, all supervised by Filip 'Heinricha' Hałucha, and released on CD by Deformeathing Production on 19 June 2015. Cover art is by Perversor.

The album consists of 12 brutal death tracks with a strong touch of melodies and old school death metal, plus intro and outro. Jacek Hiro, known from his contribution in bands such as Sceptic, Decapitated, Voodoo Gods, Vader, Dies Irae has a guitar solo on the Leash track.

Mindless Mass was promoted by a videoclip for the "Society Foetus" track.

== Track listing ==
1. "Come to Us!" (intro, music: Michał Staczkun) – 1:02
2. "Baptism" (lyrics: Olga Górczyńska, Dawidek, music: Iron) – 2:57
3. "Society Foetus" (lyrics: Olga Górczyńska, Dawidek, music: Diego) – 2:58
4. "Spider's Web" (lyrics: Olga Górczyńska, Dawidek, music: Diego) – 3:34
5. "Retaliation" (lyrics: Laska, music: Diego) – 2:55
6. "Let to Live" (lyrics: Diego, music: Diego) – 3:05
7. "Cage of Conformity" (lyrics: Diego, music: Iron) – 2:29
8. "Leash" (lyrics: Olga Górczyńska, Dawidek, music: Iron) – 3:48
9. "Mindless Mass" (lyrics: Dawidek, music: Iron) – 3:58
10. "Golden Calf Sculpture" (lyrics: Diego, music: Iron) – 2:04
11. "Red Hood" (lyrics: Olga Górczyńska, Dawidek, music: Diego) – 3:49
12. "Manifesto" (lyrics: Diego, Dawidek, music: Diego) – 5:49
13. "Spring Lullaby" (lyrics: Olga Górczyńska, music: Iron) – 3:24
14. "I Am the Cross" (outro, music: Diego) – 7:35

== Personnel ==
- Th0rn - drums
- Diego - guitars
- Beton - bass, backing vocals
- Iron - guitars
- Dawidek - vocals
