= Sphere (Polish band) =

Polish death metal band

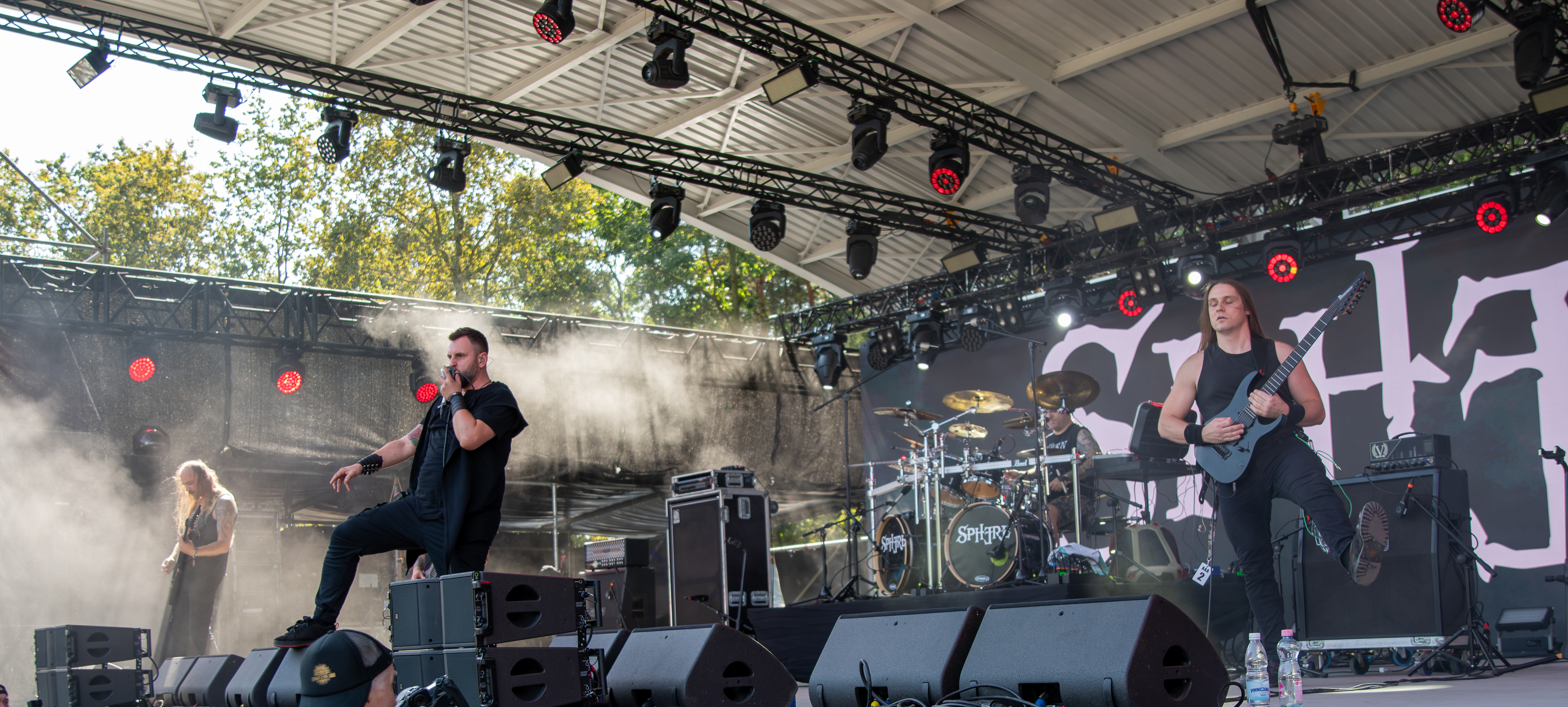
- Sphere in 2024

Background information
- Origin: Warsaw, Poland
- Genres: Brutal death metal
- Years active: 2002–present
- Labels: Empire Records, Masterful Records, Deformeathing Production
- Members: Michał "Th0rn" Bruchalski – drums (since 2002); Jacek "V"- vocal; Remek "Regore" bass; Artur "Xan" Grabarczyk – guitars (since 2015)
- Past members: Burning – bass Ścieras – bass Łukasz – guitars Lechu – guitars Cthulhu – guitars Sapen – vocals, keyboards Bolek – guitars (2002); Jasiek – vocals (2002); Analripper – vocals (2005–2013); Laska – vocals Vivi – guitars (2012–2013); Jakub "Iron" Ryt – guitars (2014–2015); Jakub "Diego" Tokaj – guitars (2012–2016); Dawid "Dawidek" Wolański – vocals (2014–2016)

Sphere is a Polish brutal death metal band formed in Warsaw in 2002.

== History ==
Established in Warsaw in 2002, with Bolek (guitars), Val (guitars), Th0rn (drums) and Jasiek (vocals) as the original members. In 2004, after several line-up changes, the band released a Spiritual Dope demo.

In 2005, Analripper, known also from death/grind Pyorrhoea, joined the band as the vocalist.

On 20 January 2007, the band debuted with the Damned Souls Rituals LP, released through Empire Records. The album was recorded in Zed Studio, Olkusz, Poland and was spread out in 5000 copies.

Three years later, in 2010 Sphere entered Zed Studio again to record their second album. The Homo Hereticus was released by Masterful Records on 10 February 2012. The music stemmed from death metal origin yet was enriched with fresh groovy ideas.

For the next two years the band played a number of concerts including the ones with bands such as Cannibal Corpse, Cryptopsy, Vital Remains, Obituary, and Disgorge. In the meantime other personnel changes took place and in July 2014, including: Th0rn – drums, Diego – guitars, Beton – bass, Iron – guitars, Dawidek – vocals, Sphere recorded the material for their third Mindless Mass LP. The whole recording process was supervised by Filip 'Heinrich' Hałucha and done in Sound Division Studio, Warsaw, Poland. Guest solo part to the Leash track was recorded by Jacek Hiro. Shortly afterwards Iron decided to leave the band, replaced by an Artur 'Xan' Grabarczyk.

Mindless Mass has been released as the CD under the wings of Deformeathig Production on 19 June 2015 roku. It is being promoted by a Society Foetus videoclip.

2016 brought another line up changes, some could call it traditional: first Diego then Dawidek parted ways with the band.

== Members ==
- Th0rn – drums
- Beton – bass
- Xan – guitars

== Discography ==
- Spiritual Dope (2004, demo, self-release)
- Damned Souls Rituals (2007, Empire Records)
- Homo Hereticus (2012, Masterful Records)
- Mindless Mass (2015, Deformeathing Production)
