= Lady Luck (album) =

Studio album by Broadzilla
- Released: (United States) October 2001
- Recorded: 2001
- Label: Diamond Star Records

Broadzilla chronology
Broadzilla vs. the Tramp-o-Lean (1999)	Lady Luck (2001)

Lady Luck is the second full-length album by the American rock band Broadzilla, released in October 2001. The album was instrumental in Broadzilla's winning of several Detroit Music Awards.

== Track listing ==
1. Ecstasy (May) – 3:36
2. Liquor Snatch (May/Essiambre) – 3:54
3. Diamond Sex Goddess (May) – 3:49
4. Y Did U Have 2B Psycho? (May/Essiambre) – 3:15
5. High Society (May) – 5:36
6. Sacred Heart Song (May) – 2:14
7. Lady Luck (May) – 2:21
8. On the Run (May/Essiambre) – 3:07
9. Stargazer (May) – 3:35
10. Four: Twenty (May/Essiambre) – 3:01
11. Love Child (Sawyer/Taylor/Wilson/Richards) – 3:01
12. Burn Baby Burn! (May) – 3:29
13. Liquor Snatch – Detroit Techno Remix (May/Essiambre) – 20:54

Note: The track "Liquor Snatch – Detroit Techno Remix" contains two different remixes of the original track by DJ Sean Deason, separated by approximately 7:23 of dead space.

== Personnel ==
Rachel May (vocals, guitar)
Kim Essiambre (bass, backing vocals)
Angie Manly (drums, backing vocals)
