= Erebos (album) =

Studio album by Hate
- Released: 15 November 2010 (EU), 22 February 2011 (US)
- Recorded: July and August 2010
- Studio: Hertz Recording Studio, Białystok, Poland
- Genre: Blackened death metal
- Length: 48:26
- Label: Listenable
- Producer: Adam "ATF Sinner" Buszko, Krzysztof "Kris" Wawrzak

Hate chronology
Morphosis (2008)	Erebos (2010)	Solarflesh – A Gospel of Radiant Divinity (2013)

Professional ratings
Review scores
Source	Rating
Blistering	9.5/10 stars

Erebos is the seventh studio album by Polish band Hate. It was released on 15 November 2010 through Listenable Records. The album was recorded between July and August 2010 at Hertz Studio in Białystok, Poland, and was produced by Adam "ATF Sinner" Buszko and Krzysztof "Kris" Wawrzak.

A video was shot for the title song, which was directed by Sławomir Makowski.

== Track listing ==
No.	Title	Lyrics	Music	Length
1.	"Genesis" (instrumental)		Adam Buszko	01:47
2.	"Lux Aeterna"	Adam Buszko	Adam Buszko, Stanisław Malanowicz	04:53
3.	"Erebos"	Adam Buszko	Adam Buszko, Stanisław Malanowicz	04:57
4.	"Quintessence of Higher Suffering"	Adam Buszko	Adam Buszko, Stanisław Malanowicz	04:45
5.	"Trinity Moons"	Adam Buszko	Adam Buszko, Stanisław Malanowicz	05:57
6.	"Hero Cults"	Adam Buszko	Adam Buszko, Stanisław Malanowicz	05:00
7.	"Transsubstance"	Adam Buszko	Adam Buszko, Stanisław Malanowicz	04:40
8.	"Hexagony"	Adam Buszko	Adam Buszko, Stanisław Malanowicz	05:25
9.	"Wrists"	Adam Buszko	Adam Buszko, Stanisław Malanowicz	05:05
10.	"Luminous Horizon"	Adam Buszko	Adam Buszko, Stanisław Malanowicz	05:57

Bonus Tracks
No.	Title	Length
11.	"Mass Spectrum I"	03:26
12.	"Re-mix Transsubstance"	07:25
13.	"Mass Spectrum II"	04:26
14.	"Re-mix Trinity Moons"	06:55
15.	"The Antichrist Manifestation"	06:04

== Personnel ==
Hate

- Adam "ATF Sinner" Buszko – guitars, vocals
- Konrad "Destroyer" Ramotowski – guitars
- Stanisław "Hexen" Malanowicz – drums
- Sławomir "Mortifer" Arkhangelsky – bass guitar

Additional musicians

- Piotr "Lestath" Leszczyński – synthesizer
- Michał Staczkun – samples
- Krzysztof "Kris" Wawrzak – samples

=== Production ===
- Adam "ATF Sinner" Buszko – producer
- Krzysztof "Kris" Wawrzak – sound engineering, producer
- Wojciech i Sławomir Wiesławscy – sound engineering, mixing, mastering
- Hi-Ress Studio – cover art and layout, photography
