= Holy Dead Trinity =

Compilation album by Hate
- Released: 10 April 2001
- Recorded: November 1997 – September 1998
- Genre: Death metal; blackened death metal
- Length: 39:21
- Label: World War III
- Producer: Hate; Andrzej Bomba

Hate chronology
Evil Decade of Hate (1999)	Holy Dead Trinity (2001)	Cain's Way (2001)

Holy Dead Trinity is a compilation album by the Polish death metal band Hate. Tracks 1–5 were recorded and mixed at Selani Studio, Olsztyn in September 1998. Tracks 6–14 were recorded in the same studio in November 1997.

== Track listing ==
All tracks are written by Adam Buszko, Ralph, Daniel, and Piotr Kozieradzki, except where noted.

No.	Title	Writer(s)	Length
1.	"Holy Dead Trinity"		3:33
2.	"No Life After Death"		3:17
3.	"Victims"		3:16
4.	"God Overslept"		3:11
5.	"The Kill" (Napalm Death cover)	Nicholas Bullen, Justin Broadrick, Mick Harris	0:19
6.	"Share Your Blood with Daemon"		3:03
7.	"World Has to Die"		3:29
8.	"Dead and Mystified"		3:36
9.	"Enter the Hell" (Instrumental)	Buszko	0:46
10.	"Convocation"		2:55
11.	"Lord Is Avenger"		2:42
12.	"Paradise as Lost"		3:38
13.	"Pagan Triumph" (Instrumental)	Buszko	1:36
14.	"Satan's Horde"		4:00
Total length:			39:21

== Personnel ==
Hate

- Adam "ATF Sinner" Buszko – vocals, rhythm guitar, symphonic tracks, producer
- Ralph – lead guitar
- Cyprian Konador – bass guitar (tracks 1 to 5)
- Daniel – bass guitar (tracks 6 to 14)
- Piotr "Mittloff" Kozieradzki – drums

Additional

- Andrzej Bomba – producer, mixing, engineer
- Kris Wawrzak – remastering
- Maciej Bielawski – engineer (symphonic tracks)
- Piotr Madziar – mastering (tracks 1 to 5)
- Jacek Gawlowski – mastering (tracks 6 to 14)
