= Cain's Way =

Cain's Way may refer to:

- Cain's Cutthroats, or Cain's Way, a 1971 western-themed exploitation film
- Cain's Way (album), an album by the Polish death metal band Hate
