= Solarflesh – A Gospel of Radiant Divinity =

Studio album by Hate
- Released: 4 February 2013
- Recorded: June–July 2012
- Genre: Blackened death metal
- Length: 47:39 (Original release); 61:10 (Limited Edition)
- Label: Napalm Records
- Producer: Adam "ATF Sinner" Buszko

Hate chronology
Erebos (2010)	Solarflesh – A Gospel of Radiant Divinity (2013)	Crusade:Zero (2015)

Solarflesh – A Gospel of Radiant Divinity is the eighth studio album by the Polish death metal band Hate. The follow-up to 2010's "Erebos" was recorded at Sound Division Studio in Warsaw with Filip "Heinrich" Hałucha (Vesania, Decapitated) and Arek "Malta" Malczewski (Behemoth's sound engineer). The CD was mixed at Hertz Studio in Bialystok, Poland with producers Wiesławscy Brothers.

== Track list ==
No.	Title	Lyrics	Music	Length
1.	"Watchful Eye ov Doom" (instrumental)		Adam Buszko	3:20
2.	"Eternal Might"	Adam Buszko	Adam Buszko	6:08
3.	"Alchemy ov Blood"	Adam Buszko	Adam Buszko, Stanisław Malanowicz	4:58
4.	"Timeless Kingdom"	Adam Buszko	Adam Buszko, Stanisław Malanowicz	5:31
5.	"Festival ov Slaves"	Adam Buszko	Adam Buszko	4:34
6.	"Sadness will Last Forever"	Adam Buszko	Adam Buszko, Stanisław Malanowicz	7:05
7.	"Solarflesh"	Adam Buszko	Adam Buszko	5:35
8.	"Endless Purity"	Konrad Ramotowski	Konrad Ramotowski, Stanisław Malanowicz	5:43
9.	"Mesmerized"	Adam Buszko	Adam Buszko	4:56

Bonus Tracks
No.	Title	Lyrics	Music	Length
10.	"Hatehammer"	Adam Buszko	Adam Buszko	4:07
11.	"Venom"	Adam Buszko	Adam Buszko	4:15
12.	"Fall ov All Icons"	Adam Buszko	Adam Buszko	5:09

== Reception ==
Professional ratings
Review scores
Source	Rating
Revolver Magazine	4/5 stars
Metal Force	8.5/10 stars
Metal Hammer	7/10
Exclaim!	favorable

The album received mixed to positive reviews. Writing for Revolver Magazine, Greg Pratt said that on Solarflesh, Hate "nailed the best of modern no-frills death metal" and that "With a production that’s pristine but not overdone, this album is the moment Hate have been working towards all these years", giving the album a 4/5. Madam X's review on Angry Metal Guy was more critical of the album, giving it 2.5/5 and concluding that "I’m hoping Solarflesh ends up being a grower. ATF Sinner’s vocal style is just as big, hostile and euphorically brutal now as back in 2010, and once cranked up full-ball, I already enjoy Solarflesh more than I did the first few times I spun it. Right now though, I don’t find the album that different to what Hate (and their Polish counterparts) have put out before and added to that the watered down sound there’s nothing driving me to pick Solarflesh over Hate’s Erebos masterpiece." Metal Hammer gave the album a positive review, awarding it 7/10 and writing that "They sound particularly sinister this time out, and the flavour suits them."

== Personnel ==
Personnel adapted from Allmusic.

Hate

- Adam "ATF Sinner" Buszko – guitars, vocals, soundscapes, samples, production
- Konrad "Destroyer" Ramotowski – guitars
- Stanislaw "Hexen" Malanowicz – drums
- Sławomir "Mortifer" Arkhangelsky – bass guitar

Additional musicians

- Mateusz Szemraj – oud on 'Solarflesh', lead guitar on 'Sadness Will Last Forever
- Androniki Skoula – backing vocals on 'Watchful Eye ov Doom' and 'Mesmerized'

Production

- Daniel Rusiłowicz – artwork, cover art, layout, photography
- Sławek & Wojtek Wiesławscy – mixing, mastering
- Filip "Heinrich" Hałucha – engineering, bass guitar on 'Endless Purity'
- Arkadiusz "Malta" Malczewski – engineering assistant
- Michał Staczkun – engineering, soundscapes, samples
- Christos Antonio – engineering

Note

- Recorded at Sound Division Studio, June/July 2012, Warsaw, Poland.
- Mixed & mastered at Hertz, August 2012, Bialystok, Poland.
- Background female vocals in tracks 1 and 9 engineered at Devasoundz Studio, Athens.
