= Awakening of the Liar =

Studio album by Hate
- Released: 4 March 2003
- Recorded: October – November 2002
- Genre: Death metal; blackened death metal
- Length: 31:40
- Label: Listenable; Empire; Mercenary Music

Hate chronology
Cain's Way (2001)	Awakening of the Liar (2003)	Anaclasis – A Haunting Gospel of Malice & Hatred (2005)

Alternative cover
- Alternative cover used for the copies distributed in the United States.

Professional ratings
Review scores
Source	Rating
Rock Hard	7.5/10

Awakening of the Liar is the fourth album by the Polish death metal band Hate. It was recorded at Hard Studio in Warsaw and Hertz Studio Białystok between October and November 2002. The material was engineered by Kris Wawrzak at Hard Studio and the Wiesławski Brothers at Hertz Studio. The Wiesławski Brothers also did the mixing and mastering at Hertz Studio, January 2003.

== Track listing ==
No.	Title	Lyrics	Music	Length
1.	"Flagellation"	Adam Buszko	Adam Buszko, Dariusz Zaborowski	2:40
2.	"Anti-God Extremity"	Adam Buszko	Adam Buszko, Dariusz Zaborowski	2:42
3.	"Close to the Nephilim"	Adam Buszko	Adam Buszko	4:19
4.	"Immolate the Pope"	Adam Buszko	Adam Buszko, Dariusz Zaborowski	3:48
5.	"The Shroud (A Hellish Value)"	Adam Buszko	Adam Buszko	2:55
6.	"The Scrolls"	Adam Buszko	Adam Buszko	4:16
7.	"Awakening of the Liar"	Adam Buszko	Adam Buszko	3:36
8.	"Serve God, Rely on Me (Hymn of Asa'el)"	Adam Buszko	Adam Buszko	2:44
9.	"Grail in the Flesh" (Instrumental)		Adam Buszko	1:44
10.	"Spirit of Gospa"	Adam Buszko	Adam Buszko, Dariusz Zaborowski	2:56

== Personnel ==
Hate

- Adam "Adam The First Sinner" Buszko - vocals, guitars
- Piotr "Kaos" Jeziorski - guitars
- Cyprian Konador - bass guitar
- Dariusz "Hellrizer" Zaborowski - drums

Production

- Wojciech & Sławomir Wiesławscy - mixing, mastering, sound engineering
- Krzysztof "Kris" Wawrzak - sound engineering
- Paweł "Blitz" Rosłon - photos
- Artur Szolc, - artwork concept
- Tomasz "Graal" Daniłowicz - graphic design

Note

- Recorded at Hard Studio, Warsaw & Hertz Studio, Białystok, October/November 2002.
