= Morphosis (Hate album) =

Studio album by Hate
- Released: 4 February 2008
- Recorded: 3 August 2007, Hertz Studio in Białystok, Poland
- Genre: Death metal Blackened death metal
- Length: 38:52
- Label: Listenable

Hate chronology
Anaclasis – A Haunting Gospel of Malice & Hatred (2005)	Morphosis (2008)	Erebos (2010)

Professional ratings
Review scores
Source	Rating
Teraz Rock	4/5 stars

Morphosis is the sixth album by Polish death metal band Hate. This album is mostly a death metal release, with some blackened death metal and Industrial influences. The album was mixed by the Wiesławski Bros. in August 2007 at the Hertz studio in Poland and mastered by Kris Wawrzak and Adam The First Sinner at Efektura Studio in Warsaw, October 2007. The album was originally released under Listenable Records, but was released in Brazil under by Paranoid Records in June 2008. The recording took place in two studios in Poland; mainly at Hertz Studio, but also at Efectura Studio. All songs were written and arranged by Adam The First Sinner with assistance of Hexen, except the song Immum Coeli (Everlasting World) which was written by the assistance of both Hexen and Destroyer.

== Track listing ==
No.	Title	Lyrics	Music	Length
1.	"Metamorphosis" (instrumental)		ATF Sinner, Hexen	0:30
2.	"Threnody"	ATF Sinner	ATF Sinner, Hexen	5:53
3.	"Immum Coeli (Everlasting World)"	ATF Sinner	ATF Sinner, Hexen, Destroyer	4:47
4.	"Catharsis"	ATF Sinner	ATF Sinner, Hexen	5:31
5.	"Resurrection Machine"	ATF Sinner	ATF Sinner, Hexen	6:19
6.	"The Evangelistic Pain"	ATF Sinner	ATF Sinner, Hexen	4:24
7.	"Omega"	ATF Sinner	ATF Sinner, Hexen	5:39
8.	"Erased"	ATF Sinner	ATF Sinner, Hexen	5:47

== Personnel ==
=== Hate ===
- Adam "ATF Sinner" Buszko – vocals, guitars, bass, synthesizers, producer, mastering
- Konrad "Destroyer" Ramotowski – guitars
- Stanislaw "Hexen" Malanowicz – drums

=== Production ===
- Wojciech & Sławomir Wiesłąscy – mixing, sound engineering
- Artur Sochan – photography
- Krzysztof "Kris" Wawrzak – co-producer, mastering
- Sven – layout, graphic designs

Recording

- Recorded at Hertz Studio, Bialystok, August 2007.
- Mastered at Efektura Studio, Warsaw, October 2007.
