= Broadzilla =

American heavy rock band

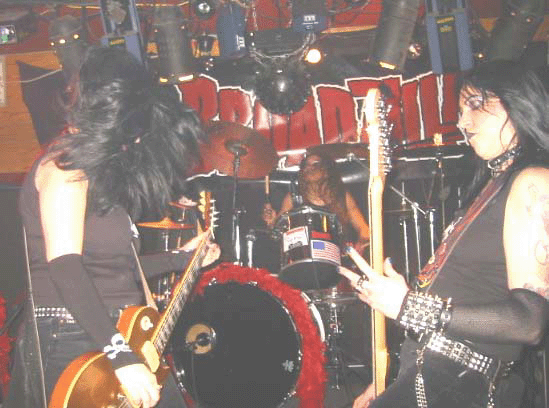
- Broadzilla, 2003 (L-R: Rachel May, Angie Manly, Kim Essiambre)

Background information
- Genres: Hard rock, heavy metal
- Members: Rachel May; Kim Essiambre; Angie Manly
- Past members: Marlene Hammerle; Jen Moffitt; Michelle Chapman; Melody Baetens

Broadzilla are a hard rock band from Detroit, Michigan. They have released two CDs, two EPs, and have won nine Detroit Music Awards. The band consists of Rachel May, Kim Essiambre, and Angie Manly.

== Biography ==
Broadzilla was formed as an all-female metal/punk band in 1996, by Detroit singer/guitarist Rachel May. The original lineup also consisted of bassist Michelle Chapman (then known as Michelle Fields), guitarist Marlene Hammerle, and drummer Jen Moffitt. This lineup released the four-song self-titled EP Broadzilla on cassette only in 1996. Drummer Angie Manly joined in 1997.

By 1999, shortly before the release of the band's first full-length album, the second guitarist spot was occupied by Melody Baetens (under the stage name Melody Licious). The band released the CD Broadzilla vs. the Tramp-o-Lean in October 1999. The album featured a cover of "No More Fun" by the band Feisty Cadavers. Melody Licious was pictured on the album and credited with guitar and backing vocals, but in reality she only contributed backing vocals to the track "Cum Guzzlin Whore."

Bassist Kim Essiambre joined in early 2000. A short time later, Baetens departed and was not replaced. Baetens later joined the Detroit glam band the Sirens, and also turned up in the Detroit garage punk band Gore Gore Girls, as did another former Broadzilla guitarist, Marlene Hammerle.

In April 2001, Broadzilla won their first of nine Detroit Music Awards for best hard rock/heavy metal artist. Their second album Lady Luck was released in October 2001. To date, the album has sold more than 20.000 copies. Included on the album were the lead track "Ecstasy" for which a full music video was produced, a cover of the 1968 song "Love Child" by Diana Ross and the Supremes, and two remixes of the original track "Liquor Snatch" by Detroit techno DJ Sean Deason.

In August 2003, Broadzilla toured England for the first time. Two more British tours followed in fall 2003 and summer 2004 (the two summer tours included high-profile appearances at the annual Bulldog Bash music festival). Broadzilla continued winning regularly at the Detroit Music Awards, picking up additional trophies for best hard rock/heavy metal artist in 2002, 2003, 2005, 2006, and 2007 (they were not eligible in 2004).

== Discography ==
- Broadzilla (EP, 1996)
- Broadzilla vs. the Tramp-o-Lean (1999)
- Lady Luck (2001)
- Broadzilla - B4 Records Song of the Month (EP, 2002)
- Broadzilla - Demo(n)s (EP, 2012)

== See also ==
- All-Female Bands
- List of All-Women Bands
