= Bellum Regiis =

Studio album by Hate
- Released: 2 May 2025
- Length: 46:12
- Label: Metal Blade

Hate chronology
Rugia (2021)	Bellum Regiis (2025)

Bellum Regiis is the thirteenth studio album by Polish blackened death metal band Hate. It was released on 2 May 2025, by Metal Blade Records.

== Background ==
Preceded by Rugia in 2021, Bellum Regiis consists of nine songs ranging between four to six minutes each, except "Rite of Triglav", which has a runtime of one minute and thirty-six seconds. The album's total runtime is approximately forty-six minutes.

ATF Sinner explained in an interview with Metaltalk:

"lyrically a more humanity-focused and personal album than Rugia. The Bellum Regiis songs are a timely aural and visual exploration of a struggle for power and everything that comes with it."

The albums main theme focuses on the concept of struggle for power, along with concepts of nature, humanity, and mythology. The name Bellum Regiis translated means "A War of Royalty" or "A War of Kings".

== Recording & Composition ==
ATF Sinner came up with the main ideas and arrangements of the songs, and then worked with drummer Daniel "Nari-Sil" Rutkowski to complete the main forms. After that, bassist Tomasz "Tiermes" Sadlak, and lead guitarist Domin helped in the final writing process. Recording of the album took place in Stockholm, Sweden at Ghost Ward studio, and other parts were recorded in Poland. Producer and sound engineer, David Castillo, oversaw the production. Vocalist, Eliza Sacharczuk, provided backing vocals. Michał Staczkun provided the orchestrations, and background sounds. The artwork was created by Daniel Rusiłowicz whom has worked with the band since the 2010 album Erebos.

== Reception ==
Professional ratings
Review scores
Source	Rating
Blabbermouth	8.5/10
Distorted Sound	7/10 stars
Metal Hammer	7/10 stars
New Noise	4/5 stars

Edwin McFee of Metal Hammer rated the album seven out of ten and remarked, "A thrilling, sometimes chilling listen, Bellum Regiis reaffirms Hate's status as extreme metal royalty." Distorted Sound, also rating the album seven out of ten, noted, "Arguably some tracks could be streamlined but the overall product, particularly towards the latter stages, is as devastating as ever." Blabbermouth assigned the album a rating of 8.5 out of ten, describing it as one of Hate's "finest records to date." New Noise Magazine gave the album four stars and described its production as "massive as well, dense yet impeccably balanced, giving everything plenty of room to breathe and spread out evenly in order to create a truly imposing wall of sound."

== Track listing ==
Bellum Regiis track listing
No.	Title	Length
1.	"Bellum Regiis"	6:43
2.	"Iphigenia"	6:01
3.	"The Vanguard"	6:00
4.	"A Ghost of Lost Delight"	6:33
5.	"Rite of Triglav"	1:36
6.	"Perun Rising"	5:15
7.	"Alfa Inferi Goddess of War"	4:30
8.	"Prophet of Arkhen"	4:41
9.	"Ageless Harp of Devilry"	4:53
Total length:		46:12

== Charts ==
Chart performance for Bellum Regiis
Chart (2025)	Peak position
French Rock & Metal Albums (SNEP)	76
Polish Albums (ZPAV)	41
