= Anaclasis – A Haunting Gospel of Malice & Hatred =

Anaclasis - A Haunting Gospel Of Malice & Hatred

Studio album by Hate
- Released: 25 October 2005
- Recorded: June – July, 2005; Hertz Studio in Białystok, Poland
- Genre: Death metal; blackened death metal
- Length: 35:57
- Label: Listenable
- Producer: Adam Buszko

Hate chronology
| Awakening of the Liar (2003) | Anaclasis - A Haunting Gospel Of Malice & Hatred (2005) | Morphosis (2008) |

Professional ratings
Review scores
| Source | Rating |
|---|---|
| Blabbermouth.net | 7.5/10 stars |
| Chronicles of Chaos | 5/10 stars |

Anaclasis - A Haunting Gospel Of Malice & Hatred is the fifth album by the Polish death metal band Hate. It was recorded at Hertz Studio, Białystok, Poland during June and July 2005. And was engineered and mixed by Sławek & Wojtek Wiesławski.

== Track listing ==
| No. | Title | Lyrics | Music | Length |
|---|---|---|---|---|
| 1. | "Anaclasis" | Adam Buszko | Adam Buszko | 4:48 |
| 2. | "Necropolis" | Adam Buszko | Adam Buszko | 3:42 |
| 3. | "Hex" | Adam Buszko | Adam Buszko, Dariusz Zaborowski | 4:05 |
| 4. | "Malediction" | Adam Buszko | Adam Buszko, Dariusz Zaborowski, Piotr Jeziorski | 4:18 |
| 5. | "Euphoria of the New Breed" | Adam Buszko | Adam Buszko | 4:09 |
| 6. | "Razorblade" | Adam Buszko | Adam Buszko | 3:20 |
| 7. | "Immortality" | Adam Buszko | Adam Buszko, Dariusz Zaborowski | 4:43 |
| 8. | "Fountains of Blood to Reach Heavens" | Adam Buszko | Adam Buszko | 6:52 |

== Personnel ==
Hate

- Adam "Adam The First Sinner" Buszko - vocals, guitars, samples, synths, producer
- Cyprian Konador - bass guitar
- Dariusz "Hellrizer" Zaborowski - drums

Production

- Krzysztof "Kris" Wawrzak - engineering, co-producer
- Wojciech & Sławomir Wiesłąscy - mixing, mastering, engineering
- Tomasz "Graal" Daniłowicz - layout, design
- Dominik Czerski - photos
- Tomasz Ślęzak - photos

Note

- Recorded at Hertz Studio, Białystok, Poland during June and July 2005.
