= Crusade:Zero =

Studio album by Hate
- Released: 25 January 2015
- Recorded: Hertz Studio, Poland
- Genre: Blackened death metal
- Length: 50:42
- Label: Napalm Records
- Producer: Wojtek and Sławek Wiesławski

Hate chronology
Solarflesh – A Gospel of Radiant Divinity (2013)	Crusade:Zero (2015)	Tremendum (2017)

Singles from Crusade:Zero
- 1. "Valley of Darkness" Released: 8 January 2015

Professional ratings
Review scores
Source	Rating
Metal Blast	2/5 stars
MetalSucks	2.5/5 stars

Crusade:Zero is the ninth studio album by the Polish death metal band Hate. It was released on 25 January 2015 in Europe and 10 February in the United States and Canada. It was produced by the Wieslawski Brothers and was recorded and mixed at Hertz Studio, Poland. It is the first album to feature drummer Paweł "Pavulon" Jaroszewicz.

A music video for the song "Valley of Darkness" was released on 8 January 2015.

== Track list ==
No.	Title	Length
1.	"Vox Dei (A Call from Beyond)"	1:36
2.	"Lord, Make Me an Instrument of Thy Wrath!"	1:41
3.	"Death Liberator"	6:00
4.	"Leviathan"	6:25
5.	"Doomsday Celebrities"	4:21
6.	"Hate Is the Law"	5:27
7.	"Valley of Darkness"	6:11
8.	"Crusade:Zero"	4:29
9.	"The Omnipresence"	1:02
10.	"Rise Omega the Consequence!"	5:35
11.	"Dawn of War"	6:03
12.	"Black Aura Debris"	1:52
Total length:		50:42

Bonus tracks
No.	Title	Length
13.	"The Reaping"	5:17
Total length:		55:59

== Personnel ==
Hate

- Adam "ATF Sinner" Buszko – vocals, guitars, bass
- Konrad "Destroyer" Ramotowski – guitars
- Paweł "Pavulon" Jaroszewicz – drums

Production

- Daniel Rusiłowicz – cover art
- Sławek & Wojtek Wiesławski – production, mixing, mastering, engineering
- Michał Staczkun – engineering, soundscapes, samples
