= Distractive Killusions =

Studio album by Vesania
- Released: 20 November 2007 (North America); 28 November 2007 (Finland); 30 November 2007 (Germany, Austria, Switzerland, Sweden); 3 December 2007 (rest of Europe (excl. Poland))
- Recorded: February 2007; X Studio in Olsztyn, Poland
- Genre: Symphonic black metal, blackened death metal
- Length: 42:57; 51:48 (Digipak)
- Label: Napalm, Mystic
- Producer: Orion, Szymon Czech

Vesania chronology
God the Lux (2005)	Distractive Killusions (2007)	Rage of Reason (2008)

Professional ratings
Review scores
Source	Rating
About.com	3.5/5 stars
Blabbermouth.net	8/10 stars
Chronicles of Chaos	7/10 stars

Distractive Killusions is the third full-length album by Polish symphonic black metal band Vesania. It was recorded at Studio X in Olsztyn, Poland by Szymon Czech and Vesania. The record was mixed and mastered at Studio X by Szymon Czech and Orion with virtual assisitance of Siegmar. The album was released worldwide in November 2007. A limited edition digipak version was also released, containing two bonus tracks. This is the first album with Valeo as a real band member. The album was originally released under Napalm Records but was released under Mystic Production in Poland.

Orion commented after the release of Distractive Killusions:

We're proudly announcing the release of 'Distractive Killusions'! It's out now in stores. This time, beside the regular release of the album, we've prepared limited edition as well. For all those, who are willing to have a collectable item, there's a digi-pack version with two bonus tracks available. The extra songs on this one are: the single edit of 'Rage Of Reason' and the cover song of Bulldozer, 'Neurodeliri'. Make your choice and pick your copy!

— Orion

== Track listing ==
All music by Vesania, except "Neurodeliri" by Bulldozer. Arranged by Orion, Daray and Siegmar.

No.	Title	Lyrics	Length
1.	"Narrenschyff"	Orion	5:58
2.	"The Dawnfall (Hamartia and Hybris)"	Orion	4:55
3.	"Infinity Horizon"	Orion	4:47
4.	"Rage of Reason"	Orion	5:52
5.	"Of Bitterness and Clarity"	Orion	4:40
6.	"Silence Makes Noise (Eternity – The Mood)"	Orion, T. Wroczynski	4:47
7.	"Hell is for Children"	Orion	4:57
8.	"Aesthesis"	Orion	5:04
9.	"Distractive Cryscendo"	Orion	1:57

Digipak bonus tracks

No.	Title	Lyrics	Length
10.	"Rage of Reason" (single edit)	Orion	4:01
11.	"Neurodeliri" (Bulldozer cover)	Orion	4:50

== Personnel ==
- Tomasz "Orion" Wróblewski – guitars, vocals
- Dariusz "Daray" Brzozowski – drums and percussion
- Krzysztof "Siegmar" Oloś – keyboard, additional guitars
- Filip "Heinrich" Hałucha – bass guitar
- Marcin "Valeo" Walenczykowski – guitars
- Piotr Gibner – vocals on Infinity Horizon
- Szymon Czech – engineering, mix, mastering
- Krzysztof "Sado" Sadowski – photography, cover concept
- Tanzteufel – cover design and artwork
