= Firefrost Arcanum =

Album by Vesania

Studio album by Vesania
- Released: 23 March 2003
- Recorded: Winter 2001 – Summer 2002
- Genre: Symphonic black metal
- Length: 51:34
- Label: Empire; Crash Music
- Producer: Vesania; Szymonaz Czech

Vesania chronology
Moonastray (2002)	Firefrost Arcanum (2003)	God the Lux (2005)

Professional ratings
Review scores
Source	Rating
AllMusic	2.5/5 stars

Firefrost Arcanum is the first full-length album released by the Polish symphonic black metal band Vesania. It was recorded, remixed and mastered at different times between the Winter of 2001 and the Summer of 2002 at Selani Studio in Olsztyn, Poland. It was released in 2003 through Crash Music and Empire Records.

== Track listing ==
1. "Path 1. Mystherion. Crystaleyes" – 5:31
2. "Path 2. Introit Algor" – 0:35
3. "Path 3. Nova Persei" – 8:46
4. "Path 4. Algorfocus Nefas" – 2:42
5. "Path 5. Marduke's Mazemerising" – 4:39
6. "Path 6. Moonthrone. Dawn Broken" – 9:38
7. "Path 7. Introit Focus" – 0:39
8. "Path 8. Daemoonion Act II" – 8:45
9. "Path 9. Introit Nefas" – 0:40
10. "Path 10. Dukedoom Black" – 9:39

=== Notes ===
Note that Path 2. Introit Algor, Path 4. Algorfocus Nefas, Path 7. Introit Focus and Path 9: Introit Nefas are all interlude tracks, and thus contain no lyrics.

== Personnel ==
- Tomasz "Orion" Wróblewski – guitars, vocals
- Dariusz "Daray" Brzozowski – drums and percussion
- Filip "Heinrich" Hałucha – bass guitar
- Krzysztof "Siegmar" Oloś – keyboard
- Filip "Annahvahr" Żołyński – guitars
- Szymon "Szymonaz" Czech – co–producer
- Krzysztof "Sado" Sadowski – photography
