= Cain's Way (album) =

Studio album by Hate
- Released: 2001 (POL); 23 July 2002 (US)
- Recorded: Serakos Studio, 2001
- Genre: Death metal Blackened death metal
- Length: 35:38
- Label: Apocalypse Productions/Koch, WWIII, Candlelight, AMC American Music

Hate chronology
| Holy Dead Trinity (2001) | Cain's Way (2001) | Awakening of the Liar (2003) |

Alternative cover
- Alternative cover.

Professional ratings
Review scores
| Source | Rating |
|---|---|
| Chronicles of Chaos | 5.5/10 stars |
| Teraz Rock | 3/5 stars |
| Exclaim! | favorable |

Cain's Way is the third album by the Polish death metal band Hate. It was recorded at Serakos Studio in 2001. The album was released in Poland under Apocalypse Productions/Koch International in 2001.

== Track listing ==
| No. | Title | Lyrics | Music | Length |
|---|---|---|---|---|
| 1. | "Apocalypse" | ATF Sinner | ATF Sinner, Ralph | 3:34 |
| 2. | "...And the Sin Becomes" | ATF Sinner | ATF Sinner, Ralph | 3:49 |
| 3. | "Sectarian Murder" | ATF Sinner | ATF Sinner, Ralph | 3:35 |
| 4. | "The Fifth Eternally Despised" (instrumental) | | ATF Sinner, Ralph | 0:38 |
| 5. | "Through Hate to Eternity" | ATF Sinner | ATF Sinner, Ralph | 3:36 |
| 6. | "Shame of the Creator" | ATF Sinner | ATF Sinner, Ralph | 4:23 |
| 7. | "Resurrected But Failed" | ATF Sinner | ATF Sinner, Ralph | 4:08 |
| 8. | "Cain's Way" | ATF Sinner | ATF Sinner, Ralph | 3:31 |
| 9. | "Holy Dead Trinity" | ATF Sinner | ATF Sinner, Ralph | 3:16 |
| 10. | "Future Is Mayhem" | ATF Sinner | ATF Sinner, Ralph | 3:18 |
| 11. | "From Cain to Cadmon" (instrumental) | | ATF Sinner, Ralph | 1:50 |
| Total length: | | | | 35:38 |

== Personnel ==
Hate

- Adam "ATF Sinner" Buszko - guitars, vocals
- Piotr "Kaos" Jeziorski - guitars
- Cyprian Konador - bass guitar
- Piotr "Mittloff" Kozieradzki - drums

Production

- Robert Srzednicki - mixing, mastering, producer, engineering
- Paweł "Blitz" Roslon - photos

Note

- Recorded at Serakos Studio, Warsaw 2001.
