= God the Lux =

Studio album by Vesania
- Released: 25 April 2005
- Recorded: September 2004 – January 2005
- Genre: Symphonic black metal
- Length: 66:03 (Polish version)
- Label: Empire / Napalm

Vesania chronology
| Firefrost Arcanum (2003) | God the Lux (2005) | Distractive Killusions (2007) |

Alternative cover
- Empire Records cover

Professional ratings
Review scores
| Source | Rating |
|---|---|
| AllMusic | 2.5/5 stars |

God the Lux is the second full-length album by Polish symphonic black metal band Vesania. It was released on 25 April 2005 through Napalm Records. It was recorded in various points of time between September 2004 and January 2005. The drums, guitars and vocals were recorded at the Hendrix Studio in Lublin and engineered by Arkadiusz "Malta" Malczewski. Recordings for the bass guitar took place at the Kokszoman Studio in Warsaw and were engineered by Marecki and the keyboards were recorded at Siegmar's home studio by himself.

The recordings were mixed and mastered in February 2005 in the Hertz Studio in Białystok by Wojciech Wiesławski, Sławomir Wiesławski and Vesania.

== Track listing ==
| No. | Title | Lyrics | Music | Length |
|---|---|---|---|---|
| 1. | "Path I: Rest in Pain" | Orion | Orion | 5:31 |
| 2. | "Path II: Posthuman Kind" | Orion | Orion | 3:37 |
| 3. | "Path III: Lumen Clamosum" | Orion | Siegmar | 1:54 |
| 4. | "Path IV: God the Lux" | Orion | Orion | 4:00 |
| 5. | "Path V: Synchroscheme" | Orion | Orion | 5:21 |
| 6. | "Path VI: Phosphorror" | Orion | Orion | 3:45 |
| 7. | "Path VII: Lumen Funescum" | Orion | Siegmar | 1:31 |
| 8. | "Path VIII: The Mystory" | Orion, Annahvahr | Siegmar, Mauser | 4:54 |
| 9. | "Path IX: Fireclipse" | Orion | Orion | 5:36 |
| 10. | "Path X: Lumen Coruscum" | Orion | Siegmar | 0:30 |
| 11. | "Path XI: Mask Ill" | Orion | Orion |
| 12. | "Path XII: Legions Are Me" | Orion | Orion | 3:25 |
| 13. | "Path XIII: Inlustra Nigror" | Orion | Orion | 25:59 |

== Notes ==
1. Bonus track, not included on the Polish version.

"Inlustra Nigror" has a 24-minute silence, before the track which in itself, is only a minute or so of guitar harmonies.

== Personnel ==
- Tomasz "Orion" Wróblewski – guitars, vocals
- Dariusz "Daray" Brzozowski – drums and percussion
- Filip "Heinrich" Hałucha – bass guitar
- Krzysztof "Siegmar" Oloś – keyboard
- Maurycy "Mauser"Stefanowicz – guitar solo on Path VIII The Mystory
- Arkadiusz "Malta" Malczewski – engineering
- Marecki – engineering
- Krzysztof "Sado" Sadowski – photography, cover concept
- Tanzteufel – cover design and artwork
