= UnSun =

Polish metal band

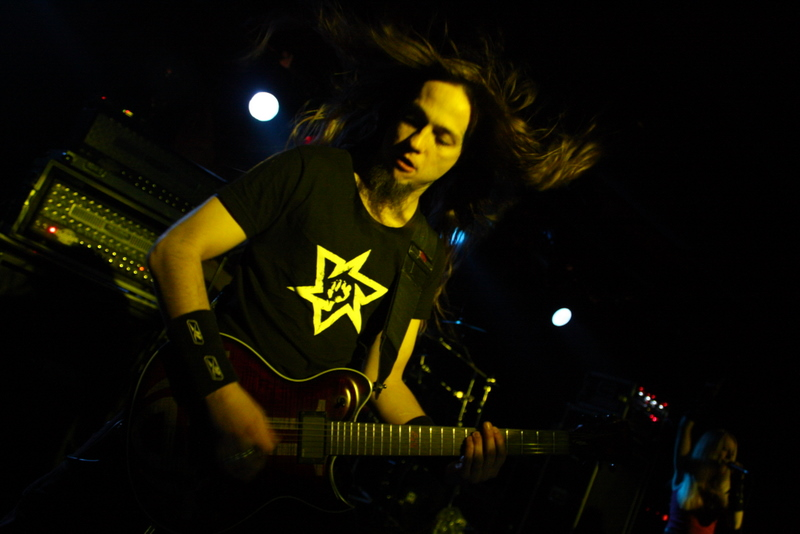
- Maurycy Stefanowicz

Background information
- Also known as: UnSeen
- Origin: Szczytno, Poland
- Genres: Gothic metal; alternative metal
- Years active: 2006–2016
- Labels: Mystic, Century Media
- Members: Anna Stefanowicz; Maurycy Stefanowicz; Patryk Malinowski; Wojtek Blaszkowski
- Past members: Filip Halucha; Wawrzyniec Dramowicz

UnSun was a Polish gothic metal band formed in 2006 by ex-guitarist Maurycy "Mauser" Stefanowicz of death metal band Vader. Their debut album, entitled The End of Life, was released in September 2008 by Century Media Records. Their second album Clinic for Dolls was released in 2010 via Mystic Production. Despite plans to enter the studio in 2015 to record the follow-up to Clinic for Dolls, vocalist Anna "Aya" Stefanowicz's health conditions got worse and prevented her from recording vocal lines. Having seen no improvement, Unsun was forced to disband in February 2016.

== History ==
UnSun was founded by ex-Vader guitarist Mauser and his wife, lead vocalist Anna "Aya" Stefanowicz. Originally named Unseen, they later changed their name to UnSun to reflect their blending of death metal influences and melodic vocals. Mauser and Aya added additional musicians to complete the group. In 2007, the group was signed with Mystic Production.

The band's style has been compared to Lacuna Coil, Nightwish, Evanescence, Within Temptation, and The Gathering.

=== The End of Life (2008) ===
In early 2008, Anna and Maurycy Stefanowicz began writing their first album, The End of Life, which was recorded at Studio-X in 2008. It was released through Century Media Records on 19 September 2008. The album features gothic metal and rock with a "homogenous mix" of hard guitar sound and tender melodies. AllMusic's reviewer noted that the album was far from Vader's death metal and oriented more towards commercial gothic metal. The same year, UnSun performed the Black Sun Tour in Poland with Votum and Black River.

=== Clinic for Dolls (2010) ===
The band's record label, Mystic Production, announced in a press statement on 24 June 2010 that UnSun begun recording its second album Clinic for Dolls, which was scheduled for release on 11 October 2010. According to a press release, the vocal tracks were recorded at Studio X in Olsztyn and all the instruments were laid down at Hertz Studio (Behemoth, Vader, Decapitated) in Bialystok. The cover artwork was created by Hi-Res Studio, which also handled the band's latest photo session. The album was rated as "common gothic metal" by Sonic Seducer while AllMusic's reviewer found elements of J-pop. Metal Hammer Germany wrote also that the album was not as gothic and theatrical as others of its kind. About.com wrote that while the album did not focus as much on symphonic and orchestral parts as other gothic music, it still had "enough unique characteristics".

In October 2010, UnSun supported Tristania on the "Rubicon Tour" in Europe.

Both Filip Halucha and "Vaaver" Dramowicz left the band in 2010.

=== Third album (2011–2015) ===
On 1 April 2014 Anna Stefanowicz posted on Unsun's Facebook page with this direct quote: "Hey guys! Long time no news, so here you go! My vocal cords and condition causing problems with them is really improving, so I can finally sing not only hum. In the meantime, we're still continuously working on the new songs so you can expect new album will be coming out soon. As soon as we finish the songs we'll go to the studio and then we'll be able to give you more accurate release date of our third album. I hope that's sound good enough? Thank you for your constant support. Love you! See you soon. Best Wishes to you all. Aya"

=== Breakup (2016) ===
On 5 February 2016, Anna Stefanowicz posted on UnSun's Facebook page announcing the breakup of the band due to how her vocal cord condition was getting worse. She wrote: "The illness I have is affecting my nervous system and there are a lot of bad things happening to my body at the moment. So now I am just dreaming about being able to walk and move and do things without pain, so forgive me for not dreaming about singing. I am currently waiting for the decision about my possible further treatment and one of the options is surgery in the neck/spine area, and I hope that, the successful surgery would resolve at least half of my problems. It was really hard to admit it but this will also free me somehow, hopefully.. Therefore, we decided to quit the band. Maurycy is still continuing with his writing and music making. He is currently working on his new project/band."

== Band members ==
Current

- Anna "Aya" Stefanowicz (Napiórkowska) – vocals (2006–2016)
- Maurycy "Mauser" Stefanowicz – guitar (2006–2016)
- Patryk "Patrick" Malinowski – bass guitar (2010–2016)
- Wojtek "Gonzo" Blaszkowski – drums (2010–2016)

Former

- Filip "Heinrich" Halucha – bass guitar (2006–2010)
- Wawrzyniec "Vaaver" Dramowicz – drums (2006–2010)

Timeline

== Discography ==
=== Studio albums ===
Title	Album details	Peak chart positions
Title	Album details	JPN
The End of Life	Date: 19 September 2008; Label: Century Media/Mystic; Formats: CD, digital download	143
Clinic for Dolls	Date: 11 October 2010; Label: Mystic/Armoury/Eagle Rock/Avalon/Marquee; Formats: CD, digital download	218
"—" denotes a recording that did not chart or was not released in that territory.

=== Music videos ===
Year	Title	Directed by	Album
2008	"Whispers"	Dariusz Szermanowicz, Grupa 13	The End of Life
2010	"Home"	Mateusz Winkiel, Mania Studio	Clinic for Dolls

== Awards and nominations ==
Year	Award	Result
2009	Metal Female Voices Award	Nominated
