= Rootwater =

Polish nu metal band

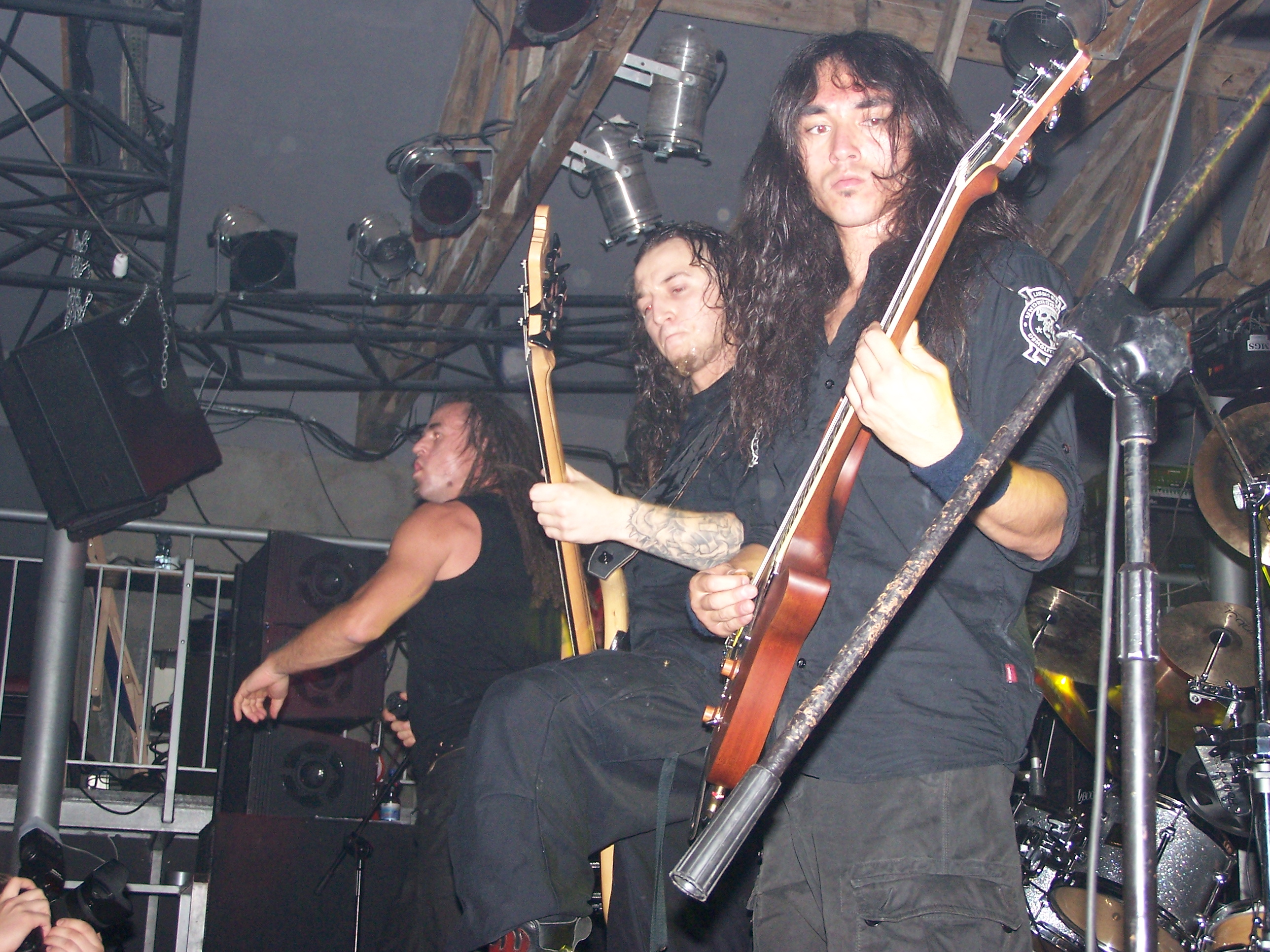
- During concert in Mega Club in Katowice, 2007

Background information
- Origin: Warsaw, Poland
- Genres: Nu metal; thrash metal; alternative metal
- Years active: 2002–2010
- Labels: Fonografika, Mystic Production
- Members: Maciej Taff; Sebastian Zusin; Filip "Heinrich" Hałucha; Marcin "Valeo" Walenczykowski; Grzegorz "Oleynik" Olejnik
- Past members: Paweł "Paul" Jaroszewicz; Tomasz "Yońca" Jońca; Paweł Jurkowski; Przemysław Bieliński; Michał Truong; Artur Rowiński
- Website: rootwater.pl

Rootwater was a Polish nu metal band, formed in Warsaw in 2002 by Sebastian Zusin, Tomasz "Yońca" Jońca and Paweł Jurkowski. Soon, Maciej Taff has joined the band as a vocalist. In their music there are many hardcore, thrash, folk and punk, and even ambient influences clearly audible. The name of the band comes from a Magic: The Gathering card captioned "Rootwater Commando". The band is famous for their psychedelic album covers. Many critics are comparing Rootwater's music to System of a Down's music, which is probably caused by a similar use of native "folkish" melodies by both groups. Rootwater's vocalist, Maciej Taff usually sings in English, but some songs refer to Hebrew (Hava Nagila), or are sung in traditional Roma language (Caje Sukarije), Polish, or French (Climchoque).

== Members ==
Last line-up

- Maciej Taff – vocalist (2002–2010)
- Sebastian Zusin – guitar (2002–2010)
- Filip "Heinrich" Hałucha – bass guitar (2004–2010)
- Marcin "Valeo" Walenczykowski – guitar (2009–2010; died 2018)
- Grzegorz "Gregor" Olejnik – drums (2009–2010)

Former members

- Paweł "Paul" Jaroszewicz – drums (2008)
- Michał Truong – guitar (2004–2009)
- Artur Rowiński – drums (2004–2008)
- Tomasz "Yońca" Jońca – guitar (2002–2004)
- Paweł Jurkowski – drums (2002–2004)
- Przemysław Bieliński – bass guitar (2002–2004)

== Discography ==
=== Studio albums ===
Title	Album details
Under	Released: 27 April 2004; Label: Fonografika; Formats: CD
The Legends of Hava Nagila (EP)	Released: 2006; Label: Fonografika; Formats: CD
Limbic System	Released: 1 March 2007; Label: Mystic Production; Formats: CD, digital download
Visionism	Released: 15 June 2009; Label: Mystic Production; Formats: CD, digital download

=== Music videos ===
Year	Title	Directed	Album
2004	"Hava Nagila"	—	Under
2010	"Living in the Cage"	Mania Studio	Visionism
