= Melody Licious =

American musician

Melody Licious is the former stage name of Detroit born Melody Baetens, a staff writer for The Detroit News since 1999.

She was a member of Detroit rock bands Broadzilla (1999–2000) and Gore Gore Girls (2000–2003). She has also been with Detroit glam band the Sirens since 2001, and has appeared on all of the band's releases, plus a 2005 France tour and a 2006 tour of Serbia. Melody toured South America with the Coronados in 2004. She's currently the bassist for Betty Cooper.

She was the co-host of local music show "Detroit Local 101" on Riff2. An HD Radio side channel of WRIF, Riff2 won a National Association of Broadcasters award in 2007.

In January 2009, Melody became a co-owner of Small's Bar in Hamtramck, MI.

In 2019, Baetens was named The Detroit News' restaurant critic.
