= Hate (band) =

Polish metal band

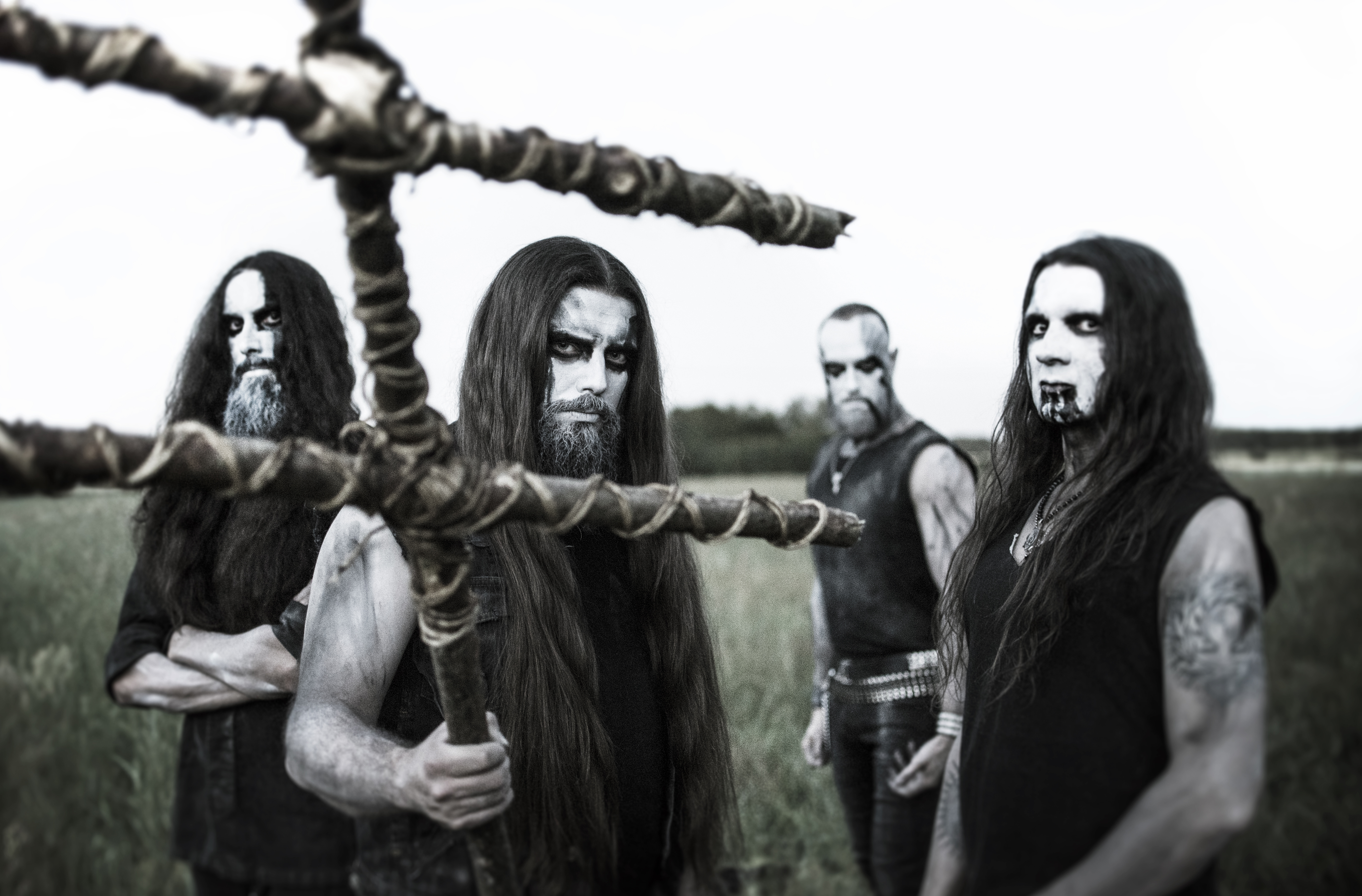
- HATE in 2018. L–R: Apeiron, Pavulon, Domin, ATF Sinner

Background information
- Origin: Warsaw, Poland
- Genres: Blackened death metal; death metal
- Years active: 1990–present
- Labels: Listenable; Metal Mind; Novum Vox Mortiis; WW3/Mercenary Music; Blackend Records; Napalm; Metal Blade
- Members: Adam "Adam the First Sinner" Buszko; Dominik "Domin" Prykiel; Daniel "Nar-Sil" Rutkowski; Tomasz "Tiermes" Sadlak
- Past members: (see below)
- Website: hateofficial.com

Hate is a Polish blackened death metal band. The band was formed in 1990 by guitarist and vocalist Adam "ATF Sinner" Buszko, guitarist Quack and drummer Mittloff. The lineup has changed over the years. They have released thirteen studio albums, and several early demos and EPs. Their most recent album, Bellum Regiis, was released on 2 May 2025 through Metal Blade Records.

== History ==
Vocalist Adam The First Sinner, guitarist Qack, and drummer Mittloff formed Hate in Warsaw, Poland, in 1990. Between 1990 and 1995, the band recorded three demo tapes: Aborrence (1992), Evil Art, which compiles the first two demos (1994), and Unwritten Law (1995). Bassist Daniel Rutkowski first played on Evil Art. In 1996, Hate signed with Novum Vox Mortiis, who released their first two albums, Daemon Qui Fecit Terram (1996) and Lord Is Avenger (1998), in Poland.

In 2000, Hate released the mini-album Victims through Metal Mind Records. Later that year, shows with Immolation drew the attention of American label Dwell Records, who included Hate's cover of "Postmortem" on the compilation Gateways To Hell: Tribute To Slayer (Vol. 2). Hate signed their first record contract outside Poland with WW3/Mercenary Music, who released a compilation of the albums Lord Is Avenger and Victims as Holy Dead Trinity in 2001.

Hate released 2002's Cain's Way on WW3/Mercenary Music in the US, and on Blackend Records in Europe, though several months later. At the time of the European release, guitarist Ralph and drummer Mittloff were replaced with Kaos and Hellrizer, respectively.

In 2004, Hate released Awakening Of The Liar on Listenable Records in Europe and Mercenary Music in the US. The album was a poll winner in Polish magazine Thrash'Em All.

The band recorded Anaclasis – A Haunting Gospel of Malice & Hatred in June and July 2005 at Hertz Studio in Białystok, Poland. The album was released on 25 October 2005 through Empire Records. The album received positive reviews from critics. Blabbermouth wrote that the music "is indicative of a band that has formed an identity. It is well structured, yet not overly technical, and sports a bit more melody and a cleaner guitar sound."

The band entered Hertz Studio in August 2007 to record Morphosis, released on 4 February 2008 through Listenable Records. The album received positive reviews from critics.

The band's seventh full-length album, Erebos, was released on 15 November 2010 through Listenable Records. The album was recorded between July and August 2010 at Hertz Studio. A music video for the title track was directed by Sławomir Makowski and released on 21 October 2011. The band toured the United States in the spring of 2011 with headlining band Sepultura, along with supporting acts Belphegor, Keep of Kalessin, Neuraxis, Bonded by Blood, and Nevermore. In late 2011, the band toured North America with headlining band, Mayhem, alongside supporting acts Keep of Kalessin, and Abigail Williams.

Their eighth full-length album, Solarflesh, was released on 4 February 2013 through Napalm Records. The album was recorded between June–July 2012 at Sound Division Studio in Warsaw, Poland, and mixed at Hertz Studio. The album received generally positive reviews from critics. Revolver Magazine gave it 4/5, writing that the band have "nailed the best of modern no-frills death metal: full-speed blast beats, grimy sludge, and just enough experimentation to keep things interesting, from keyboard flourishes and a sense of drama that borders on ludicrous but still works to Spanish-style guitar intro to the title track."

During the night of 5 April 2013 and the morning of 6 April 2013, bassist Sławomir "Mortifier" Kusterka died in his sleep while on tour near Munchberg, Germany. His bandmates discovered him "lifeless" and called an ambulance, which unsuccessfully attempted to revive him. An autopsy revealed the cause of death as cardiac arrhythmia. They released their ninth album, Crusade: Zero, on 30 January 2015 through Napalm Records. The album was recorded at Efektura Studio in Warsaw, Poland and dedicated to Mortifer.

The band released their tenth album, Tremendum, on 5 May 2017 through Napalm Records. The album was recorded with Adam ATF on guitar/vocals and Pavulon on drums, with session guitars and bass by Dominik Prykiel and Paweł Michałowski, respectively. It features guest guitar solos from Dean Arnold of Vital Remains. The band announced that they would tour Europe through May and June 2017 to support the album.

Hate's eleventh studio album, Auric Gates of Veles, was released on 14 June 2019 through Metal Blade Records. Rugia, was released on 15 October 2021.

Hate supported Belphegor on their US tour in early 2026 along with Incantation. On 8 February 2026, original guitarist Andrzej "Quack" Kułakowski died at the age of 54.

== Logo ==
Since 2008 Hate has used the Omega symbol as part of their image with the release of their album Morphosis. In later albums, since their release of the 2017 Tremendum album, the band has incorporated pagan symbols into their image and merchandise, in particular with the Pagan Unity symbol that represents the bands shift from satanic, anti-Christian lyricism to Slavic mythology, and mysticism.

== Band members ==
Current

- Adam "ATF Sinner" Buszko – vocals, rhythm guitar (1990–present)
- Dominik "Domin" Prykiel – lead guitar (2015–present)
- Tomasz "Tiermes" Sadlak – bass (2018–present)
- Daniel "Nar-Sil" Rutkowski – drums (2020–present)

Past

- Piotr "Mittloff" Kozieradzki – drums (1990–2001)
- Andrzej "Quack" Kułakowski – lead guitar (1990–1994) (died 2026)
- Marcin "Martin" Russak – bass, backing vocals (1990–1992)
- Daniel – bass (1993–1997)
- Ralph – lead guitar (1995–2001)
- Cyprian Konador – bass (1998–2007)
- Dariusz "Hellrizer" Zaborowski – drums (2001–2006)
- Piotr "Kaos" Jeziorski – lead guitar (2002–2005)
- Kamil "Hellbeast" Kondracki – lead guitar (2005–2006)
- Konrad "Destroyer" Ramotowski – lead guitar (2006–2015)
- Stanisław "Hexen" Malanowicz – drums (2006–2014)
- Sławomir "Mortifer" Arkhangelsky – bass (2007–2013) (died 2013)
- Paweł "Pavulon" Jaroszewicz – drums (2014–2020)

Live

- Tomasz "Cyklon" Węglewski – bass (2005)
- Łukasz "Lucas" Musiuk – lead guitar (2005, 2006)
- Alexandra Arkhangelskaya – bass (2013)
- Piotr "Kain" Kołakowski – bass (2013–2016)
- Paweł "Apeiron" Michałowski – bass (2016–2018)

Session

- Filip "Heinrich" Hałucha – bass (2014)

== Discography ==
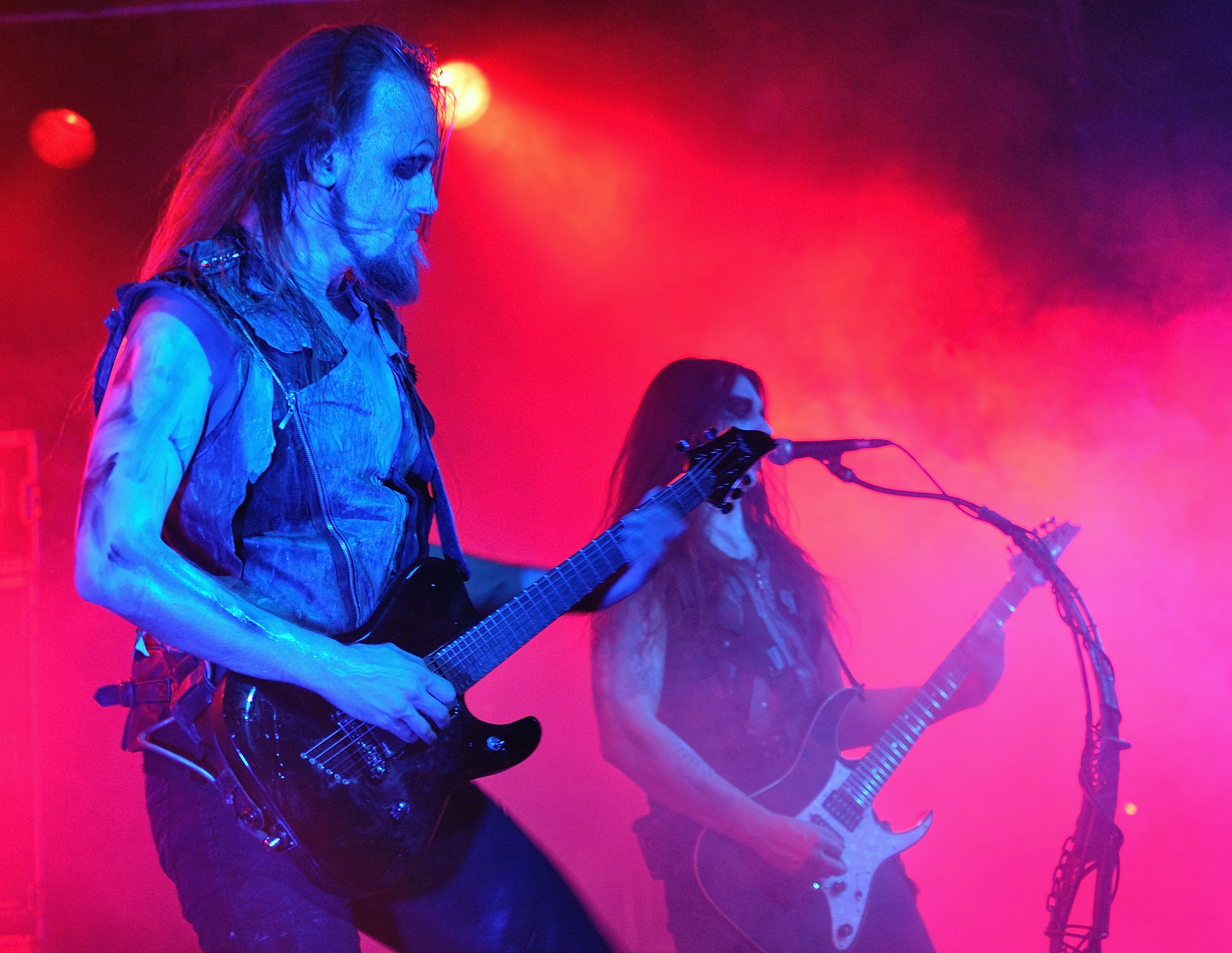
Hate, 2015

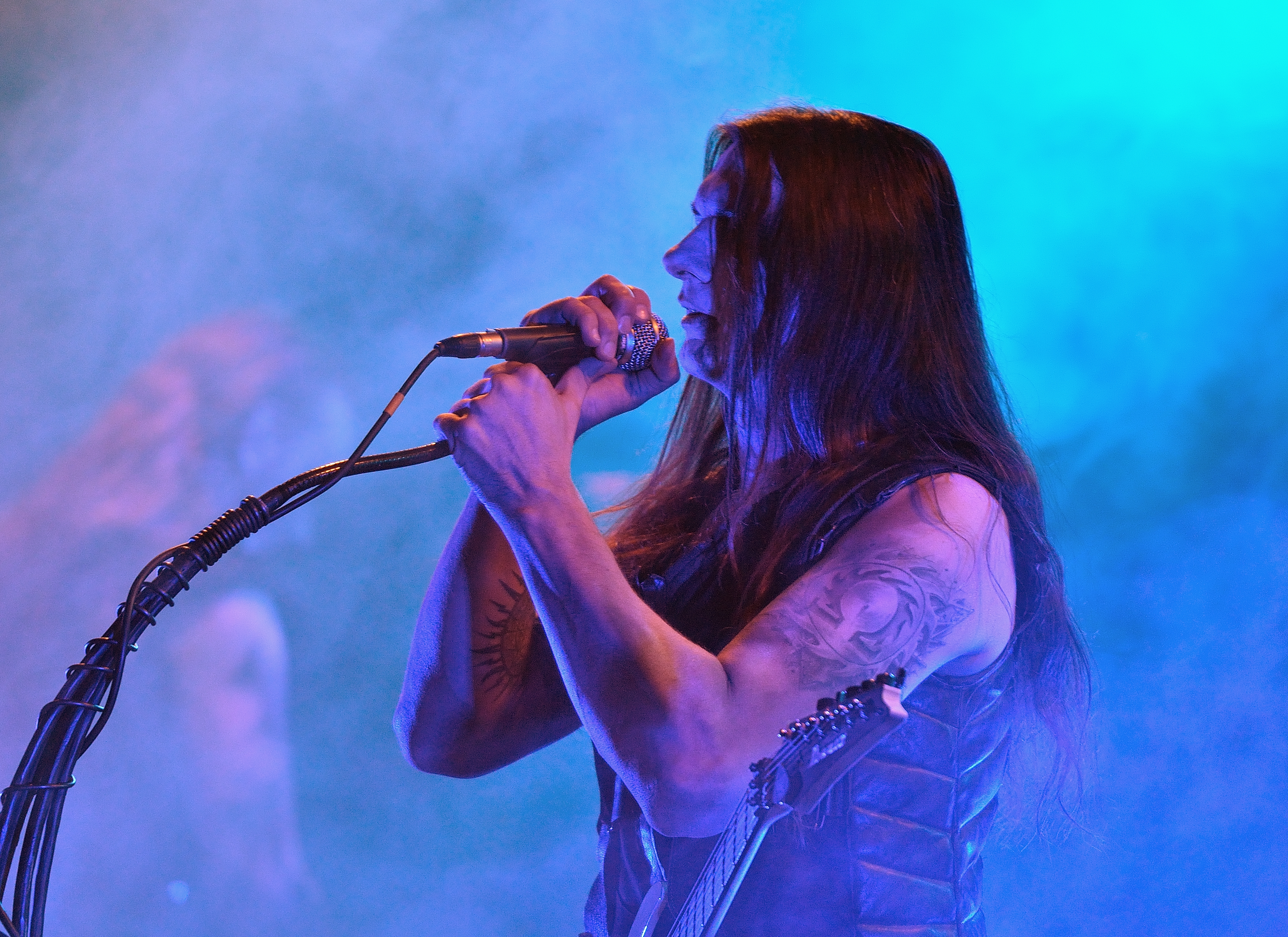
Adam Buszko, 2015

=== Studio albums ===
Title	Album details
Daemon Qui Fecit Terram	Released: 1996; Label: Novum Vox Mortiis; Formats: CD, CS
Lord Is Avenger	Released: 1998; Label: Novum Vox Mortiis; Formats: CD, CS
Cain's Way	Released: 2001; Label: Apocalypse, Blackend, WWIII; Formats: CD, CS
Awakening of the Liar	Released: 4 March 2003; Label: Mercenary Musik, Empire, Listenable; Formats: CD, digital download
Anaclasis – A Haunting Gospel of Malice & Hatred	Released: 25 October 2005; Label: Empire, Listenable; Formats: CD, LP, digital download
Morphosis	Released: 4 February 2008; Label: Listenable; Formats: CD, LP, digital download
Erebos	Released: 15 November 2010; Label: Listenable; Formats: CD, digital download
Solarflesh – A Gospel of Radiant Divinity	Released: 30 January 2013; Label: Napalm; Formats: CD, digital download
Crusade:Zero	Released: 25 January 2015; Label: Napalm; Formats: CD, digital download
Tremendum	Released: 5 May 2017; Label: Napalm; Formats: CD, digital download
Auric Gates of Veles	Released: 14 June 2019; Label: Metal Blade; Formats: CD, digital download
Rugia	Released: 15 October 2021; Label: Metal Blade; Formats: CD, digital download
Bellum Regiis	Released: 2 May 2025; Label: Metal Blade; Formats: CD, digital download, vinyl

=== Compilations ===
Title	Album details	Notes
Evil Decade of Hate	Released: 20 March 2000 (POL); Label: Apocalypse; Formats: CD	
Holy Dead Trinity	Released: 10 April 2001 (US); Label: WWIII; Formats: CD, digital download	Compilation of songs from Victims EP and Lord is Avenger album.

=== EPs ===
Title	EP details	Notes
Victims	Released: 15 June 1999 (POL); Label: Metal Mind Productions; Formats: CD, CS	Re-released on 21 April 2001 as part of Holy Dead Trinity compilation

=== Video albums ===
Title	Video details	Notes
Litanies of Satan	Released: 28 June 2004 (POL); Label: Metal Mind Productions; Formats: DVD	Re-released as CD on 8 June 2009

=== Demos ===
Title	EP details
Abhorrence	Released: 1992 (POL); Label: Hate Production; Formats: CS
Evil Art	Released: 1994 (POL); Label: Loud Out Records; Formats: CS
The Unwritten Law	Released: 1995 (POL); Label: Novum Vox Mortiis; Formats: CS

=== Music videos ===
Year	Title	Directed	Album
2008	"Threnody"	Maciej "Dombro" Dąbrowski	Morphosis
2011	"Erebos"	Sławomir Makowski, Moderna Studio	Erebos
2013	"Alchemy of Blood"	Marcin Halerz, Red Pig Productions	Solarflesh - A Gospel of Radiant Divinity
2015	"Valley Of Darkness"	Red Pig Productions	Crusade:Zero
2017	"Numinosm	Błażej Jankowiak	Tremendum
2019	"Sovereign Sanctity	Błażej Jankowiak	The Auric Gates of Veles
2021	"Resurgence"	Błażej Jankowiak	Rugia
2021	"Exiles of Pantheon"	Błażej Jankowiak	Rugia
2025	"Iphigenia"	Błażej Jankowiak	Bellum Regiis
2025	"Bellum Regiis"	Błażej Jankowiak	Bellum Regiis
2025	"The Vanguard"	Błażej Jankowiak	Bellum Regiis

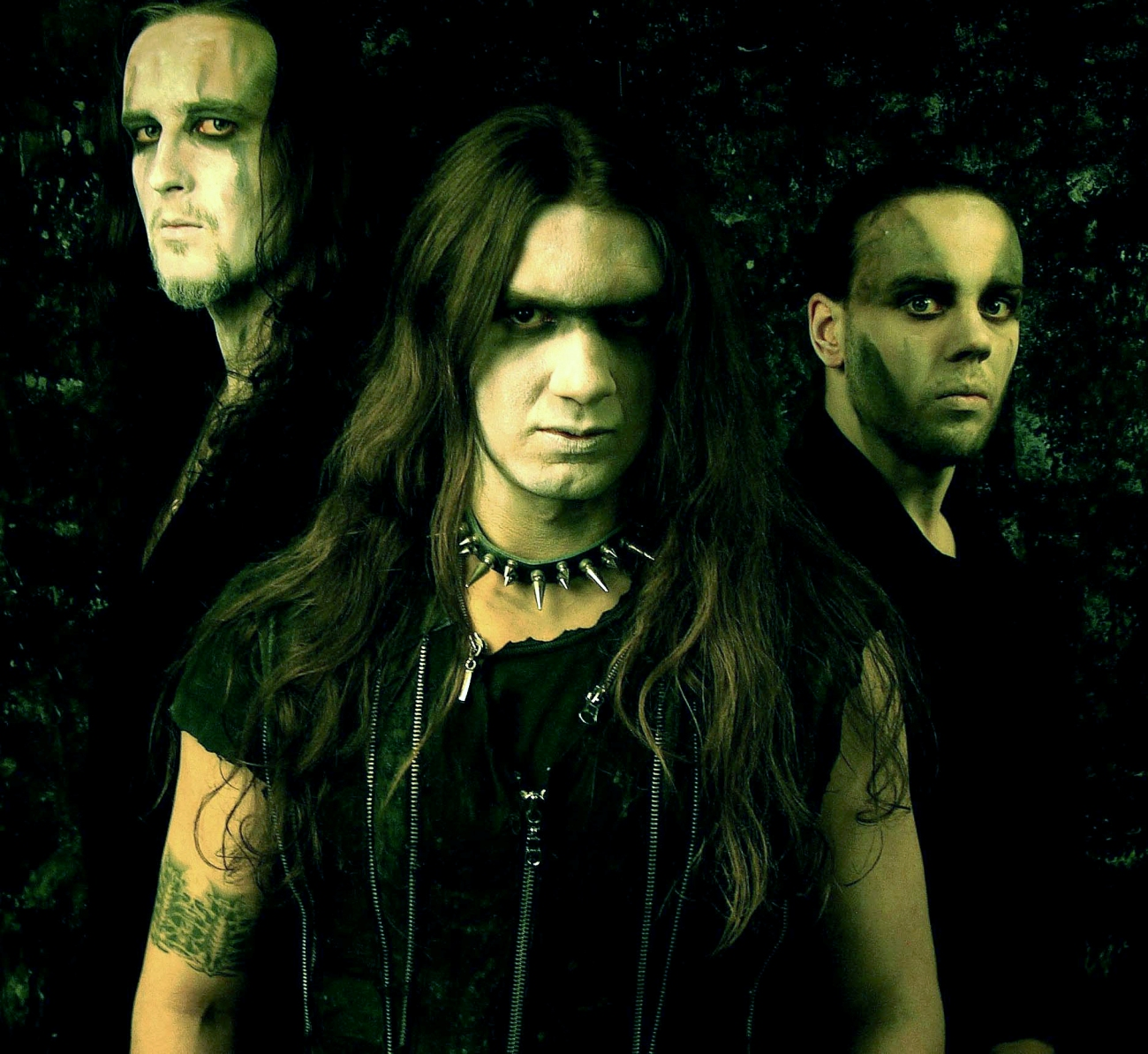
Hate in 2008

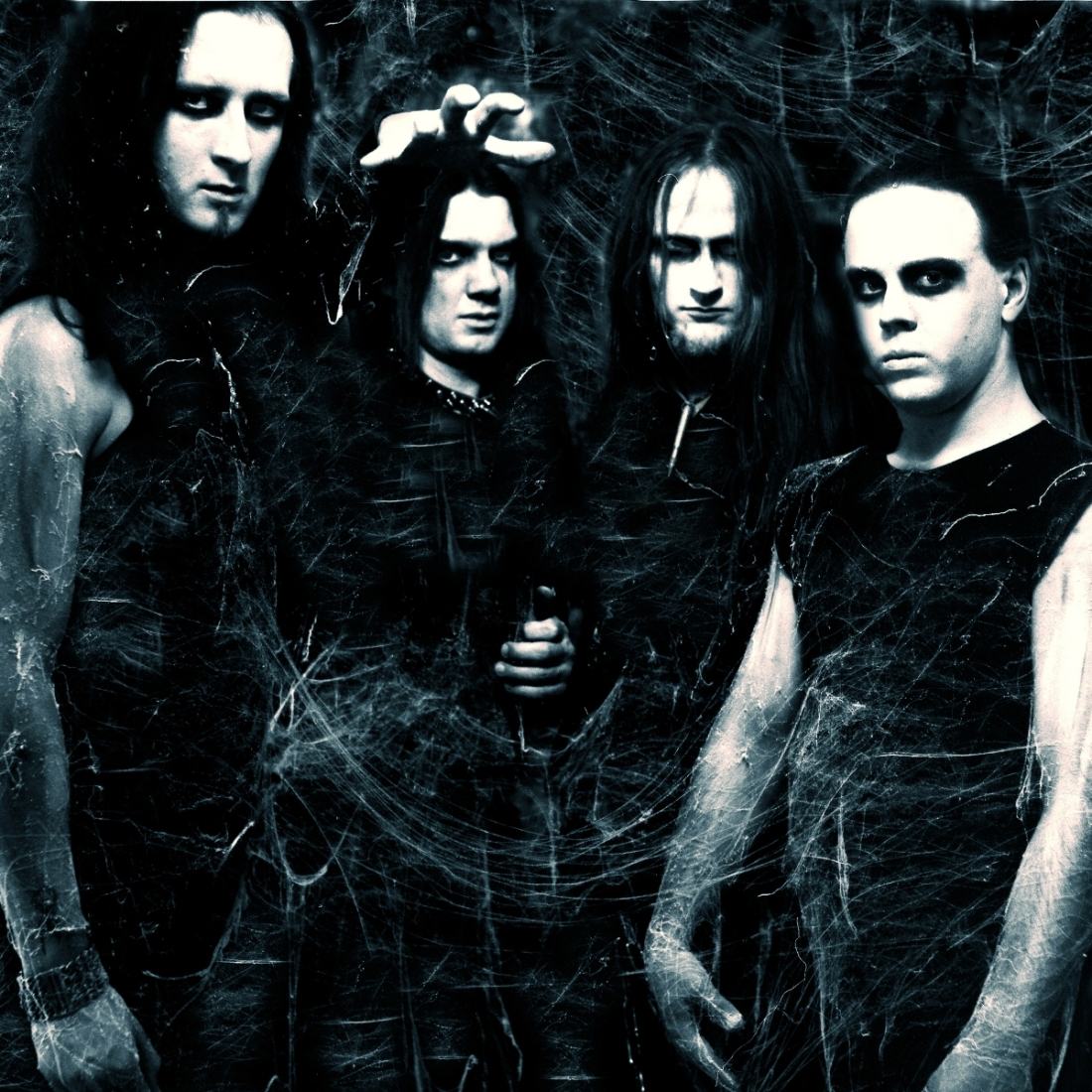
Hate in 2008

Hate in 2017

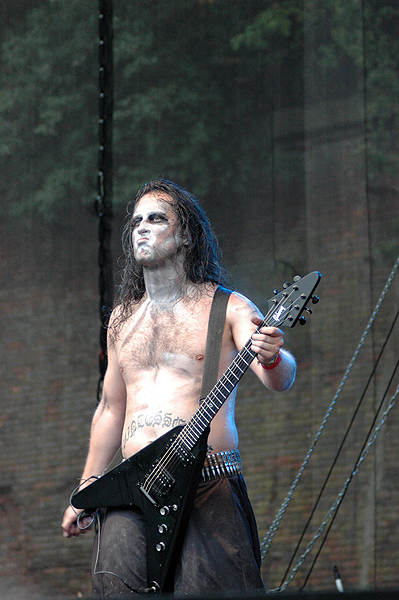
Former Guitarist Konrad "Destroyer" Ramotowski

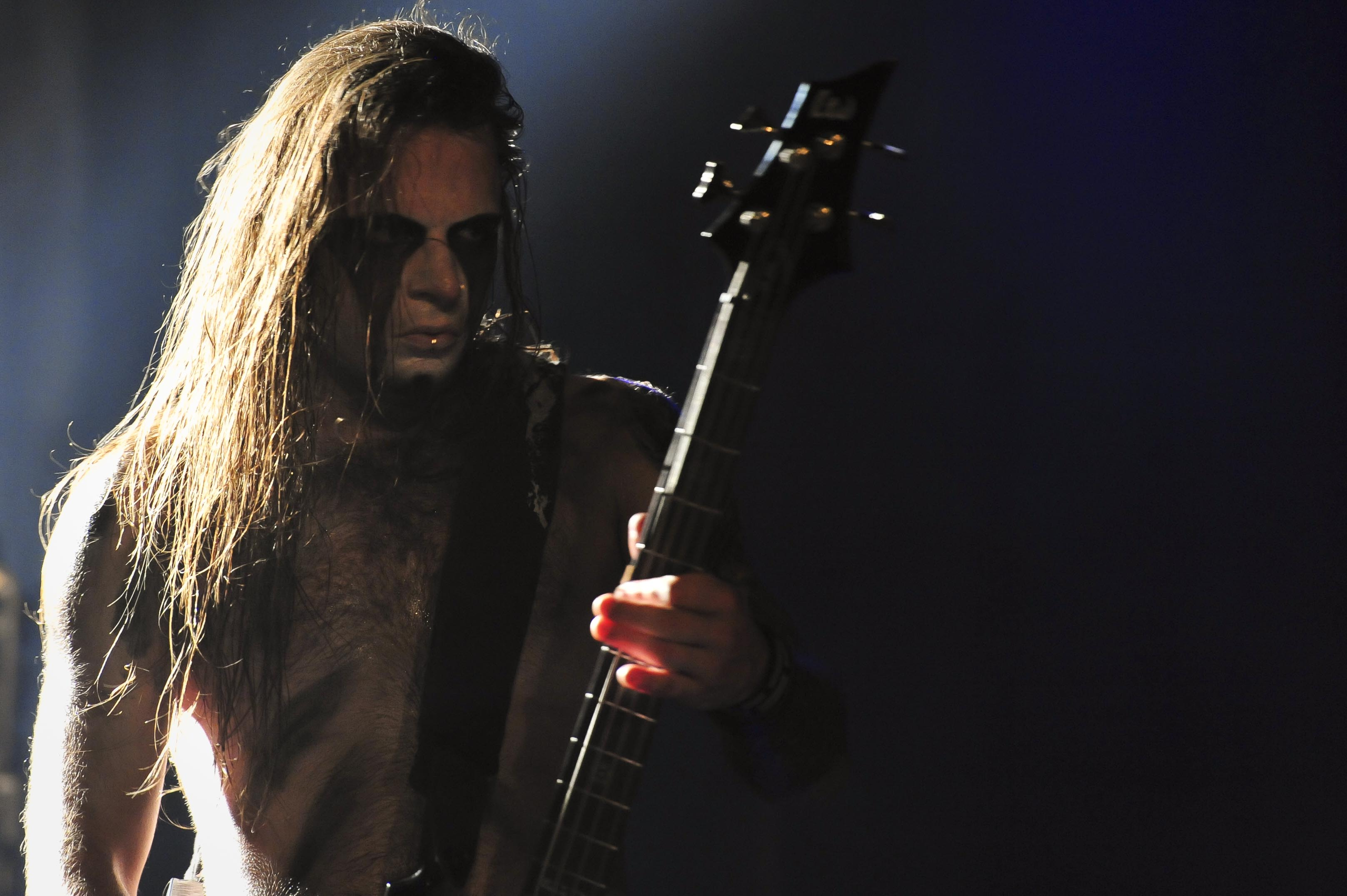
Former bassist Sławomir "Mortifer" Kusterka in 2011

Current lead guitarist Dominik "Domin" Prykiel in 2017

Former bassist Paweł "Apeiron" Michałowski in 2017

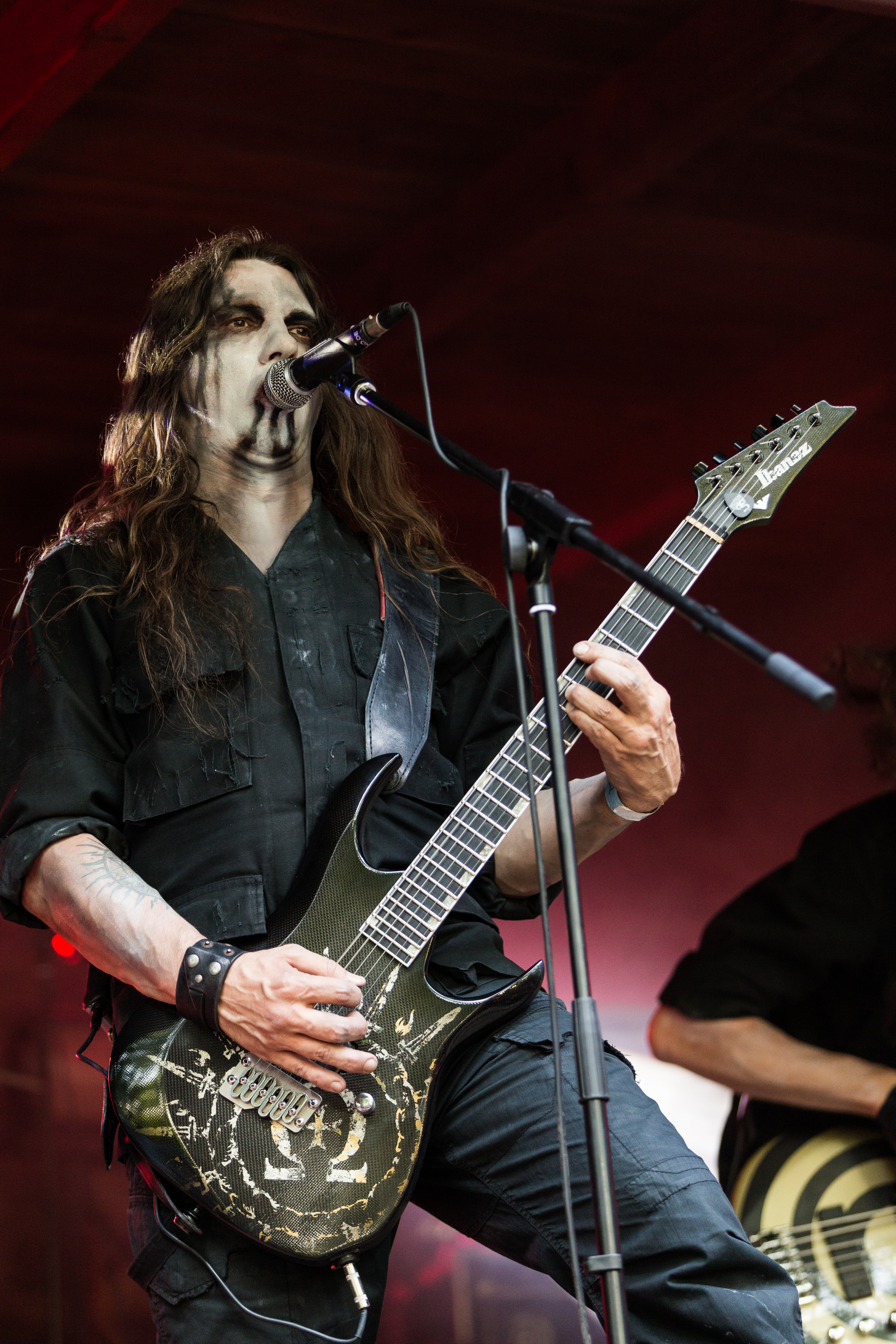
Adam "ATF Sinner' Buszko in 2017
