= Filip Hałucha =

Polish bassist (born 1980)

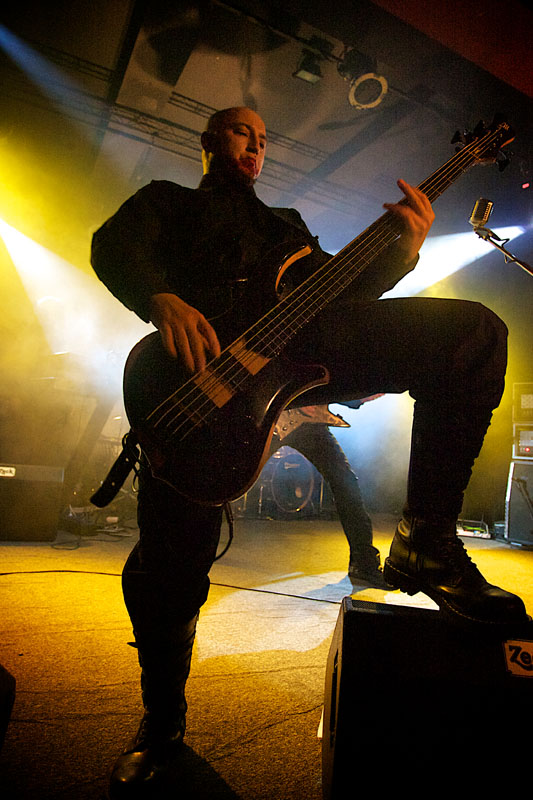
- Heinrich in 2011

Background information
- Also known as: Heinrich
- Born: 14 October 1980 (age 44)
- Origin: Warsaw, Poland
- Genres: Death metal, black metal
- Instrument: Bass guitar
- Years active: 1997–present

Filip "Heinrich" Hałucha (born 14 October 1980) is a Polish metal musician. He is the current bassist for Vesania and Masachist, and is a former bassist for Decapitated, Rootwater and UnSun.

== Gear ==
- Mayones Slogan 5
- Ampeg B4R amp
- Sansamp Bass Driver
- EBS Multidrive
- B.C. Rich Bernardo 5
- Ampeg SVT6Pro
- Ampeg SVT810E classic
- Sansamp RBI, MXR M80
- BBE sonic maximizer 362

== Discography ==
As band member

- Vesania - Firefrost Arcanum (2003, Empire Records)
- Vesania - God the Lux (2005, Napalm Records, Empire Records)
- Rootwater - Limbic System (2007, Mystic Production)
- Vesania - Distractive Killusions (2008, Napalm Records, Mystic Production)
- Rootwater - Visionism (2009, Mystic Production)
- UnSun - The End of Life (2008, Century Media)
- Masachist - Death March Fury (2009, Witching Hour Productions)
- UnSun - Clinic for Dolls (2010, Mystic Production)
- Decapitated - Carnival Is Forever (2011, Nuclear Blast)
- Masachist - Scorned (2012, Selfmadegod Records)

As session musician

- So I Scream - 6Shooter EP (2009, So I Scream)
- Gortal - Blastphemous Sindecade (2008, Pagan Records)
- Hate - Crusade:Zero (2015, Napalm Records)

Other

- Obscure Sphinx - Anaesthetic Inhalation Ritual (2011, Fuck the Tag, production)
- Dragon's Eye - The New Age (2011, Dragon's Eye, sound engineering, mix, mastering)
- Leash Eye - V.I.D.I. (2011, Metal Mind Productions, sound engineering)
- Lostbone - Ominous (2012, Metal Mundus Records, sound engineering, mix, mastering)
- Hate - Solarflesh – A Gospel of Radiant Divinity (2013, Napalm Records, sound engineering)
- Leash Eye - Hard Truckin' Rock (2013, Metal Mind Productions, sound engineering, mix, mastering)
- Corruption - Devil's Share (2014, Metal Mind Productions, sound engineering, mix, mastering)
