= Vesania =

Polish metal band

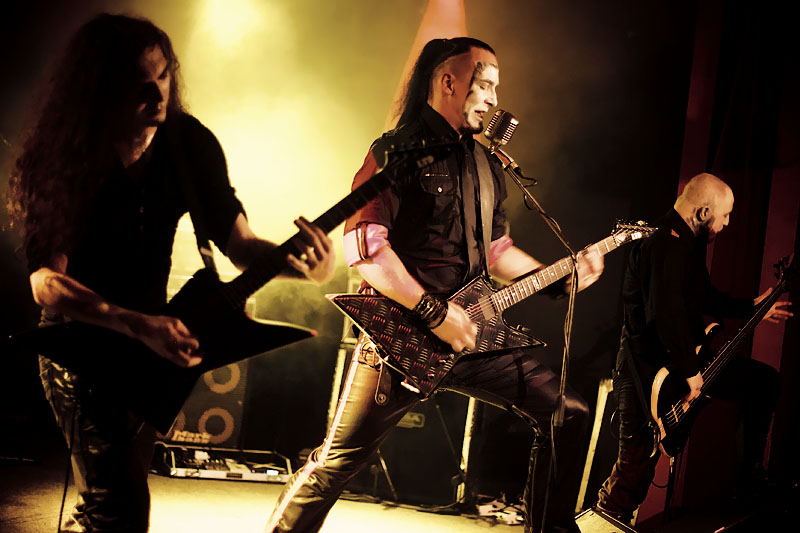
- Vesania performing in 2011

Background information
- Origin: Legionowo, Poland
- Genres: Symphonic black metal, blackened death metal
- Years active: 1997–2018
- Labels: Napalm, Empire, Mystic, Fonografika, Metal Blade

Vesania (Latin for "insanity") was a Polish extreme metal band formed in 1997 by Orion, Daray and Heinrich. Later members were Annahvahr and Hatrah, who left the band in 1999 and was replaced by Siegmar.

Their first release, Moonastray, was a split with Black Altar, released in 2002 by Odium Records exclusively in Poland. The release was limited to 666 copies and each CD was signed with blood. 2003 saw the release across Europe of their first full-length album, Firefrost Arcanum, by Empire Records. This was followed by the departure of band member Annahvahr. Their second album, God the Lux, was released in April 2005, and shortly thereafter Valeo (Sammath Naur, Mortis Dei) joined the band as lead guitarist. Their third album, Distractive Killusions, was released in 2007 on Napalm Records, from which came their first single "Rage of Reason".

The vocals include screaming and low growling.

== Members ==
- Tomasz "Orion" Wróblewski – guitar, vocals (1997–2018)
- Dariusz "Daray" Brzozowski – drums, percussion (1997–2018)
- Filip "Heinrich" Hałucha – bass (1997–2018)
- Krzysztof "Siegmar" Oloś – keyboards (2000–2018)
- Marcin "Valeo" Walenczykowski – guitar (2005–2018; died 2018)
- Hatrah – keyboards (1998–1999)
- Filip "Annahvahr" Żołyński – guitar, vocals (1998–2003)

=== Live ===
- Sławomir "Mortifer" Arkhangelsky (family name Kusterka) – guitar (2003; died 2013)
- Kerim "Krimh" Lechner – drums (2014)

== Discography ==
Studio albums

Title	Album details
Firefrost Arcanum	Released: 23 March 2003; Label: Empire Records, Crash Music; Formats: CD, digital download
God the Lux	Released: 25 April 2005; Label: Mystic Production, Napalm Records; Formats: CD, digital download
Distractive Killusions	Released: 20 November 2007; Label: Mystic Production, Napalm Records; Formats: CD, digital download
Deus ex Machina	Released: 25 October 2014; Label: Fonografika, Metal Blade Records; Formats: CD, digital download

Demos

Title	Demo details
Reh (tape)	Released: 1997; Label: Self-released; Formats: CD
CD Promo 1999	Released: 1999; Label: Self-released; Formats: CD

Other releases

Title	Details	Notes
Moonastray	Released: 2002; Label: Odium Records; Formats: CD	Split with Black Altar
"Rage of Reason"	Released: 15 January 2008; Label: Empire Records; Formats: CD	Single
