= Sean Deason =

American techno producer from Detroit

Sean Deason is an American techno producer from Detroit. His aliases include Project X, Sounds Intangible Nature, Freq, and X-313.

Deason got his start doing graphic design for Detroit techno artists while studying at the Center for Creative Studies; among those whose sleeves he designed were Juan Atkins, Derrick May, Kenny Larkin, and A Guy Called Gerald. He first produced for Acacia Records, owned by K Hand, and did work at Richie Hawtin's studio before founding his own label, Matrix Records. His first full-length, Razorback, was issued on Studio !K7 in 1996.

== Discography ==
As Sean Deason

- Pump (Matrix Records Detroit, 1994) single
- Within (Matrix Records Detroit, 1996) single
- Visionary EP (Matrix Records Detroit, 1996) single
- Razorback (Studio !K7), 1996) album
- Jupiter Sunrise (Studio !K7, 1997) single
- Zig (Intuit-Solar, 2000) single
- Allegory and Metaphor (Intuit-Solar, 2000) album
- Love Alarm (Matrix Records, 2002) single
- Elements Vol. 1 (Matrix Records Detroit, 2009) single
- Elements Vol. 2 (Matrix Records Detroit, 2009) single
- Dot & Etta's Shrimp Hut (Matrix Records, 2009) album
- Rebound EP (with Rob Belleville) (aDepth audio, 2012) single
- Detroit City EP (Modelhart, 2013) single

As Freq

- Plastique (Generator Records, 1994) single
- Green EP (Matrix Records Detroit, 1994) single
- Red EP (Matrix Records Detroit, 1994) single
- Innerspace (Matrix Records Detroit, 1994) single
- With A Vengeance (Matrix Records Detroit, 1997) single
- Heaven (Distance Records, 1997) single
