= Adam Buszko =

Polish musician (born 1975)

- Buszko in 2008
- Born: 19 April 1975 (age 51); Warsaw, Poland
- Education: University of Warsaw
- Occupations: Musician; songwriter
- Musical career
- Also known as: Deimos, Adam the First Sinner, ATF Sinner
- Genres: Death metal; black metal; industrial rock
- Instruments: Guitar; vocals; bass; drums; keyboards
- Labels: Listenable; Napalm; Metal Blade
- Member of: Hate; Mothernight

ATF Sinner (born Adam Buszko 19 April 1975, in Warsaw), also known as Adam The First Sinner, is a Polish musician, vocalist, composer and multi-instrumentalist. He graduated in psychology at the University of Warsaw.

Buszko is a guitarist, singer and songwriter of the death metal band Hate, which he formed in 1990 with the drummer Piotr Kozieradzki (Riverside) and guitarist Andrzej Kułakowski.

He also formed the industrial rock band Mothernight in which he performs under the stage name Deimos. In 2007 has recorded the Mothernight album with the band – released by Locomotive Records same year.

== Gear ==
- Ran Invader Custom 6 String
- Ran Thor Custom 6 String
- Ibanez ARZ 700 6 String
- Ibanez Prestige RG 7 String
- Bc rich mockingbird

== Discography ==
- Mothernight – Mothernight (LP, 2007, Locomotive Records)
