= Music of Poland =

The music of Poland covers diverse aspects of music and musical traditions which have originated, and are practiced in Poland. Artists from Poland include world-famous classical composers like Frédéric Chopin, Karol Szymanowski, Witold Lutosławski, Henryk Górecki and Krzysztof Penderecki; renowned pianists like Karl Tausig, Ignacy Jan Paderewski, Arthur Rubinstein and Krystian Zimerman; as well as popular music artists, and traditional, regionalised folk music ensembles that create a rich and lively music scene at the grassroots level. The musicians of Poland, over the course of history, have developed and popularized a variety of music genres and folk dances such as mazurka, polonaise, krakowiak, kujawiak, polska partner dance, oberek; as well as the sung poetry genre (poezja śpiewana) and others. Mazurek (Mazur), Krakowiak, Kujawiak, Oberek and Polonaise (Polonez) are registered as Polish National Dances, originating in early Middle Ages. The oldest of them is Polonaise that comes from the Medieval pageant dances and it was originally called "chodzony", a "walking dance".

Polish music exhibits influences from a broad variety of styles which are represented by critically acclaimed bands, such as Perfect (Zbigniew Hołdys), Status Qwo, Maanam (Kora), T.Love, Golec uOrkiestra, Budka Suflera, Czerwone Gitary, Dżem, Big Cyc, as well as many other renowned artists, e.g. Czesław Niemen, Magdalena Ostrowska, Jacek Kaczmarski, Wojciech Młynarski, Czesław Mozil, Jakob Węgiel, Marek Grechuta, and contemporary singer-songwriters and pop icons including Margaret, Maria Peszek, Myslovitz, Edyta Bartosiewicz, and Doda; jazz musicians Tomasz Stańko, Krzysztof Komeda, Włodek Pawlik, Adam Makowicz, Leszek Możdżer, and Michał Urbaniak; death and black metal music bands Behemoth, Vader, and Decapitated; and film and contemporary classical music composers Wojciech Kilar, Jan A.P. Kaczmarek, Zbigniew Preisner, Abel Korzeniowski, Krzesimir Dębski, and Krzysztof Meyer, among many others.

== Classical music ==
=== Medieval and Renaissance ===
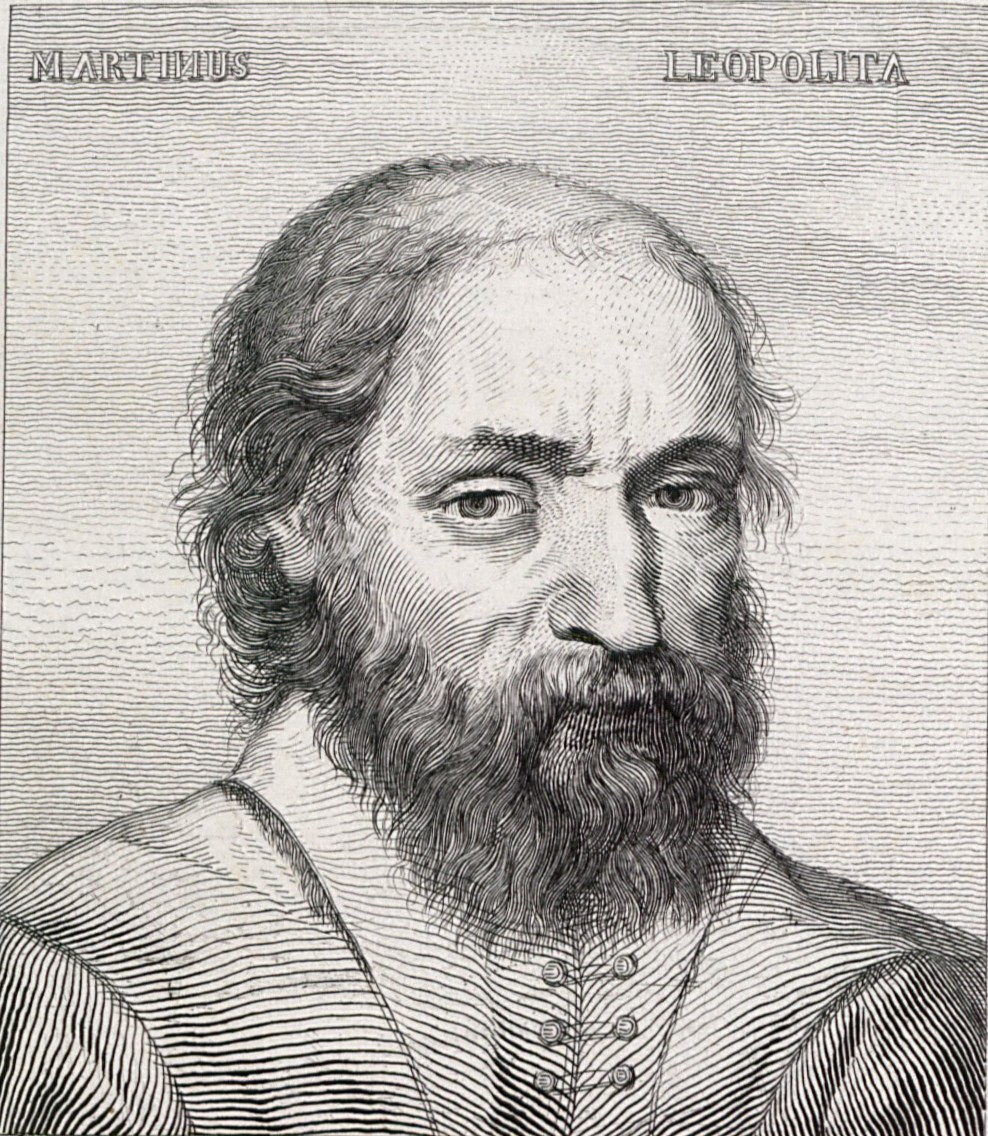
Portrait of Marcin Leopolita, c. 1570

The origin of Polish music can be traced as far back as the 13th century, from which manuscripts have been found in Stary Sącz, containing polyphonic compositions related to the Parisian Notre Dame School. Other early compositions, such as the melody of Bogurodzica, may also date back to this period. The first known notable composer, Mikołaj z Radomia (Nicholas of Radom), lived in the 15th century.

During the 16th century, mostly two musical ensembles – both based in Kraków and belonging to the King and the Archbishop of Wawel – led the rapid innovation of Polish music. Composers writing during this period include Wacław z Szamotuł, Mikołaj Zieleński, Nicolaus Cracoviensis, Marcin Leopolita and Mikołaj Gomółka, who composed "Melodies to Polish Psalter". Diomedes Cato, a native-born Italian who lived in Kraków from about the age of five, became one of the most famous lutenists at the court of Sigismund III, and not only imported some of the musical styles from southern Europe, but blended them with native folk music.

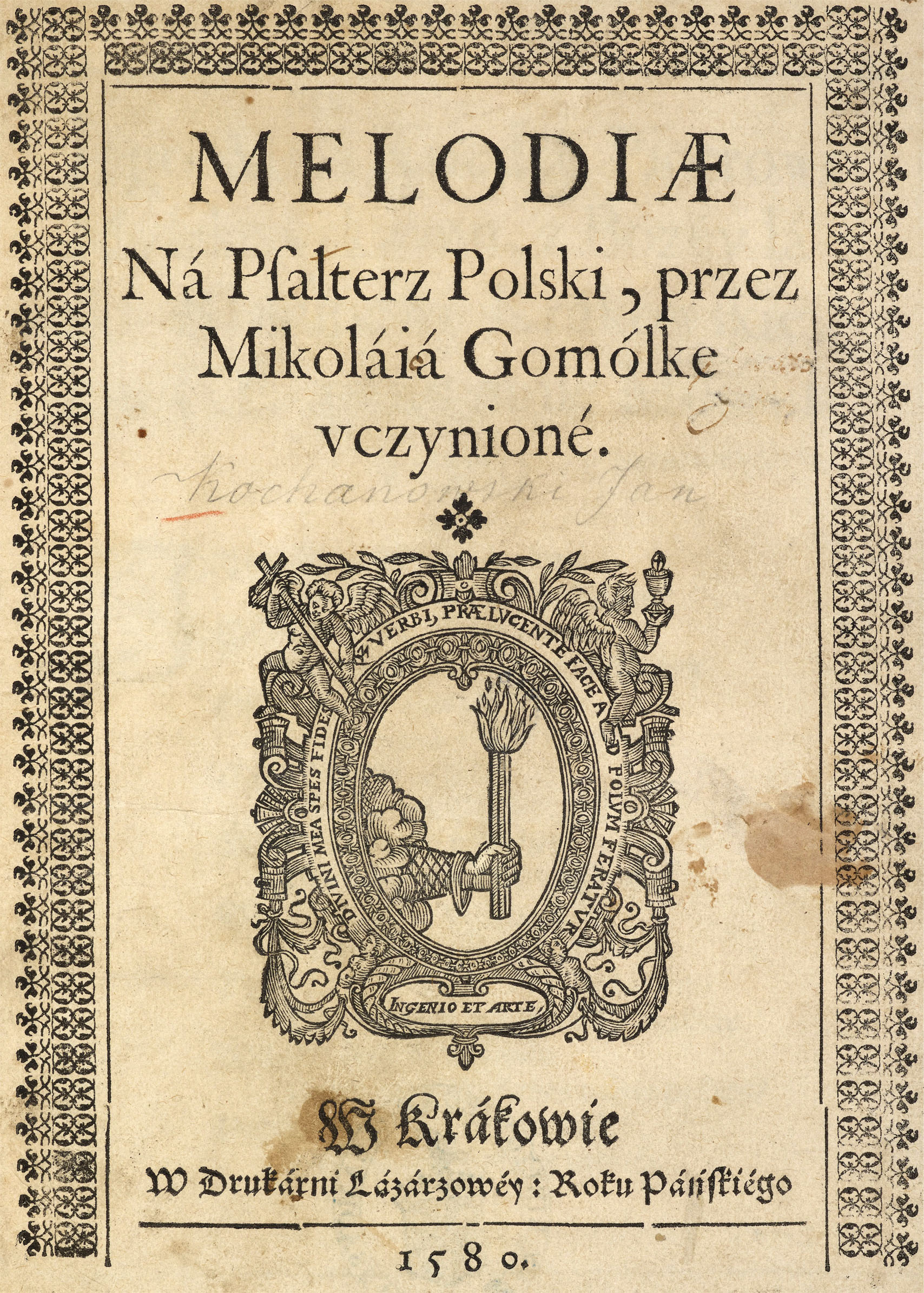
Cover page of the "Melodies for the Polish Psalter" composed by Mikołaj Gomółka, 1580

=== Baroque ===
During the 17th century, Polish composers from this period focused on baroque religious music, concertos for voices, instruments, and basso continuo, a tradition that continued into the 18th century. The most renowned composer of this period is Adam Jarzębski, known for his instrumental works such as Chromatica, Tamburetta, Sentinella, Bentrovata, and Nova Casa. Other composers include Grzegorz Gerwazy Gorczycki, Franciszek Lilius, Bartłomiej Pękiel, Stanisław Sylwester Szarzyński and Marcin Mielczewski. Also, in the last years of the 16th century and the first part of the 17th century, a number of Italian musicians were guests at the royal courts of Sigismund III and Władysław IV. These included Luca Marenzio, Giovanni Francesco Anerio, and Marco Scacchi.

In addition, a tradition of operatic production began in Warsaw in 1628, with a performance of Galatea (composer uncertain), the first Italian opera produced outside Italy. Shortly after this performance, the court produced Francesca Caccini's opera La liberazione di Ruggiero dall'isola d'Alcina, which she had written for Prince Władysław three years earlier when he was in Italy. Another first, this is the earliest surviving opera written by a woman. When Władysław was king (as Władysław IV) he oversaw the production of at least ten operas during the late 1630s and 1640s, making Warsaw a center of the art. The composers of these operas are not known: they may have been Poles working under Marco Scacchi in the royal chapel, or they may have been among the Italians imported by Władysław.

Composers of the latter part of the 18th century included Maciej Radziwill, whose style has been characterized as being in the galant style.

=== Classical ===
Feliks Janiewicz, Karol Kurpiński, Jan Stefani, Wojciech Żywny and Franciszek Ścigalski were Polish composers writing in the classical period style characteristic in the 18th and early 19th centuries. The first national opera, Krakowiacy i Górale written by Wojciech Bogusławski and Jan Stefani premiered on 1 March 1794.

=== Romantic ===
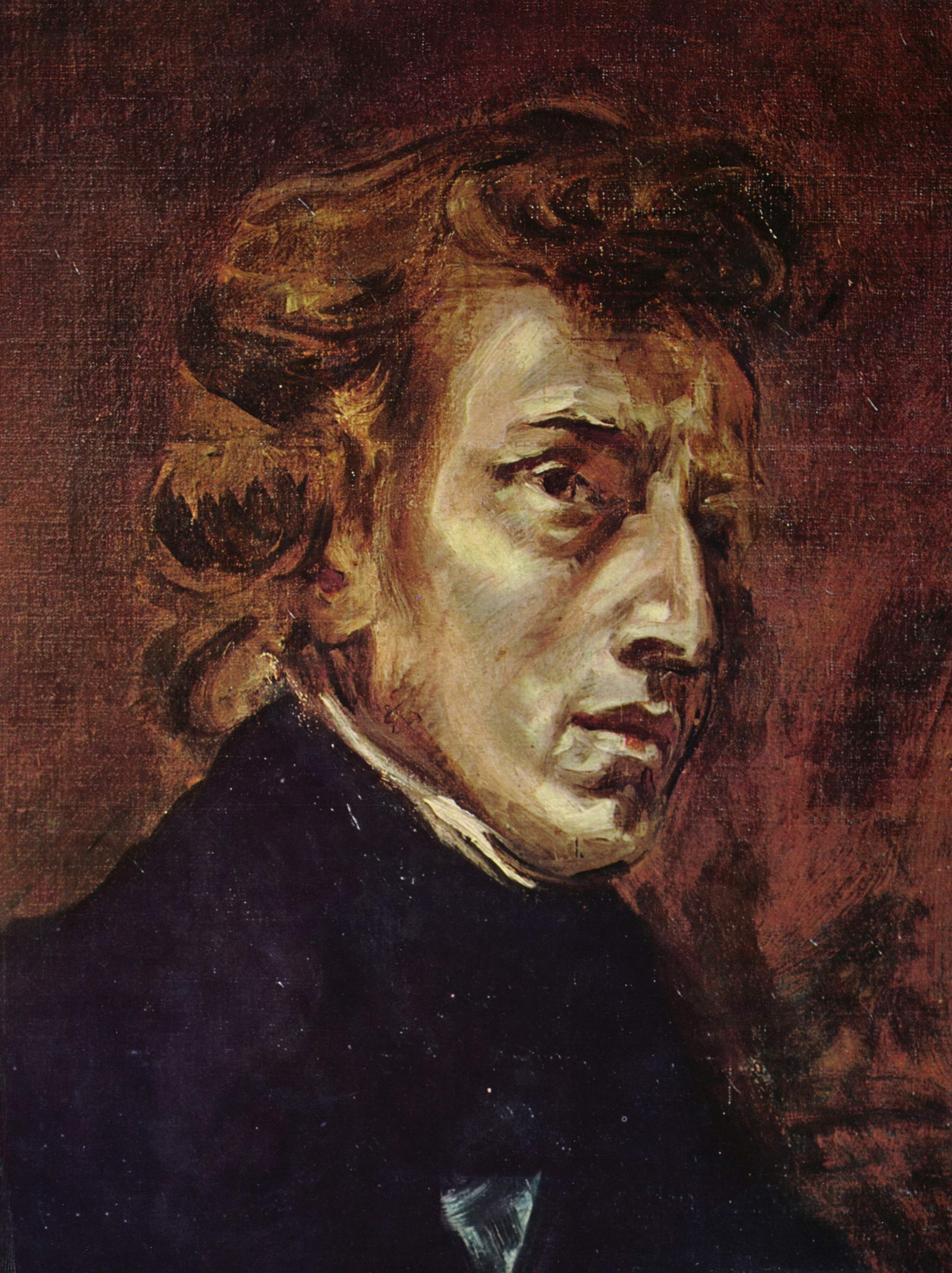
Frédéric Chopin by Delacroix, 1838

At the end of the 18th century, Polish classical music evolved into national forms like the Polonaise and Mazurka — perhaps the first distinctively Polish art music. Polonaises for piano were and remain popular, such as those by Jacek Szczurowski, Michał Kleofas Ogiński, Juliusz Zarębski, Henryk Wieniawski, Józef Elsner, and, most famously, Frédéric Chopin. Chopin remains very well known, and is regarded for composing a wide variety of works, including mazurkas, nocturnes, waltzes and concertos, and using traditional Polish elements in his pieces. The same period saw Stanisław Moniuszko, the leading individual in the successful development of Polish opera, still renowned for operas like Halka and The Haunted Manor.

In the 19th century the most popular composers were Maria Agata Szymanowska, Franciszek Lessel, and Ignacy Feliks Dobrzyński. Important opera composers were Karol Kurpiński and Stanisław Moniuszko. At the turn of the 19th and 20th centuries the most prominent composers were Władysław Żeleński and Mieczysław Karłowicz. Karol Szymanowski gained prominence prior to World War II. Józef Koffler was the first Polish twelve-tone composer (dodecaphonist).

=== Contemporary ===
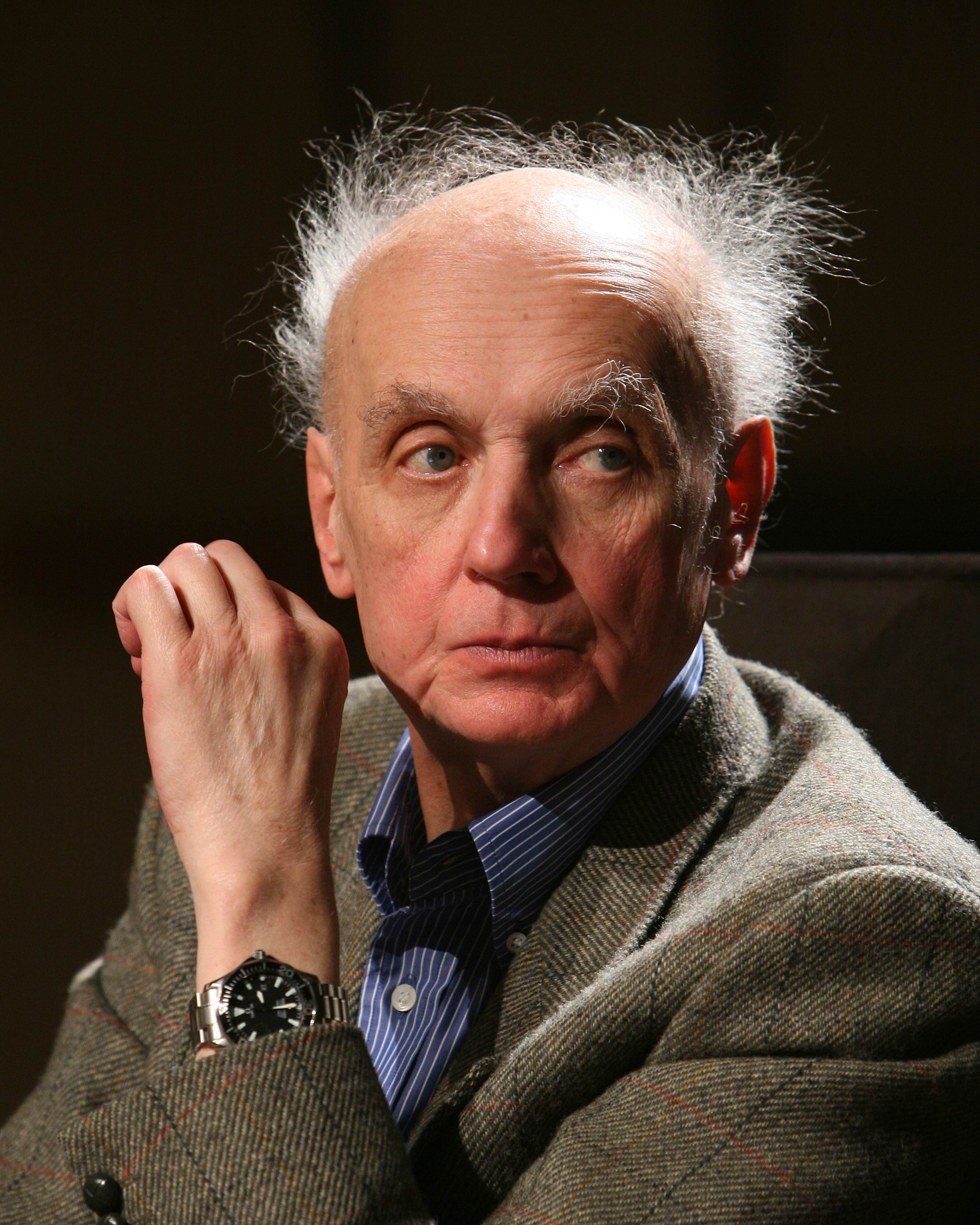
Wojciech Kilar, classical and film music composer, 2006

Between the wars, a group of new and emerging composers formed the Association of Young Polish Musicians; which included future luminaries Grażyna Bacewicz, Zygmunt Mycielski, Michał Spisak and Tadeusz Szeligowski.

Following World War II and the country becoming a communist system, some composers, such as Roman Palester and Andrzej Panufnik, fled the country and remained in exile. In the early 1960s, a number of Polish composers formed the Polish Composers' School, characterized by the use of sonorism and dodecaphonism. The style emerged from the political crisis in 1956, following Stalin's death. In the same year the Warsaw Autumn music festival was inaugurated, both closely connected. According to conductor Antoni Wit composers were given artistic freedom because the Polish regime wasn't as harsh as other Eastern European dictatorships and music wasn't considered ideologically relevant unlike literature, theater or cinema. Composers from the "Polish School" included Tadeusz Baird, Bogusław Schaeffer, Włodzimierz Kotoński, Witold Szalonek, Krzysztof Penderecki, Witold Lutosławski, Wojciech Kilar, Kazimierz Serocki, Tomasz Sikorski, Zygmunt Krauze and Henryk Mikołaj Górecki.

More modern classical and jazz composers include Krzysztof Meyer, Jan A.P. Kaczmarek, Paweł Szymański, Krzesimir Dębski, Hanna Kulenty, Eugeniusz Knapik, Paweł Łukaszewski, Paweł Mykietyn, Maciej Zieliński, Marcel Chyrzyński, Marta Ptaszynska and Agata Zubel.

=== Recordings ===
The Polskie Nagrania Muza was the state recording company, from 1956. Following the fall of communism it was bought by Warner Music Poland. It dealt with the wide range of music tastes, folk, popular, classical and children's music.

== Traditional folk music ==
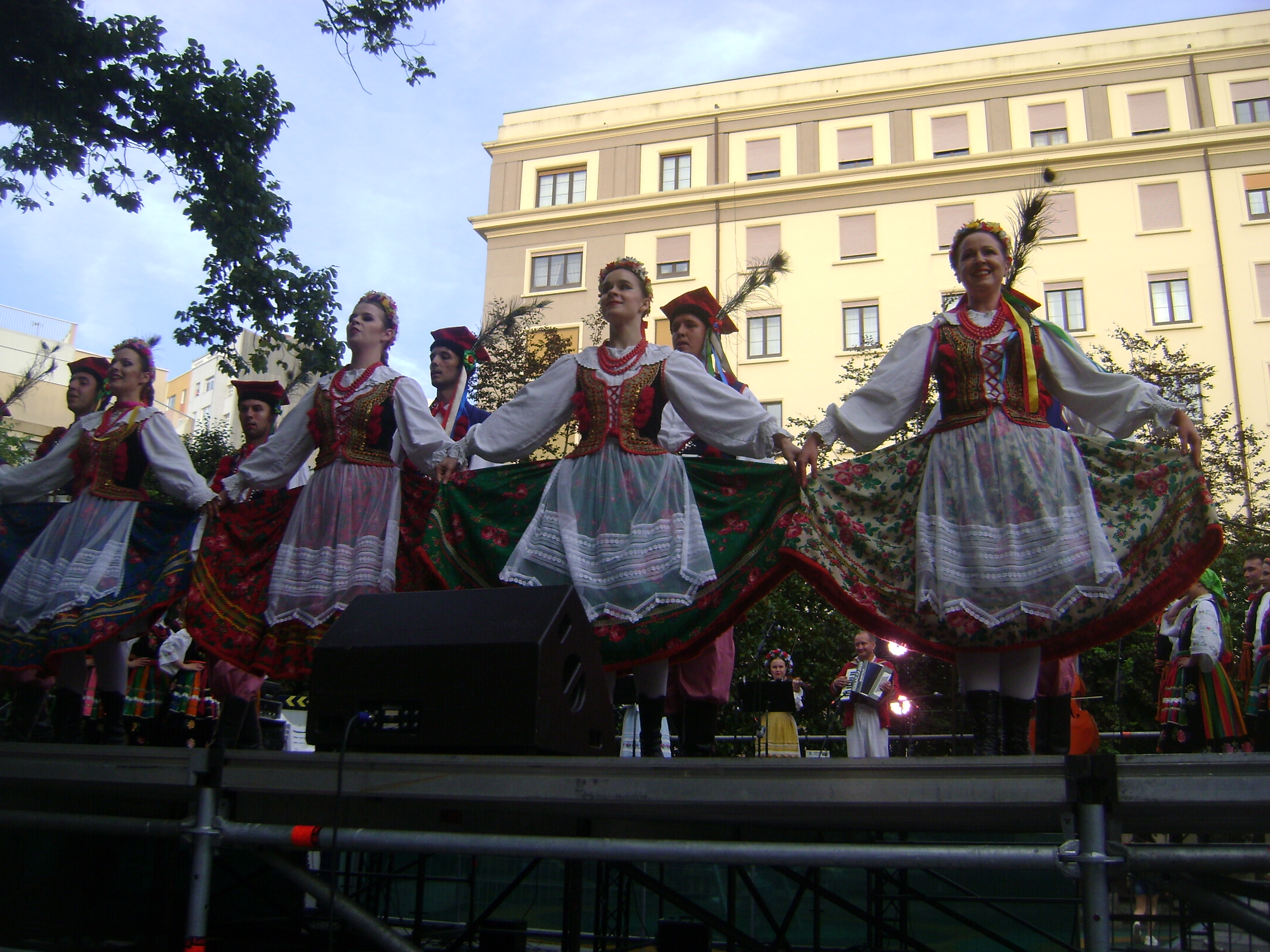
Polish folklore in La Coruña, Galicia, (Spain).

Polish folk music was collected in the 19th century by Oskar Kolberg, as part of a wave of Polish national revival. After World War II, in the Polish People's Republic, folk traditions were commonly cultivated, but public performances and broadcasts had also highly organized and officially promoted forms. State-supported, large-scale folk ensembles became prominent. The most famous of these were Mazowsze and Śląsk, both of which still perform. Though such bands presented interpretations of regional folk repertoire, the overall sound was a homogenized mixture of Polish styles. There were more authentic groups, such as Słowianki, but the sanitized image of folk music made the whole field unattractive to some audiences, and many traditions dwindled rapidly.

National Dance of Poland, recorded around 1900

Polish dance music, especially the mazurka and polonaise, were popularized by Frédéric Chopin, and they soon spread across Europe and elsewhere. These are triple time dances, while five-beat forms are more common in the northeast and duple-time dances like the krakowiak come from the south. The 'polonaise' comes from the French word for 'Polish' used to identify its origin among the Polish aristocracy who had adapted the dance from a slower walking dance called chodzony. The polonaise then re-entered the lower-class musical life, and became an integral part of the Polish music.

=== Podhale ===
While folk music lost popularity in Poland, especially in urban areas, the tourist destination of Podhale has retained its lively traditions. The regional capital, Zakopane, has been a center for art since the late 19th century, when people like composer Karol Szymanowski, who discovered Goral folk music there, made the area chic among Europe's intellectuals. Though a part of Poland, Podhale's musical life is more closely related to that found in the Carpathian mountains of Ukraine, Slovakia, Moravia in Czech Republic and Romania.

Local ensembles use string instruments like violins and a cello to play distinctive scales with augumented fourth, mainly the lydian mode and acoustic scale, in Poland called skala podhalańska. The distinctive singing style used in this scale is called lidyzowanie. The lead violin (prym) are accompanied by several second violins (sekund) and a three-stringed cello (basy). Duple-time dances like the krzesany, zbójnicki (the Brigand's Dance) and ozwodna are popular. The ozwodna has a five-bar melodic structure which is quite unusual. The krzesany is an extremely swift dance, while the zbójnicki is well-known and is perceived as being most "typical" of Podhale and Northern Slovakia. Folk songs typically focus on heroes like Juraj Jánošík.

=== Other regions ===
Outside of Podhale, other regions have folk scenes, in Kraków, for example, through the Dom Tanca movement, though they are lesser known. There are also music festivals, such as the Kazimierz Festival, which are well-known and popular. Regional folk bands include Gienek Wilczek Band (Bukowina), Tadeusz Jedynak Band (Przystalowice Male), Stachy Band (Hazców nad Wislokiem), Franciszek Gola Band (Kadzidło), Edward Markocki Band (Zmyslówka-Podlesie), Kazimierz Kantor Band (Głowaczowa), Swarni Band (Nowy Targ), Kazimierz Meto Band (Glina), Ludwik Młynarczyk Band (Lipnica), Kujawska Atlantyda (Kujawy) and Trebunie-Tutki.

== Contemporary popular music ==
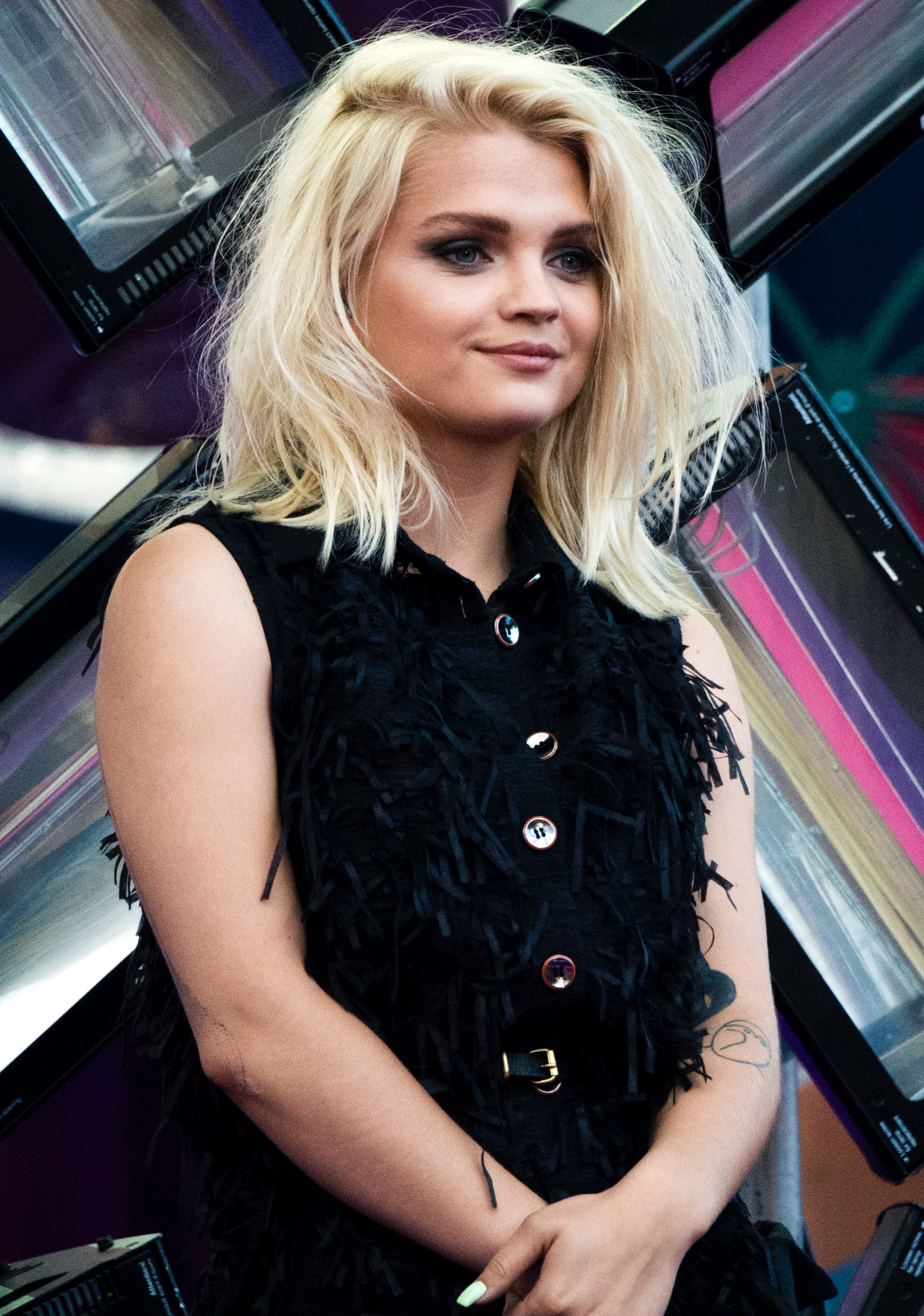
Margaret, one of the most recognized Polish singers

Poland has always been a very open country to new music genres and even before the fall of the communism, music styles like rock, metal, jazz, electronic, and new wave were well known. Since 1989, the Polish scene has exploded with new talents and a more diverse style.

Every year, a huge gathering of young Poles meet to honour the rock and alternative music in Jarocin, Żary, at Woodstock Festival Poland in Kostrzyn nad Odrą and at Open'er Festival and Off Festival. These events often attract more than 250,000 people and are comparable to the gatherings in Woodstock and Roskilde.

In jazz music, Polish musicians created a specific style, which was most famous in 1960s and 1970s. Some prominent Polish jazz artists are: Krzysztof Komeda, Zbigniew Namysłowski, Adam Makowicz, Tomasz Stańko, Włodek Pawlik, Michał Urbaniak, Leszek Możdżer. Some of the most popular and commercially successful Polish vocalists of 20th and 21st centuries are Czesław Niemen, Edyta Górniak, Myslovitz, Doda, Maryla Rodowicz, Kamil Bednarek, Ewa Farna, Agnieszka Chylińska, Sylwia Grzeszczak, Michał Szpak, Edyta Bartosiewicz, Anna Maria Jopek, Kasia Nosowska, Dawid Podsiadło, Sarsa, Monika Brodka and Margaret.

Two contemporary big Polish music festivals are Opole Festival and Sopot Festival. Among other important festivals there are: Jazz Jamboree, Rawa Blues Festival and Wratislavia Cantans.

== Heavy metal ==
=== Black metal ===
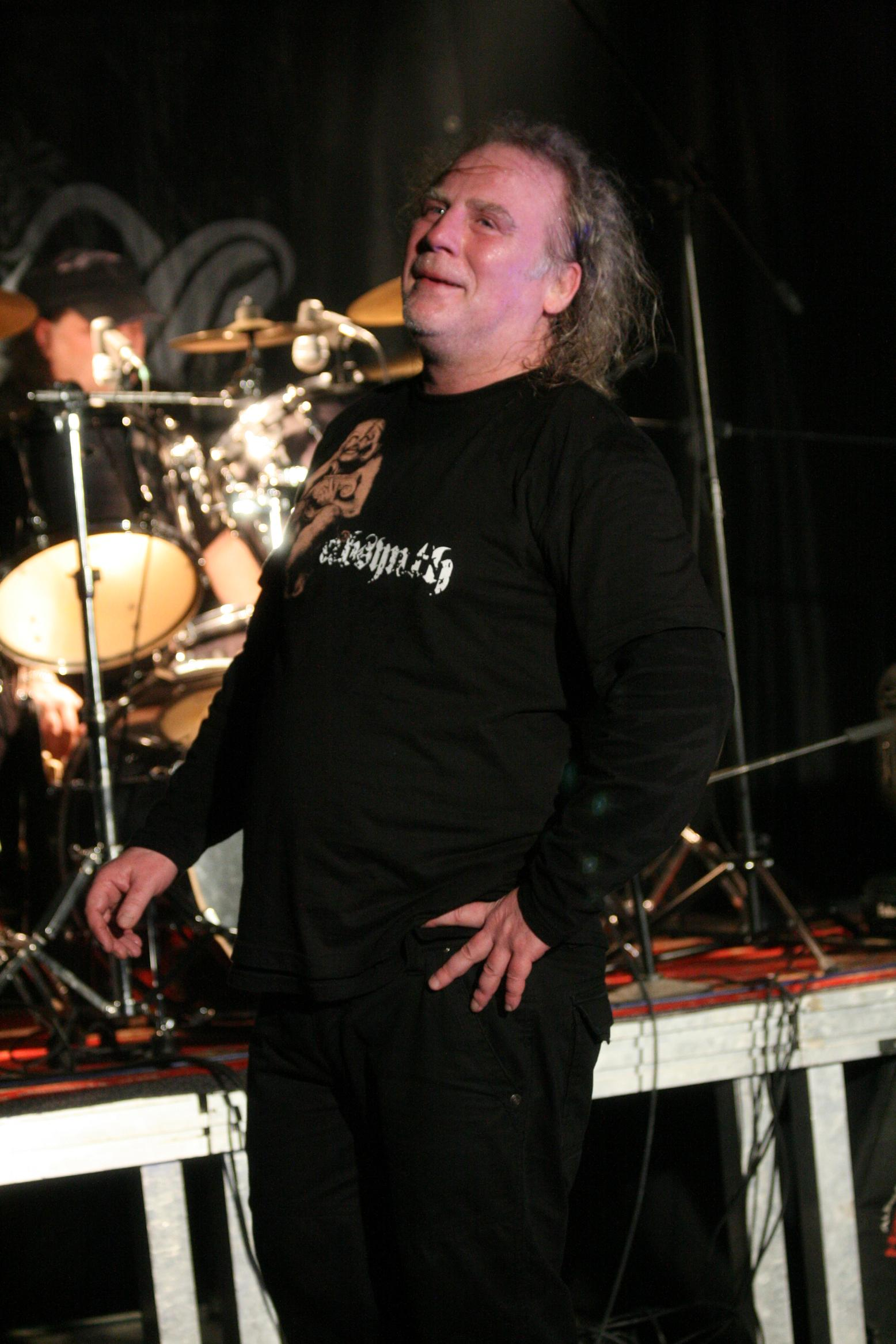
Roman Kostrzewski, former frontman of Kat, one of the most influentional Polish heavy metal bands performing in 2010

Black metal in Poland has evolved since the 1980s, although the first bands strictly in this genre appeared in the early 1990s, with the growth of the Norwegian black metal movement. One of the first Polish black metal bands, founded in late 1979, was Kat from Katowice, which was originally classified as thrash, and heavy metal. Kat was a major influence on Polish heavy metal music, developing their harsh sound with straightforward satanic lyrics, and later were heavily inspired by the poetry of Tadeusz Miciński. The group has reformed several times over the years, and remains active, with their guitarist co-founder on studio projects. After a naming dispute in the early 2000s Kat & Roman Kostrzewski continue with both their live, and studio legacy.

Other bands, classified as black metal in the 1980s, include Imperator (founded in 1984) with an antichristian approach in their music, and Vader (founded in 1983) with Satan themed lyrics, appearing on stage in leather and spikes. While still active, Vader later developed a death metal sound with occult themed lyrics, Imperator's style of music is disputed; reformed twice in the 1990s, the band eventually dissolved in 2000, with only one studio album released. Minor Polish black metal bands of the 1980s include Fantom (founded 1985), Scarecrow with an origin in speed metal (formed 1987), thrash metal influenced Bundeswehra (1988), Apocalyptic Slaughter (1988), Dethroner later renamed Enormity (1987). All were short lived local acts, who only released demo recordings.

In the 1990s a wide range of black metal bands developed, such as Christ Agony, Mussorgski (both founded in 1990), Behemoth, Besatt, Xantotol (all founded in 1991), Oppressor later renamed Baphomets Throne, Mastiphal, Graveland, North, Taranis, Infernum (all founded in 1992), Hermh, Arkona, Thunderbolt, Profanum (all founded in 1993), Lux Occulta (founded in 1994), Darzamat (founded in 1995), Witchmaster (founded in 1996), Crionics and Vesania (founded in 1997). After its first album, Christ Agony signed to the French Adipocere Records, then to Cacophonous Records, and then to Hammerheart Records. They received a brief period of recognition in the European underground, but later became a minor act. After their seventh album in 2009 Christ Agony eventually signed to Mystic Production and gained nostalgic recognition in Poland with support from European tours.

During early and mid-1990s, Behemoth, Graveland, Infernum, Profanum, Kataxu and other bands developed a distinguishable Polish black metal style, which featured a decent atmospheric keyboard usage and nature sound samples (e.g. wind, raven cries), while still preserving the raw production values. Behemoth quickly become popular in the underground with support from Graveland's mainman Rob Darken, and later with influentional label Avantgarde Music. Based in Gdańsk, the band eventually developed death metal influenced sound, and gained international recognition. Other bands of the 1990s such as Baphomets Throne, North, Mussorgski, Besatt, Infernum remained active, but were signed to underground labels and never received international acclaim. In later years only Darzamat, after several album releases, were signed to Massacre Records, but their short lived European recognition was broken by lineup changes. Vesania signed to Napalm Records, went on hiatus, but released three albums in the 2000s. Later, Poland developed bands such as MasseMord, Mgła (both founded in 2000), Furia (founded in 2003), Morowe (2006) and Blaze of Perdition (2007); though all of these are only known in the underground circuit.

Within black metal in Poland, several National Socialist Black Metal (NSBM) bands developed such as Veles (founded in 1992), Gontyna Kry (founded in 1993), Kataxu (1994), Ohtar (1996), and Sunwheel (1998), all of which attracted the interest of the Anti-Defamation League, and were considered to perform "music of hate". In the early 1990s NSBM was also investigated by the Polish Office for State Protection. Although Graveland were extremely popular among NSBM fans and generally seen as a National Socialist band, Rob Darken rejects this label, and told Decibel magazine: "I do not think Graveland is an NSBM band. Graveland is regarded as a NSBM band because of my political convictions, [which] most people would call extreme right-wing, National Socialist convictions."

=== Death metal ===
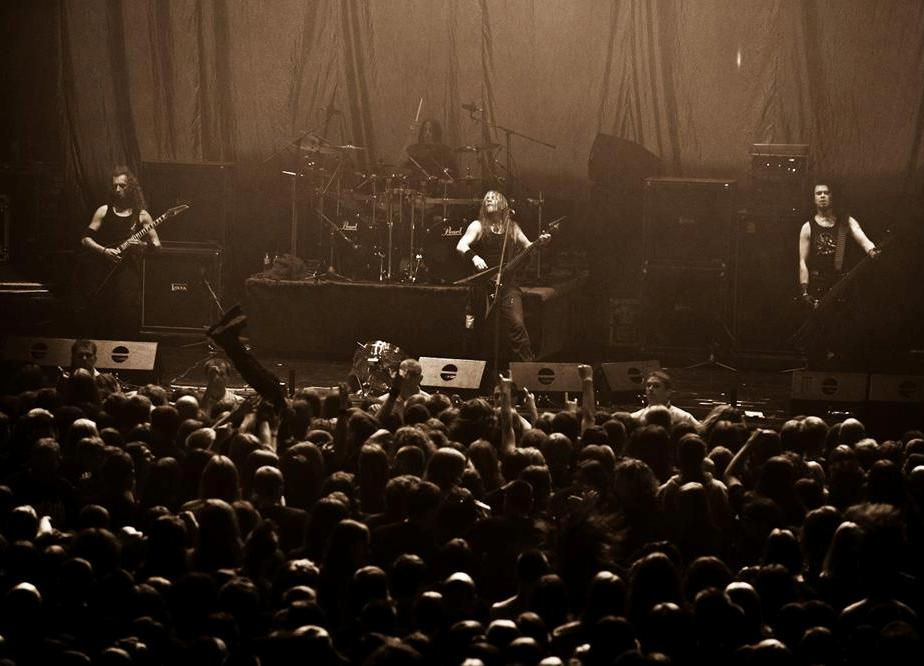
Vader is the longest running Polish death metal band; pictured performing at Metal Hammer Festival in Poland in 2011

In the 1980s Poland developed an early death metal movement, though at the time many of the bands were referred to as either black metal or thrash metal, many were later classified as death metal. Some of the bands of the period include Vader, which started as a classic heavy metal group (founded in 1983), and others with origin in thrash metal, like Imperator (founded in 1984), Armagedon (founded in 1986), Magnus (founded in 1987), Ghost and Thanatos later renamed Trauma (both founded in 1988), Bloodlust, and Betrayer (both founded in 1989). Many of the groups disbanded in the early 1990s after only one album, although several gained an underground following in Europe due to tape trading. Vader became the only one to remain active since its formation, and reached international fan base, with albums charting in Poland, Germany, and Japan, on labels such as Earache Records, Metal Blade Records, and Nuclear Blast among others. While Trauma also remained active since its formation they never reached the same recognition. Since the late 2000s several of the "classic" bands such as Magnus, Armagedon, and Merciless Death have been reformed, and have since remained active.

In the 1990s a second wave of death metal was developed with bands such as Violent Dirge, Lost Soul, Hazael, Hate, Pandemonium (all founded in 1990), Cerebral Concussion later renamed Devilyn, Prophecy, Dies Irae (all founded in 1992), Sceptic (founded in 1994), Decapitated, and Yattering (both founded in 1996). The highly technical music of Violent Dirge became the interest of influential label Nuclear Blast who later released the groups sampler. Although Violent Dirge dissolved in 1995 after the release of several demos, and two underground albums with success remaining only in Poland. Hazael was also subject of interest from eastern record label Century Media Records. But after signing a contract, and recording the album for the label they were dropped. This eventually lead to the break up of the band in 1996. However, they went on to reform in 2014.

Recognition in Europe led bands such as Devilyn to get signed to Listenable Records, Yattering a recording deal with Season of Mist for their second release, and Prophecy signed to Koch International. After losing popularity Prophecy went on hiatus in 1999, and reformed in 2004, but eventually split-up in 2010, while Devilyn, and Yattering disbanded in 2006. Hate after several underground albums reached international recognition in the 2000s after signing to Listenable Records, and later Napalm Records, Dies Irae, reformed in 2000 consisting of members of Vader signed to Metal Blade Records, and released three albums, until the death of their drummer.

In late 1990s Decapitated was signed to Wicked World a subsidiary of Earache Records. The band released several albums, later reaching international acclaim after reforming in 2009, and a new recording deal with Nuclear Blast. After reforming in 1997 Lost Soul signed with Relapse Records to release their debut album, in 2006 the band went in hiatus, and lost their minor popularity in Europe. They once again reformed in 2009 and signed to an underground Polish label, they occasional tour in their home country. In the early 2000s with the release of third album Sceptic signed to Candlelight Records. After only touring in Poland the label eventually dropped Sceptic from their catalogue. Other minor Polish death bands active mostly in the European underground scene include Stillborn (founded in 1997), Azarath (founded in 1998), Deivos (founded in 1999) and Masachist (founded in 2006) among others. Although founded in 1991 as a black metal band Behemoth reached international acclaim from their mixture of black metal with death metal, with one album certified Gold in Poland and three charting on the Billboard 200 in the US.

=== Thrash metal ===
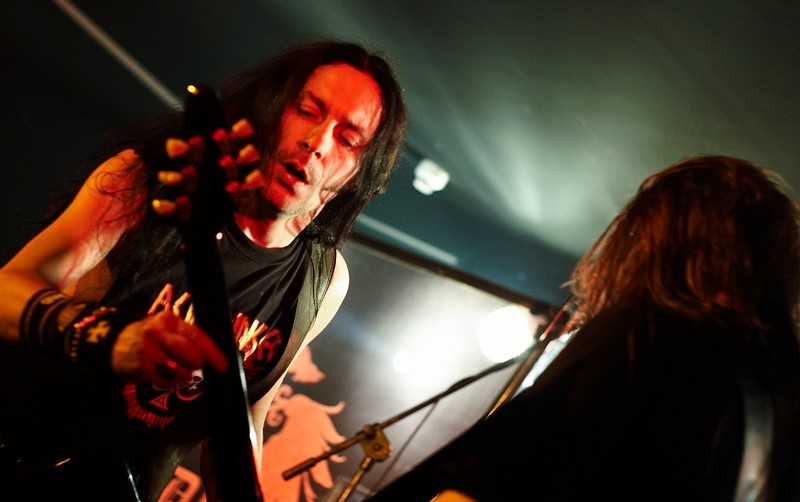
Tomasz Pukacki of Acid Drinkers one of the most popular Polish thrash metal bands; pictured in 2007

In the early 1980s, in response to the American thrash metal wave, Poland developed their own thrash metal scene. Bands of this period include Kat (founded in late 1979), who started as a speed/heavy metal group, Turbo (founded in 1980), who had origins in rock and heavy metal, as well as some strict thrash metal bands such as Kreon, Dragon (both founded in 1984), Destroyers, Hammer (both founded in 1985), Quo Vadis, Alastor, Hunter, Wolf Spider, Acid Drinkers (all founded in 1986), and Egzekuthor (founded in 1987), among others. The 1980s is also when the thrash metal scene in Poland had the most success, with bands finding a starting place in the Metalmania festival (based in Katowice). Bands like Destroyers, Hamer, Dragon, and Wolf Spider became the subjects of interest of national record labels Pronit and Polton, with the bands sharing recordings on split albums. Destroyers continued performing until early 1990; their later albums were released by the national labels Tonpress and Polskie Nagrania Muza. Wolf Spider, after four albums, disbanded in 1991; they later reformed in 2011. Dragon, in later years, developed a death metal influenced style, and they remained active until 2000 with five albums released. Hamer, after reforming several times, remain active.

Turbo, with their popularity based on the protest song "Dorosłe dzieci", switched to a thrash metal sound after two albums released only in Poland. Several attempts to cross over the Polish border have been made by Turbo with English language albums, which have been released by the German label Noise Records, the Italian label Metal Master Records, and the British label Under One Flag (a subsidiary of Music for Nations). Due to problems receiving passports, Turbo remains a local act; they have disbanded and reformed several times, have released eleven albums, and are still active. The band Kat had taken a similar approach; after several singles released in Poland, they signed to Belgian Ambush Records to release their debut album. Due to being unable to tour outside Poland, Kat remains local, with several Polish language albums released. Kat reformed several times over the years; they remain active solely as a studio project. After a name dispute in the early 2000s the act named Kat & Roman Kostrzewski continues with their legacy.

Acid Drinkers is another Polish band that attempted to tour outside home country. In the years after the revolutions of 1989, Acid Drinkers members revoked their passports, but after problems with visas, it occurred to them that they needed to eventually stop their protests. They remain active only in Poland and have received cult status with fifteen albums released, several of which have appeared on Polish Albums Charts. Other bands like Quo Vadis and Alastor remain active in underground scenes to incorporate in later years to their music groove, death or progressive metal. Egzekuthor disbanded in 1992 after one album, reformed in 2002 to be disbanded in 2008 before second studio effort was released. While Hunter have waited till 1995 to release first album reached acclaim in Poland with 2000s albums. Although over the years moving away from strict thrash metal style Hunter received nomination to Fryderyk, an annual award in Polish music, within several records on Polish Albums Chart have been noted, with songs to receive regular airplay. In later years several thrash metal band have emerged while none have reached the acclaim of those from the 1980s. Some of them include Geisha Goner (founded in 1990), Tuff Enuff (founded in 1992), Flapjack, Myopia (both founded in 1993), Horrorscope (founded in 1996), Virgin Snatch, and Alkatraz (both founded in 2001).

=== Gothic metal ===
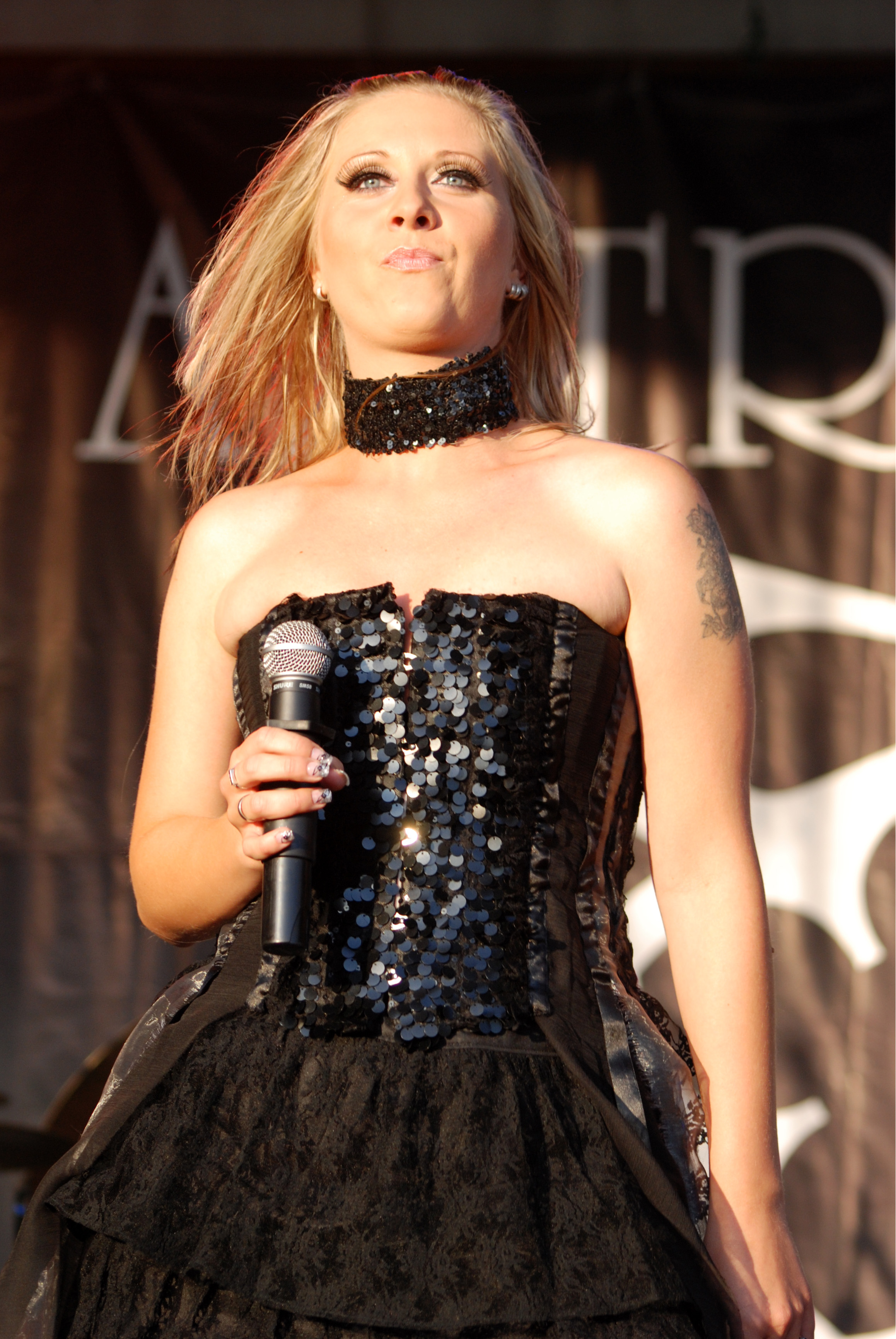
Magdalena "Medeah" Dobosz, vocalist of one of the most popular Polish gothic metal bands, Artrosis; pictured in 2009

Poland developed their gothic metal scene in the 1990s, although it was intertwined with the gothic rock movement since the beginning, focused around the Castle Party Festival founded in 1994. The scene was loosely inspired by Polish bands such as Closterkeller, Pornografia, Fading Colours (all founded in the 1980s), and in later years by British acts like Paradise Lost, My Dying Bride, Anathema, and Norwegian Theatre of Tragedy among others. The earliest of the Polish gothic bands developed their sound from various styles like rock, black, death and doom metal, that include Battalion d'Amour (founded in 1989), Neolithic, Moonlight (both founded in 1991), Sacriversum, Sirrah (both founded in 1992), Hermh, Cemetery of Scream (both founded in 1993), Hefeystos, and Tower (both founded in 1994) among others. Most Polish gothic metal bands since the 1990s reached recognition only in Poland, or for short time in Europe. Compared with the black or death movement, gothic metal is a minor music scene.

Although considered as a rock band, Closterkeller developed a gothic metal sound in the late 1990s. With nine both native and English language albums released up to 2011 they became the most influential Polish gothic band. Battalion d'Amour with their poetic lyrics reached popularity with 1990s albums, which was lost after a change of the group's lead vocalist in the early 2000s. The band released their last album in 2005. Neolithic signed to French Adipocere Records developed a doom and progressive metal influenced sound. They released two albums and disbanded in 2006 with brief recognition in their home country. Moonlight active until 2007 released several albums in 2000s, combining a gothic metal style with trip hop and rock. Reformed several of times of the years, Hermh began as a gothic metal act before switching to symphonic black metal with vampire themed lyrics, and remains a studio project. Cemetery of Scream with five albums released is still active. Hefeystos, with a progressive rock influenced sound, released two albums, and eventually disbanded in 2000. While Tower disbanded in the late 1990s, also with two albums released. Only Sirrah reached short-lived recognition in Europe with a recording deal from Music for Nations. Disbanded in 1998, the group was reformed in 2013 and is still active.

The second wave of gothic bands includes Artrosis, Lorien (both founded in 1995), Aion, Desdemona (both founded in 1996), Sator (later renamed Delight; founded in 1997), and Via Mistica (founded in 1998), among others. Artrosis quickly reached popularity in Poland with albums released by local label Morbid Noizz Productions. In the late 1990s Artrosis became the subject of interest from Tilo Wolffs label Hall of Sermon which released an English version of one of their albums. The band reached its popularity in the early 2000s with a contract from Metal Mind Productions. The band released seven Polish and four English language albums and remain active. Loriens popularity came with a debut album released by underground labels in Europe, USA, and Australia with promotion from Polskie Radio in their home country. After several line-up changes and one more album released, Lorien disbanded in 2005. Eight years later the group was reformed and is still active. While Aion gained some European acclaim with two albums released by Massacre Records, and Impact Records. In later years the band remained local act with a recording deal from Metal Mind Productions. Eventually changing style to modern heavy metal on their fifth album, Aion disbanded after its release in 2004.

Although Desdemona's debut album was released in Japan, the band became a local act with albums released by Metal Mind Productions, eventually dropping their gothic metal style in favour of industrial with four album released, and a recording deal from Danse Macabre Records. Delight which began as a power metal band reached recognition in Poland with support from extensive touring, and several both Polish and English language albums released in the early 2000s. In 2005 after a performance at Wave Gotik Treffen in Germany Delight was signed to Roadrunner Records, although after one album released the group was disbanded with no official statement. Via Mistica remains a local act with three albums released in the early 2000s. In later years several gothic metal bands have emerged, most of them remaining minor part of Polish heavy metal scene, that include such acts like Mystherium (founded in 2001), Ciryam (founded in 2003), UnSun (founded in 2006), and NeraNature (founded in 2009) among others. Only UnSun reached international acclaim with a recording deal from Century Media Records, and albums charting in Japan, although after two albums the group went on hiatus due to problems with the vocalist's health.

== See also ==
- List of Polish composers
- Culture of Poland
- History of music
- Classical music
- Popular music
