= Metalmania =

Heavy metal music festival in Central Europe

- Genre: Heavy metal
- Dates: Spring
- Locations: Katowice, Poland
- Years active: 1986–2009, 2017

Metalmania was a heavy metal music festival in Central Europe. It was held annually from 1986 to 2009, and returned in 2017. The 2008 event was held on 8 March at Spodek in Katowice, Poland.

== Metalmania 1986 ==
First Day: Super Box, Vincent Van Gogh, 666XHE, Jaguar, Test Fobii, Wolf Spider, Turbo, Killer, Alaska

Second Day: Voodoo, Ferrum, Vader, Dragon, Stos, Kat, Alaska

== Metalmania 1987 ==
First Day: Hammer, Destroyer, Turbo, TSA, Overkill, Running Wild, Helloween

Second Day: Dragon, Stos, Wolf Spider, Open Fire, Kat, Overkill, Running Wild, Helloween

== Metalmania 1988 ==
Lineup: Genocide, Awgust, Hammer, Citron, Wolf Spider, Rage, Kreator, Destroyers, Ossian, Dragon, Turbo

== Metalmania 1989 ==
Lineup: Egzekuthor, Dragon, MCB, Open Fire, Arakain, Gomor, Hammer, Astharoth, Alastor, Turbo, Protector, Sacred Chao, Coroner

== Metalmania 1990 ==
Lineup: Destroyers, Alastor, Dragon, Acid Drinkers, Astharoth, Wolf Spider, Hammer, Turbo, Kreator, Protector, Bulldozer

== Metalmania 1991 ==
Lineup: Egzekuthor, Despair, Vader, Pungent Stench, Holy Moses, Dragon, Massacra, Acid Drinkers, Candlemass, Atrocity

== Metalmania 1992 ==
Lineup: Danger Drive, Sparagmos, Acid Drinkers, Master, Demolition Hammer, Grave, Paradise Lost, Sepultura, Massacre

== Metalmania 1993 ==
Lineup: Betrayer, Sparagmos, Kat, Valdi Moder, Therion, Messiah, Cannibal Corpse, Carcass, Death

== Metalmania 1994 ==
Lineup: Pandemonium, Betrayer, Hazael, Quo vadis, Magnus, Ghost, Vader, Samael, Unleashed, Cannibal Corpse, Morbid Angel

== Metalmania 1995 ==
Lineup: Death, Unleashed, Grave, Samael, Head Like a Hole, Dynamind, Corruption, Mash, Acid Drinkers, Shihad, Quo vadis, Tenebris, Bloodlust

== Metalmania 1996 ==
Lineup: My Own Victim, Power Of Expression, Stuck Mojo, Snapshot, Merauder, Rotting Christ, Moonspell, Tuff Enuff, Acid Drinkers, Manhole, Drain, Fear Factory

== Metalmania 1997 ==
Lineup: Sundown, Alastis, Moonlight, The Gathering, Samael, Moonspell, Tiamat, Alpheratz, Pik, Anathema

== Metalmania 1998 ==
Lineup: Judas Priest, Morbid Angel, Vader, The Gathering, Therion, HammerFall, Dimmu Borgir, Gorefest

== Metalmania 1999 ==
Lineup: Samael, Vader, Grip Inc., Anathema, Turbo, Lacuna Coil, Artrosis, Tower, Christ Agony, Evemaster, Pik

== Metalmania 2000 ==
Lineup: The Sins Of Thy Beloved, Lux Occulta, Moonlight, Behemoth, Artrosis, Katatonia, Theatre of Tragedy, My Dying Bride, Tiamat, Yattering, Opeth

== Metalmania 2002 ==
Lineup: Paradise Lost, Tiamat, Moonspell, Cannibal Corpse, Immortal, Flowing Tears, Thy Disease

== Metalmania 2003 ==
Main Stage: Samael, Saxon, Opeth, Vader, Anathema, Sweet Noise, The Exploited, Marduk, God Dethroned, Malevolent Creation, Enter Chaos, Delight, Lost Soul

Small Stage: Elysium, Crionics, Dominium, Anal Stench, Misteria, StrommoussHeld, Azarath, Never, Vesania, Parricide, Demise

== Metalmania 2004 ==
Main Stage: Soulfly, Moonspell, Tiamat, Morbid Angel, TSA, Michael Schenker Group, Enslaved, Epica, Krisiun, Decapitated, Trauma, Esqarial & Kupczyk

Small Stage: Neolith, Centurion, Luna Ad Noctum, Immemorial, Chainsaw, Tenebrosus, Hedfirst, Shadows Land, Devilyn, Atrophia Red Sun, Asgaard, Bright Ophidia, Spinal Cord

== Metalmania 2005 ==
Main Stage: Cradle of Filth, Apocalyptica, Turbo, Napalm Death, Arcturus, Pain, The Haunted, Dark Funeral, Katatonia, Amon Amarth, Dies Irae, Darzamat, ANJ

Small Stage: Valinor, Dead By Dawn, Naumachia, Abused Majesty, Mess Age, Supreme Lord, Pyorrhoea, Quo vadis, Hell-Born, Hedfirst, Hermh, Thunderbolt

== Metalmania 2006 ==
Main Stage: Therion, Anathema, Moonspell, Nevermore, U.D.O., Acid Drinkers, Unleashed, 1349, Hunter, Soilwork, Hieronymus Bosh, Caliban, Vesania, Evergrey

Small Stage: Belphegor, The Old Dead Tree, Beseech, Centinex, Antigama, The No-Mads, Misanthrope, Corruption, Suidakra, Totem, Shadows Land, Archeon

== Metalmania 2007 ==
Main Stage: Testament, Paradise Lost, My Dying Bride, Blaze Bayley, Entombed, Jørn Lande, Sepultura, Korpiklaani, Crystal Abyss, Zyklon, Destruction, Darzamat + Roman Kostrzewski, Vital Remains

Small Stage: Benediction, Anata, Forever Will Burn, Root, Týr, Wu-Hae, Horrorscope, Deivos, Ciryam, Carnal, Sphere, Witchking

== Metalmania 2008 ==
Main Stage: Megadeth, The Dillinger Escape Plan, Satyricon, Overkill, Vader, Immolation, Artillery, Flotsam and Jetsam, Marduk, Primordial, Inside You, Poison the Well

Small Stage: Stolen Babies, Evile, October File, Mortal Sin, Drone, Demonical, Non-Divine, Izegrim, Wrust, Pandemonium, Carrion

== Metalmania Fest 2009 ==
This edition was held in Warsaw in Stodola club.

Lineup: Carnal, Incite, Exodus, Overkill, Soulfly

== Metalmania 2017 ==
Samael, Arcturus, Coroner, Moonspell, Furia, Sodom, Tygers of Pan Tang, Obscure Sphinx
