= Alive! (Turbo album) =

Live album by Turbo
- Released: 1988 (Poland)
- Recorded: December 30, 1986; April 3, 1987; Katowice
- Genres: Thrash metal, heavy metal
- Length: 37:16
- Labels: Tonpress, Metal Mind Productions

Turbo chronology
Ostatni wojownik (1987)	Alive! (1988)	Epidemie (1989)

Alive! is the first live album by the Polish heavy metal band Turbo. It was released in 1988 through Tonpress. The album was recorded on December 30, 1986, and April 3, 1987, at Metalmania '87 and Metal Battle '86 (Spodek, Katowice). The cover art was created by Jerzy Kurczak.

== Track listing ==
No.	Title	Length
1.	"Seans z wampirem"	6:39
2.	"Kawaleria szatana cz. I"	3:39
3.	"Ostatni grzeszników płacz"	3:48
4.	"Syn burzy"	4:57
5.	"Ostatni wojownik"	9:36
6.	"Żołnierz fortuny"	4:33
7.	"Anioł zła"	4:03

=== Bonus tracks ===
No.	Title	Length
8.	"Planeta śmierci (Metalmania 88')"	-
9.	"Kawaleria Szatana cz. 2 (Metalmania 87'/Metal Battle 86')"	-
10.	"Koń trojański (Metalmania 87'/Metal Battle 86')"	-
11.	"Bogini chaosu (Metalmania 87'/Metal Battle 86')"	-
12.	"Berud's Sword (Metalmania 88')"	-
13.	"Breaking The Law (Jarocin 88')"	-
14.	"AIDS (Metalmania 89')"	-
15.	"Pieśń Sybilii (Metalmania 89')"	-

== Personnel ==
- Wojciech Hoffmann - guitar
- Grzegorz Kupczyk - vocal
- Andrzej Łysów - guitar
- Bogusz Rutkiewicz - bass guitar
- Tomasz Goehs - drums
- Robert "Litza" Friedrich - guitar (tracks 14 and 15)

== Release history ==
Year	Label	Format	Country	Out of print?	Notes
1988	Tonpress	LP	Poland	Yes	Original LP release
1990	Metal Mind Productions	CD	Poland	Yes	CD reissue
2001	Metal Mind Productions	CD	Poland	Yes	CD reissue; bonus track
2008	Metal Mind Productions	CD	Poland	No	CD reissue (Anthology 1980-2008); different track list; bonus tracks
