= Dorosłe dzieci =

Studio album by Turbo
- Released: 1983 (Poland)
- Recorded: Rozgłośnia PR studio, Szczecin, July, August, November 1982
- Genre: Heavy metal
- Length: 38:05 (LP); 56:27 (CD)
- Language: Polish
- Label: Polton, Metal Mind Productions
- Producer: Janusz Maślak

Turbo chronology
Dorosłe dzieci (1983)	Smak ciszy (1985)

Reissue CD Cover

Dorosłe dzieci is the first studio album by the Polish heavy metal band Turbo. It was released in 1983 in Poland through Polton. The album was recorded in July, August and November 1982 at Rozgłośnia Polskiego Radia studio, in Szczecin. The cover art was created by Alek Januszewski and photographs by Antoni Zdebiak.

== Track listing ==
No.	Title	Writer(s)	Length
1.	"Szalony Ikar" (eng. Insane Icarus)	Hoffmann/Kupczyk/Sobczak	3:35
2.	"Przegadane dni" (eng. Overtalked days)	Hoffmann/Sobczak	4:10
3.	"W sobie" (eng. In itself)	Hoffmann	5:00
4.	"Ktoś zamienił" (eng. Someone swapped)	Hoffmann/Tara	3:20
5.	"Pozorne życie" (eng. Apparent life)	Kupczyk/Sobczak	3:10
6.	"Toczy się po linie" (eng. It rolls on a wire)	Hoffmann/Sobczak	5:00
7.	"Nie znaczysz nic" (eng. You mean nothing)	Hoffmann/Sobczak	3:25
8.	"Mówili kiedyś" (eng. They once said)	Tomczak/Sobczak	3:05
9.	"Dorosłe dzieci" (eng. Grown-up children)	Hoffmann/Sobczak	7:20

Bonus tracks
No.	Title	Length
10.	"Jak w ogień" (eng. Like in fire)	5:09
11.	"Fabryka keksów (live)" (eng. The fruit cake factory)	12:43
12.	"Coraz mniej" (eng. Getting less)
13.	"Pierwsza forsa w tym miesiącu" (eng. First money this month)	-
14.	"Ach, nie bądź taki śmiały" (eng. Ah, don't be so bold)	-

== Personnel ==
Turbo

- Grzegorz Kupczyk - vocal
- Wojciech Hoffmann - guitar
- Piotr Przybylski - bass guitar
- Andrzej Łysów - guitar
- Wojciech Anioła - drums

Production

- Dorota Zamolska - editing
- Piotr Madziar, Przemysław Kućko - engineer
- Antoni Zdebiak - photography
- Janusz Maślak - producer

== Release history ==
Year	Label	Format	Country	Notes
1982	Polton	LP	Poland	Original LP release
1992	Polton	CD	Poland	CD reissue; different cover
1999	Metal Mind Productions	CD	Poland	CD reissue; original cover; bonus tracks
2009	Metal Mind Productions	CD	Poland	CD reissue; original cover; bonus tracks; videoclip; remastered
