= Ostatni wojownik =

Studio album by Turbo
- Released: 1987 (Polish edition), 1988 (English edition)
- Recorded: May–September 1987 at Giełda studio, Poznań (Polish edition); March 1988 at Musiclab Studio, Germany (English edition)
- Genre: Thrash metal
- Length: 36:36
- Label: Pronit (Polish edition), Noise Records (English edition), Metal Mind Productions
- Producer: Tomasz Dziubiński (Polish edition), Harris Johns (English edition)

Turbo chronology
Kawaleria Szatana (1986)	Ostatni wojownik (1987)	Alive! (1988)

Alternative cover
- Last Warrior cover art (English version)

Ostatni wojownik is the fourth studio album by the Polish heavy metal band Turbo. It was released in 1987 in Poland through Pronit. The album was recorded in May–September 1987 at Giełda studio, Poznań. The cover art was created by Jerzy Kurczak. The album was also issued as a cassette by Polton, with different cover artwork. The 2001 rerelease of Ostatni wojownik has a bonus track and a different song order.

The English version of the album entitled Last Warrior was released in 1988 in Germany through Noise Records. The album was recorded in March 1988 at Musiclab Studio in Germany. The cover art was created by Don Maitz, and photos by Maciej Głowaczewski.

== Track listing ==
Polish version
No.	Title	Length
1.	"Ostatni wojownik"	6:41
2.	"Miecz Beruda"	7:07
3.	"Anioł zła"	3:50
4.	"Seans z wampirem"	6:28
5.	"Bogini chaosu"	5:35
6.	"Koń trojański"	6:55
7.	"Syn burzy" (bonus track)	4:30

English version
No.	Title	Length
1.	"The Last Warrior"	6:41
2.	"Berud's Sword"	7:09
3.	"The Trojan Horse"	6:57
4.	"Seance With Vampire"	6:29
5.	"Tempest's Son"	4:29
6.	"Goddess of Confusion"	5:34
7.	"Angel From Hell"	3:47
8.	"Planeta śmierci (live)" (bonus track)	6:22
9.	"Ostatni wojownik" (bonus track)	6:41
10.	"Miecz Beruda" (bonus track)	3:32
11.	"Seans z wampirem" (bonus track)	6:28

== Personnel ==
Turbo

- Grzegorz Kupczyk - vocal, keyboard
- Wojciech Hoffmann - guitar, backing vocal
- Bogusz Rutkiewicz - bass guitar
- Andrzej Łysów - guitar, backing vocals
- Tomasz Goehs - drums, backing vocals

Production (Polish edit.)

- Zbigniew Suchański - engineer assistant
- Piotr Madziar - engineer
- Tomasz Dziubiński - producer
- Jerzy Kurczak - cover art

Production (English edit.)

- Harris Johns - producer, engineer, mixing
- Don Maitz - cover art

== Release history ==
Year	Label	Format	Country	Notes
1987	Pronit	LP	Poland	Ostatni wojownik original LP release
1988	Noise Records	LP	Germany	Last Warrior original LP release
1999	Metal Mind Productions	CD	Poland	Last Warrior CD reissue; bonus track
2001	Metal Mind Productions	CD	Poland	Ostatni wojownik CD reissue
2009	Metal Mind Productions	CD	Poland	Last Warrior CD reissue; remastered; bonus tracks
