= One Way (Turbo album) =

Studio album by Turbo
- Released: 1992
- Recorded: 1992 at Giełda studio, Poznań
- Genre: Thrash metal, heavy metal
- Length: 38:09 (1992 CC); 47:24 (2009 CD reissue)
- Label: Carnage, Metal Mind Productions
- Producer: Wojciech Hoffmann

Turbo chronology
| Dead End (1990) | One Way (1992) | Awatar (2001) |

One Way is the seventh studio album by the Polish heavy metal band Turbo. It was released, on CC only, in 1992 through Carnage. The album was recorded in 1992 at Giełda studio in Poznań. The cover art was created by Radosław Kaczmarek and Mariusz Łechtański, and photographs by Włodzimierz Kowaliński.

== Track listing ==
| No. | Title | Length |
|---|---|---|
| 1. | "Introduction" | 1:50 |
| 2. | "End user" | 3:57 |
| 3. | "Regression" | 3:41 |
| 4. | "Mental alienation" | 3:56 |
| 5. | "Blasphemy" | 4:09 |
| 6. | "Refuse to live" | 5:37 |
| 7. | "One Way" | 4:40 |
| 8. | "Forgetfulness" | 4:56 |
| 9. | "The Viper" | 4:19 |
| 10. | "Scum" | 5:35 |
| 11. | "Disaster Area" | 4:44 |

== Personnel ==
=== Turbo ===
- Wojciech Hoffmann – guitar
- Marcin Białożyk – guitar, vocals
- Radosław Kaczmarek – bass guitar, vocals
- Sławomir Bryłka – drums
- Tomasz Goehs – drums

=== Production ===
- Radek Kaczmarek – cover concept
- Włodzimierz Kowaliński – photography
- Wojciech Kurkowski – assistant
- Jacek Frączek – assistant
- Piotr "MaDcs" Madziar – engineering
- Wojciech Hoffmann – producer
- Mariusz Łechtański – cover art

== Release history ==
| Year | Label | Format | Country | Notes |
|---|---|---|---|---|
| 1992 | Carnage | CC | Poland | Original CC release |
| 2000 | Metal Mind Productions | CD | Poland | CD reissue; with Dead End album |
| 2009 | Metal Mind Productions | CD | Poland | CD reissue; remastered; different track list; bonus tracks |
