= Strażnik Światła =

Studio album by Turbo
- Released: November 16, 2009
- Recorded: 2009
- Genre: Heavy metal
- Length: 63:37
- Language: Polish
- Label: Metal Mind Productions

Turbo chronology
Tożsamość (2005); Identity (2006)	Strażnik Światła (2009)	Piąty żywioł (2013); The Fifth Element (2014)

Professional ratings
Review scores
Source	Rating
Teraz Rock	3.5/5 stars

Strażnik Światła is the tenth studio album by the Polish heavy metal band Turbo. It was released in 2009 in Poland through Metal Mind Productions. The album was recorded in 2009. This is the band's first album with the new singer, Tomasz Struszczyk, and also the first concept album by Turbo.

== Track listing ==
No.	Title	Length
1.	"Prolog"	1:54
2.	"Na progu życia"	5:25
3.	"Szept sumienia"	7:12
4.	"Strażnik światła"	8:21
5.	"Na skrzydłach nut"	6:34
6.	"Niebezpieczny taniec"	5:27
7.	"Obietnica lepszego dnia"	3:42
8.	"Tunel"	7:01
9.	"Na przekór nocy"	6:31
10.	"Noc już woła"	8:05
11.	"Epilog"	3:24
12.	"Epilog (acoustic demo version)" (bonus track)	3:23

== Personnel ==
Turbo

- Tomasz Struszczyk - vocal
- Wojciech Hoffmann - guitar
- Bogusz Rutkiewicz - bass guitar
- Dominik Jokiel - guitar
- Tomasz Krzyżaniak - drums

Production

- Bogusz Rutkiewicz - mastering
- Maciej Staniecki - mixing
- Krzysztof Tonn mixing
- Daniel Jokiel - photography
- Agata Weiske - cover art
- Tomasz Dziubiński - executive producer
