= Smak ciszy =

Studio album by Turbo
- Released: 1985 (Poland)
- Recorded: January 26 – March 15, 1985
- Studio: Teatr STU studio, Kraków
- Genre: Heavy metal
- Length: 39:20 (LP); 61:42 (CD)
- Language: Polish
- Label: Klub płytowy "Razem", Metal Mind Productions
- Producer: Marek Wajcht, Krzysztof Domaszczyński

Turbo chronology
Dorosłe dzieci (1983)	Smak ciszy (1985)	Kawaleria Szatana (1986)

Smak ciszy is the second studio album by the Polish heavy metal band Turbo. It was released in 1985 in Poland through Klub płytowy "Razem". The cover art was created by Jacek Brzosowski and photographs by Andrzej Szozda.

Smak ciszy is dedicated to Iron Maiden.

== Track listing ==
No.	Title	Writer(s)	Length
1.	"Smak ciszy" (eng. The taste of silence)	Hoffmann/Sobczak	0:21
2.	"Już nie z tobą" (eng. Not with you anymore)	Kupczyk	3:43
3.	"Wybieraj sam" (eng. Choose for yourself)	Hoffmann/Sobczak	4:30
4.	"Czy mnie nie ma" (eng. If I don't exist)	Hoffmann/Rutkiewicz/Sobczak	4:42
5.	"Słowa pełne słów" (eng. Words full of words)	Hoffmann/Sobczak	4:30
6.	"Wszystko będzie O.K." (eng. Everything will be OK)	Hoffmann/Sobczak	4:30
7.	"Jaki był ten dzień?" (eng. How was this day?)	Hoffmann/Sobczak	4:37
8.	"Cały czas uczą nas" (eng. All the time they teach us)	Tomczak/Kupczyk/Sobczak	3:54
9.	"Wariacki taniec" (eng. Mad dance)	Hoffmann/Sobczak	4:00
10.	"Narodziny demona" (The birth of a demon)	Łysów	4:26

Bonus tracks
No.	Title	Length
11.	"Smak ciszy (radio version)"	4:08
12.	"Gdy uszy zatka kurz" (eng. When ears get clogged with dust)	2:55
13.	"Cały czas uczą nas (radio version)"	3:32
14.	"Już nie z tobą (radio version)"	2:54
15.	"Jaki był ten dzień (radio version)"	5:25
16.	"Wariacki taniec (radio version)"	4:17

== Personnel ==
Turbo

- Grzegorz Kupczyk - vocal
- Wojciech Hoffmann - guitar
- Bogusz Rutkiewicz - bass guitar
- Andrzej Łysów - guitar
- Alan Sors - drums

Production

- Jacek Brzosowski - artwork
- Halina Jarczyk - engineer assistant
- Andrzej Szozda - photography
- Krzysztof Domaszczyński - producer
- Marek Wajcht - producer
- Jacek Mastykarz - recording
- Dodek Żywioł - technician

== Release history ==
Year	Label	Format	Country	Notes
1985	Klub płytowy "Razem"	LP	Poland	Original LP release
2000	Metal Mind Productions	CD	Poland	CD reissue
2009	Metal Mind Productions	CD	Poland	CD reissue; remastered; bonus tracks
