= Hidden dimension =

Hidden Dimension may refer to:

== Book ==
- Edward T. Hall#The Hidden Dimension

== Film ==
- Richard Robbins (composer)#Filmography

== Music ==
- Artrosis#Albums
