= Dead End (Turbo album) =

Studio album by Turbo
- Released: 1990 (England)
- Recorded: 1990 at Giełda studio, Poznań
- Genres: Thrash metal, death metal
- Length: 35:26 (LP); 43:04 (CD); 73:47 (2000' edition)
- Labels: Under One Flag, Polskie Nagrania "Muza", Metal Mind Productions
- Producer: Tomasz Dziubiński

Turbo chronology
| Epidemie (1989) | Dead End (1990) | One Way (1992) |

Dead End is the sixth studio album by the Polish heavy metal band Turbo. It was released in 1990 in the United Kingdom through Under One Flag. The album was recorded in 1990, at Giełda studio, Poznań. The cover art was created by Jerzy Kurczak and photographs by Jacek Sroka.

== Track listing ==
| No. | Title | Length |
|---|---|---|
| 1. | "Introduction" | 1:09 |
| 2. | "Everyone" | 4:15 |
| 3. | "Barbaric Justice" | 4:39 |
| 4. | "Blind Alley" | 4:34 |
| 5. | "Annihilate" | 3:30 |
| 6. | "Enola Gay" | 4:17 |
| 7. | "Evolution" | 4:02 |
| 8. | "The Raven" | 5:23 |
| 9. | "Dead End" | 3:54 |
| 10. | "Mortuary" (bonus track) | 2:39 |
| 11. | "Prophetic Sound" (bonus track) | 4:42 |
| 12. | "Red Inter Show (soundtrack)" (bonus track) | - |

== Personnel ==
Turbo

- Robert "Litza" Friedrich – vocal, guitar
- Wojciech Hoffmann – guitar
- Tomasz Olszewski – bass guitar
- Tomasz Goehs – drums
- Tomasz Dziubiński - producer
- Piotr "MaDcs" Madziar - engineering
- Jacek Frączek - assistant
- Jerzy Kurczak - artwork
- Jacek Sroka - photography

== Release history ==
| Year | Label | Format | Region | Notes |
|---|---|---|---|---|
| 1990 | Under One Flag | LP | United Kingdom | Original LP release |
| 1990 | Under One Flag | CD | United Kingdom | CD reissue; bonus tracks |
| 1991 | Polskie Nagrania "Muza" | LP | Poland | LP reissue |
| 2000 | Metal Mind Productions | CD | Poland | CD reissue; with One Way album |
| 2008 | Metal Mind Productions | CD | Poland | CD reissue |
| 2009 | Metal Mind Productions | CD | Poland | CD reissue; remastered; bonus tracks |
