= Kawaleria Szatana =

Studio album by Turbo
- Released: 14 January 1986 (Poland)
- Recorded: December 1985–January 1986 at Giełda studio, Poznań
- Genre: Thrash metal
- Length: 39:30
- Language: Polish
- Label: Pronit, Metal Mind Productions
- Producer: Ryszard Gloger

Turbo chronology
Smak ciszy (1985)	Kawaleria Szatana (1986)	Ostatni wojownik (1987)

Professional ratings
Review scores
Source	Rating
Teraz Rock	3.5/5 stars

Kawaleria Szatana (Polish Satan's Cavalry) is the third studio album by the Polish heavy metal band Turbo. It was released in 1986 in Poland through Pronit. The album was recorded in from December 1985 to January 1986 at Giełda studio, Poznań. The cover art was created by Zbigniew Kosmalski.

Kawaleria Szatana is considered to be one of the most important albums in the history of Polish rock.

== Track listing ==
No.	Title	Length
1.	"Żołnierz fortuny" (eng. Soldier of Fortune)	3:55
2.	"Dłoń potwora" (eng. Monster's Hand)	5:10
3.	"Sztuczne oddychanie" (eng. Artificial Respiration)	2:55
4.	"Kometa Halleya" (eng. Halley's Comet)	5:25
5.	"Kawaleria Szatana cz. I" (eng. Satan's Cavalry, pt. I)	3:55
6.	"Wybacz wszystkim wrogom" (eng. Forgive All Enemies)	6:45
7.	"Kawaleria Szatana cz. II" (eng. Satan's Cavalry, pt. II)	3:40
8.	"Ostatni grzeszników płacz" (eng. Last Sinners Cry)	4:00
9.	"Bramy galaktyk" (eng. Galaxies Gates) (instrumental)	3:45

== Personnel ==
Turbo

- Grzegorz Kupczyk - vocal
- Wojciech Hoffmann - guitar, vocal
- Bogusz Rutkiewicz - bass guitar
- Andrzej Łysów - guitar, vocal
- Alan Sors - drums

Production

- Ryszard Gloger - engineer
- Zbigniew Kosmalski – graphics
- Piotr Madziar - recording
- Piotr Szczepański - recording

== Release history ==
Year	Label	Format	Country	Notes
1986	Pronit	LP	Poland	Original LP release
1999	Metal Mind Productions	CD	Poland	CD reissue; digipack
2009	Metal Mind Productions	CD	Poland	CD reissue; remastered; digipack
