= Tożsamość =

Studio album by Turbo
- Released: December 13, 2004 (Polish edit.); February 28, 2005 (English edit.)
- Recorded: 2004, Poland
- Genre: Heavy metal, Thrash metal
- Length: 55:35; 72:33 (bonus CD)
- Label: Metal Mind Productions

Turbo chronology
Awatar (2001)	Tożsamość (2004)	Strażnik Światła (2009)

Professional ratings
Review scores
Source	Rating
Teraz Rock	4/5 stars

Tożsamość is the ninth studio album by the Polish heavy metal band Turbo. It was released on December 13, 2004, in Poland through Metal Mind Productions. The album was recorded in 2004 in Poland. The cover art was created by Maciej Piotrowski and photographs by Grzegorz Kupczyk. The live performance on the Akustycznie bonus CD was recorded on December 16, 2003, at the Blue Note club in Poznań.

English version of the album entitled Identity was released on February 28, 2005.

== Track listing ==
No.	Title	Lyrics	Music	Length
1.	"Paranoja"	Grzegorz Kupczyk	Wojciech Hoffmann, Bogusz Rutkiewicz, Tomasz Krzyżaniak	6:08
2.	"Samotnia"	Kupczyk	Hoffmann, Rutkiewicz, Krzyżaniak	4:40
3.	"Legenda Thora"	Kupczyk	Hoffmann, Rutkiewicz, Krzyżaniak	5:35
4.	"Człowiek i Bóg"	Kupczyk	Hoffmann, Rutkiewicz, Krzyżaniak	7:05
5.	"Eneida" (instrumental)		Hoffmann, Rutkiewicz, Krzyżaniak	8:37
6.	"Maqmra"	Kupczyk	Hoffmann, Rutkiewicz, Krzyżaniak	5:33
7.	"Pismo"	Kupczyk	Hoffmann, Rutkiewicz, Krzyżaniak	9:55
8.	"Otwarte drzwi do miasta"	Kupczyk	Hoffmann, Rutkiewicz, Krzyżaniak	8:01

Bonus tracks
No.	Title	Length
8.	"Legend of Thor"	5:35
9.	"The Scroll"	9:55
10.	"Szalony Ikar (2008 version)"	–

Akustycznie (Limited edition bonus CD)
No.	Title	Length
1.	"Powitanie"	0:22
2.	"Ach! Nie bądź taki śmiały"	3:27
3.	"Wszystko będzie OK"	4:36
4.	"Kawaleria szatana II"	4:43
5.	"Cały czas uczą nas"	4:08
6.	"Coraz mniej"	4:38
7.	"Szalony Ikar"	3:39
8.	"Fabryka keksów"	8:50
9.	"Czy mnie nie ma"	4:34
10.	"Lęk"	4:09
11.	"Pozorne życie"	3:02
12.	"Smak ciszy"	4:20
13.	"Dorosłe dzieci"	7:43
14.	"Już nie z tobą"	3:37
15.	"Wybieraj sam"	4:43
16.	"Jaki był ten dzień"	6:02

English edition
No.	Title	Lyrics	Music	Length
1.	"Legend Of Thor"	Grzegorz Kupczyk	Wojciech Hoffmann, Bogusz Rutkiewicz, Tomasz Krzyżaniak
2.	"Maqmra"	Kupczyk	Hoffmann, Rutkiewicz, Krzyżaniak
3.	"The Man and the God"	Kupczyk	Hoffmann, Rutkiewicz, Krzyżaniak
4.	"Paranoia"	Kupczyk	Hoffmann, Rutkiewicz, Krzyżaniak
5.	"Eneida" (instrumental)		Hoffmann, Rutkiewicz, Krzyżaniak
6.	"Hemirtage"	Kupczyk	Hoffmann, Rutkiewicz, Krzyżaniak
7.	"Scroll"	Kupczyk	Hoffmann, Rutkiewicz, Krzyżaniak
8.	"Opened Doors of the City"	Kupczyk	Hoffmann, Rutkiewicz, Krzyżaniak

== Personnel ==
Turbo

- Grzegorz Kupczyk – vocals
- Wojciech Hoffmann – guitar, acoustic guitar, twelve-string guitar
- Dominik Jokiel – guitar
- Bogusz Rutkiewicz – bass guitar
- Tomasz "Krzyżyk" Krzyżaniak – drums

Production

- Wojciech Hoffman and Turbo – production
- Bogusz Rutkiewicz – mastering
- Artur Szalowski – mixing, sound engineering
- Tomasz Dziubiński – executive producer
- Maciej Piotrowski, Grzegorz Kupczyk, Tomasz Jankowski – photography

== Charts ==
=== Monthly ===
Year	Chart	Position
2005	Poland (ZPAV Top 100)	48

== Release history ==
Year	Label	Format	Country	Notes
December 13, 2004	Metal Mind Productions	CD	Poland	Polish edition
January 17, 2005	Metal Mind Productions	CD	Poland	Polish edition with bonus live CD
January 28, 2005	Metal Mind Productions	CD	Poland	English edition
September 7, 2009	Metal Mind Productions	CD	Poland	Polish edition re-release
