= Satellite (Polish band) =

Polish neo-prog band

- Origin: Poland
- Genres: Progressive rock; neo-prog
- Years active: 2000–present
- Labels: Metal Mind
- Members: Robert Amirian; Sarhan Kubeisi; Krzysztof Palczewski; Jarosław Michalski; Wojtek Szadkowski
- Past members: Krzysztof Narbut; Mirek Gil; Dariusz Lisowki; Piotr Żaczek; Przemysław Zawadzki; Zbigniew Bieniak

Satellite is a Polish neo-prog band. It was founded in 2000 by ex-Collage drummer Wojtek Szadkowski as a quartet, with Sarhan Kubeisi on guitar, Robert Amirian as vocalist and bassist, and Krzysiek Palczewski on keyboards.

Their debut album, A Street Between Sunrise and Sunset, was released on 10 March 2003 by Metal Mind Productions. Its follow-up, Evening Games, was released in February 2005, and reached no. 8 at the top 100 best selling records in Poland.

At the beginning of June 2005, regular rehearsals helped develop Satellite as a real band and not just Wojtek's solo studio project. As a result, Satellite recorded the live DVD Evening Dreams (2006) on 22 September 2005.

In March 2007 the band played at the Baja Prog Festival in Mexico and, in November of the same year, they released their third studio album entitled Into the Night. Since then, they have added the bassist Jarek Michalski to the band.

In 2009, Satellite returned with a brand new album, Nostalgia, which was released by Metal Mind Productions (MMP) on 23 February 2009 in Europe and on 10 March 2009 in USA. Most of the album was recorded in Wojtek Szadkowski's home studio. He is also responsible for the album's music and lyrics. The music on this album is a combination of the sound of the 1970s and modern 21st century sound.

== Discography ==
=== Studio albums ===
Title	Album details	Peak chart positions
Title	Album details	POL
A Street Between Sunrise and Sunset	Released: 24 March 2003; Label: Metal Mind Productions	—
Evening Games	Released: 31 January 2005; Label: Metal Mind Productions	38
Into the Night	Released: 3 December 2007; Label: Metal Mind Productions	—
Nostalgia	Released: 23 February 2009; Label: Metal Mind Productions	30
"—" denotes a recording that did not chart or was not released in that territory.

=== Videos albums ===
Title	Album details
Evening Dreams	Released: 27 December 2005; Label: Metal Mind Productions; Formats: DVD
