= Turbo (Polish band) =

Polish heavy metal band

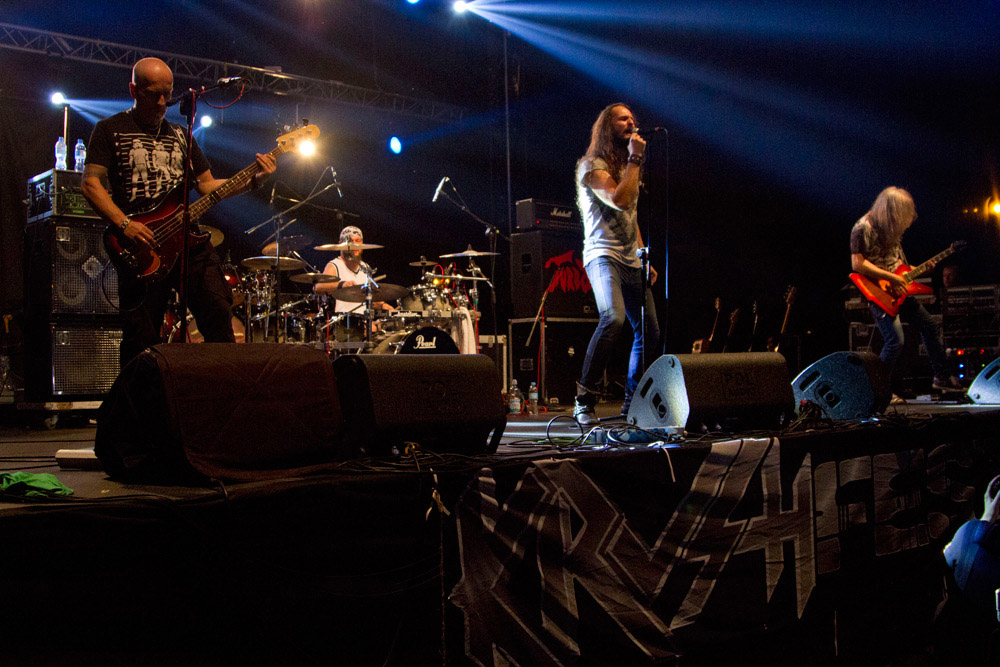

Background information
- Origin: Poznań, Poland
- Genres: Heavy metal, thrash metal
- Years active: 1980–present
- Labels: Tonpress, Metal Mind, Under One Flag, Polskie Nagrania "Muza", Polton, Metalmaster, Kopart, Pronit, Noise, Agencja Artystyczna MTJ, Klub płytowy "Razem", Phonex
- Members: Wojciech Hoffmann; Bogusz Rutkiewicz; Mario "Bobiś" Bobkowski; Krzysztof "Tercjusz" Kurczewski; Tomasz Struszczyk
- Website: turboband.pl

Turbo is a Polish heavy metal band. It was started in 1980 in Poznań by Henryk Tomczak (formerly in Stress and Heam, both pioneering Polish hard rock groups). Turbo has been described as one of the most important bands in Polish heavy metal. Turbo's most famous album is Kawaleria Szatana (Satan's Cavalry), considered an opus of Polish heavy metal. The band is best known for the tracks "Dorosłe Dzieci", "Jaki był ten dzień", "Żołnierz fortuny" and "Wszystko będzie ok".

== History ==
=== 1980–1989 ===
The first line-up was Wojciech Hoffmann (guitar), Wojciech Anioła (drums) and Wojciech Sowula (vocals). Soon a single was released, the tracks being "W środku tej ciszy" ("Deep in the Silence") and "Byłem z tobą tyle lat" ("So many years with you"). The band's style then was very much like 1970s or early 1980s hard rock. In November 1980, the singer left and was replaced by Piotr Krystek. New tracks were recorded and frequently played on the radio. Soon more line-up changes came, the original founder and bass guitarist left. 16-year-old Piotr Przybylski took his place. Andrzej Łysów joined as second guitarist and the singer was changed once again. Since then Turbo's vocals have been by Grzegorz Kupczyk, one of the most famous Polish heavy metal singers, sometimes compared to Bruce Dickinson.

In 1983, the first album was released, entitled Dorosłe dzieci (Grown-up Children). Its music is a blend of traditional hard rock and NWOBHM. The title track has become a hit and the most recognizable Turbo song. With the LP recorded, the group played extensively, including at Rockowisko in Łódź and the famous Jarocin festival. Despite the success, the line-up continued to change: successive drummers were Marek Olszak, Ryszard Oleksy and Przemysław Pahl. Finally, the drummer's place was taken by Alan Sors. Piotr Przybylski (bass guitar) left and was replaced Bogusz Rutkiewicz.

Apart from problems with the line-up, the band had other difficulties to address. The record company insisted on softening the band's sound and recording more 'catchy' tracks. Wojciech Hoffman later called that "a time of mistakes and distortion". In 1985, a compromise, softened LP, Smak ciszy (The Taste of Silence), was recorded. Despite the sound being relatively soft, the riffing resembles Iron Maiden and the vocals give the music more heaviness. The charting songs were "Smak Ciszy" and "Jaki był ten dzień" ("How That Day Was").

A year later, Turbo recorded an LP that became one of the best Polish heavy metal albums of all time – Kawaleria Szatana (Satan's Cavalry). Heavy riffing, Iron Maiden-like soloing and lyrics dealing with typically 'heavy' themes such as death, war and pain, completely changed the band's image. The LP was very successful and is still considered to be the group's greatest effort. After the release Turbo collaborated with Metal Mind Records, which enabled then to play at the Metalmania festival.

In 1987, the band recorded another LP, Ostatni wojownik (Last Warrior. An English-language version was released in Europe a year later). It was the first album for the new drummer, Tomasz Goehs. The band's style hardened even more, influenced by early Metallica, as did the lyrics, even darker than before. In 1988, the first live recording, Alive!, was released, containing material recorded at gigs on 12 December 1986 and 3 March 1987.

=== 1989–2000 ===
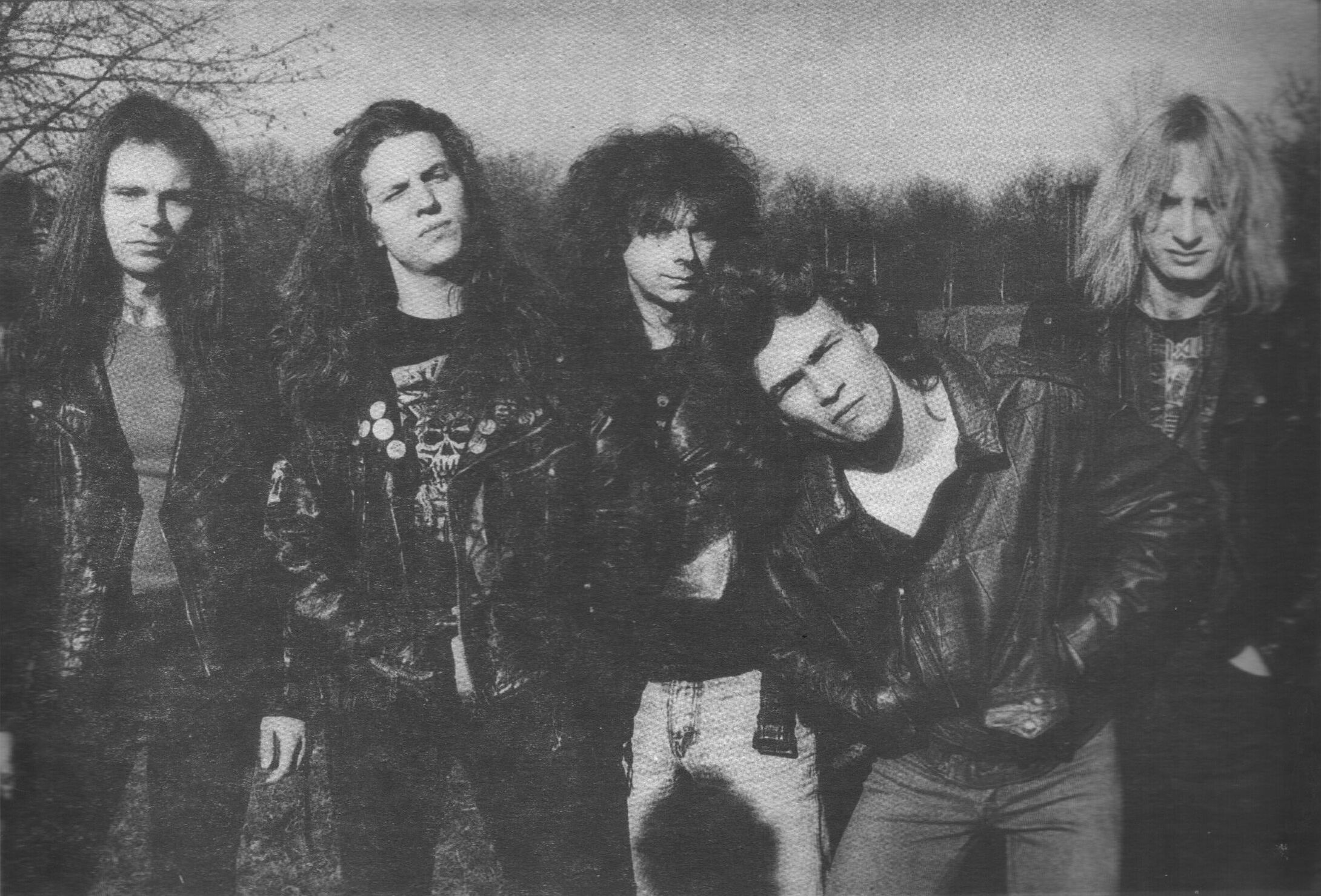
Turbo in the 1990s

With 1989 came several changes in the line-up – Bogusz Rutkiewicz quit, Andrzej Łysów took bass instead of guitar, and Acid Drinkers' Robert "Litza" Friedrich became the new guitarist. Influenced by Anthrax, Flotsam and Jetsam and Wolf Spider the musicians recorded Epidemie (later English edition, Epidemic), a highly technical thrash album.

In 1990 a break-up occurred, when Grzegorz Kupczyk and Andrzej Łysów quit the band. Tomasz Olszewski joined on bass, and the new singer was Robert "Litza" Friedrich. This line-up went on, creating Dead End which featured somewhat death metal vocals, but the songs' structures are still thrash. The break-up and lack of concerts would cause the band's hiatus. A compilation of 1980–1990 songs was released, containing tracks unreleased before.

Wojciech Hoffman tried to form a new line-up in 1992, releasing One Way (tapes only), but the effort turned out to be a commercial loss and Turbo finally ceased.

The following years, several compilation albums were released – 1992's Titanic, with unreleased songs from the 'softened times', and a year later Dorosłe Dzieci i inne ballady (Grown-up Children and other ballads) – a collection of all Turbo ballads.

In 1995 Turbo played at a gig in Poznań, the line-up being Wojciech Hoffmann, Grzegorz Kupczyk, Bogusz Rutkiewicz together with Marcin Białożyk – guitar and Szymon Ziomkowski – drums. The applause caused the group to reform, and on 1 January 1996 Turbo regrouped. In 1997 another compilation was released, this time entitled Intro: 1982–1996, composed of most popular songs. In 1999 Metal Mind Records released the Turbo discography on CD. The band played at the Thrash'em All and Metalmania festivals.

=== 2000–present ===
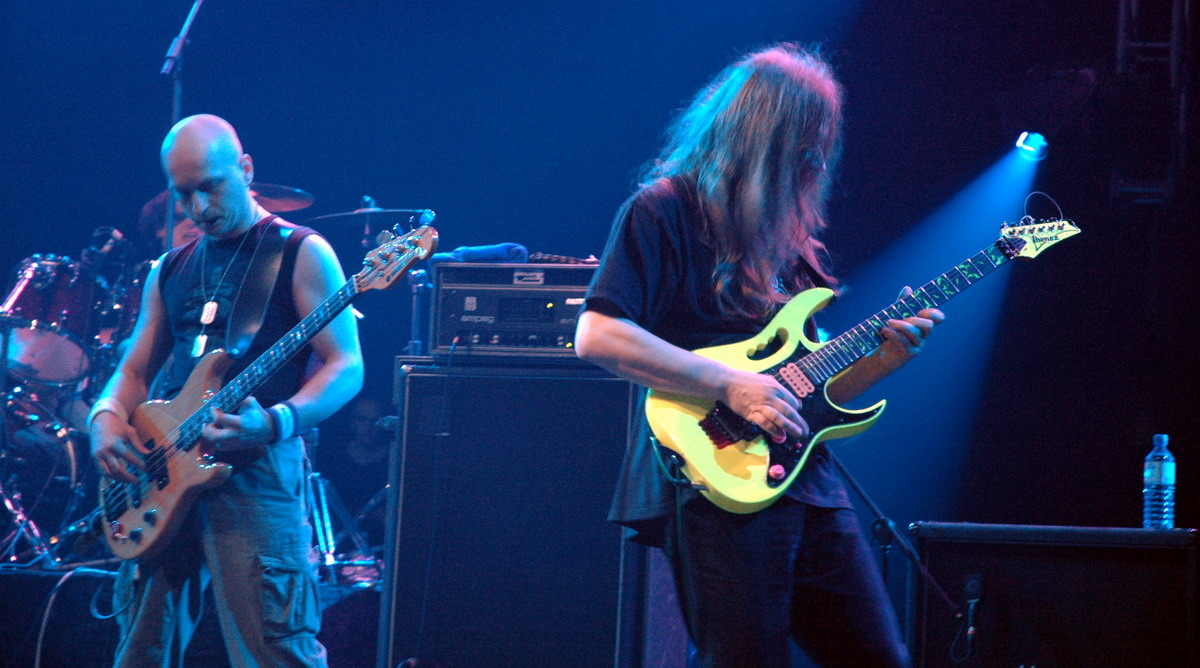
Turbo at Metalmania 2005 in Poland

In 2000, a remastered version of Titanic was released, called Remix '92. In January 2000, Turbo played at a gig celebrating Grzegorz Kupczyk's 25 years on stage. The gig was released as a CD, titled 20012000.

In 2001, after a ten-year break, another LP was released. Awatar (The Avatar) was an experimental, new-sounding album, influenced by modern hard rock. The experiments were disapproved of by heavy metal diehards, who rated the album very poorly. The line-up formed was Hoffmann, Kupczyk i Rutkiewicz and Mariusz Bobkowski (drums).

In 2004, Turbo returned with Wojciech Hoffmann, Grzegorz Kupczyk, Bogusz Rutkiewicz and Tomek Krzyżaniak (drums) and Dominik Jokiel (guitar). The Tożsamość (Identity) LP was released, a return to pure heavy metal. The diehard public considered it to be an excellent come back, while others claimed the group was repetitive. In 2005, a limited edition of Tożsamość together with Akustycznie (a record of the acoustic performance XII 2003) was released. The band went to Metalmania and released the gig as a live DVD.

Because of unresolved problems with the record company, and a bad music market situation, the band ceased once again. Wojciech Hoffman began a solo career, Grzegorz Kupczyk worked with his band CETI, and Bogusz Rutkiewicz joined Gotham.

In March and April 2007, the group took part in the Metal Marathon Tour 3 with Chainsaw, Turbo's first tour since 2001.

In 2009, Metal Mind Productions released remastered versions of all Turbo albums, including One Way. Also in 2009, Turbo released a new album, Strażnik Światła, with a new member, Tomasz Struszczyk, on vocals. On this album, the band returned to the classic heavy metal music style.

== Members ==
=== Current members ===
- Wojciech Hoffmann – guitar (1980–1992, 1995–present)
- Bogusz Rutkiewicz – bass (1983–1988, 1995–present)
- Mario "Bobiś" Bobkowski – drums (2000–2001, 2011–present)
- Tomasz Struszczyk – vocals (2007–present)
- Przemysław Niezgódzki – guitar (2018–present)

=== Former members ===
- Wojciech Sowula – vocals (1980)
- Piotr Krystek – vocals (1980–1981; died 2012)
- Henryk Tomczak – bass (1980–1981)
- Wojciech Anioła – drums (1980–1983)
- Piotr Przybylski – bass (1981–1983)
- Andrzej Łysów – guitar (1981–1988), bass (1988–1990)
- Grzegorz Kupczyk – vocals (1981–1990, 1995–2007)
- Alan Sors – drums (1983–1986)
- Tomasz Goehs – drums (1986–1991)
- Robert Friedrich – guitar (1988–1991), vocals (1990–1991)
- Tomasz Olszewski – bass (1990–1991)
- Radosław Kaczmarek – bass (1991–1992)
- Marcin Białożyk – guitar (1991–1992, 1995–2001), vocals (1991–1992)
- Szymon Ziomkowski – drums (1995–2000)
- Tomasz Krzyżaniak – drums (2001–2011)
- Dominik Jokiel – guitar (2001–2014; died 2022)
- Krzysztof Kurczewski – guitar (2014–2017)

== Discography ==
=== Studio albums ===
Title	Album details	Peak chart positions
Title	Album details	POL
Dorosłe dzieci	Released: 1983 (Polish edit. only); Label: Polton; Formats: CD, CS, LP, digital download	—
Smak ciszy	Released: 1985 (Polish edit. only); Label: Klub Płytowy Razem/Merimpex; Formats: CD, CS, LP, digital download	—
Kawaleria Szatana	Released: 1986 (Polish edit. only); Label: Pronit/PZN ZWiN; Formats: CD, CS, LP, digital download	—
Ostatni wojownik / Last Warrior	Released: 1987 (Polish edit.), 1988 (English edit.); Label: Pronit/Polton/Noise Records; Formats: CD, CS, LP	—
Epidemie / Epidemic	Released: 1989 (Polish edit.), 1990 (English edit.); Label: Metalmaster Records/Polskie Nagrania Muza; Formats: CD, CS, LP	—
Dead End	Released: 1990 (English edit. only); Label: Under One Flag/Polskie Nagrania Muza; Formats: CD, digital download	—
One Way	Released: 1992 (English edit. only); Label: Carnage Records; Formats: CD, CS, digital download	—
Awatar	Released: 21 May 2001 (Polish edit.), 2001 (English edit.); Label: Metal Mind; Formats: CD, digital download	21
Tożsamość / Identity	Released: 13 December 2004 (Polish edit.), 28 February 2005 (English edit.); Label: Metal Mind; Formats: CD, digital download	—
Strażnik Światła	Released: 16 November 2009 (Polish edit. only); Label: Metal Mind; Formats: CD, digital download	—
Piąty żywioł / The Fifth Element	Released: 12 November 2013 (Polish edit.), 3 March 2014 (English edit.); Label: Metal Mind; Formats: CD, digital download	48
Blizny	Released: 01 February 2025 (Polish edit.); Label: Mystic Production; Formats: CD, digital download	—
"—" denotes a recording that did not chart or was not released in that territory.

=== Live albums ===
Title	Album details	Notes
Alive!	Released: 1988; Label: Polmark/Tonpress/Metal Mind; Formats: CD, CS, LP	
Akustycznie	Released: 7 September 2009; Label: Metal Mind; Formats: CD, digital download	originally released as bonus CD with Tożsamość
In The Court of the Lizard	Released: 6 October 2014; Label: Metal Mind; Formats: CD	

=== Compilation albums ===
Title	Album details
1980–1990	Released: 1990; Label: Tonpress/Tomax/Metal Mind; Formats: CD, LP, CS
Titanic	Released: 1992; Label: Phonex Records; Formats: CS
Dorosłe dzieci... i inne ballady	Released: 1994; Label: Dża Dża Records; Formats: CS
Intro 1982–86	Released: 1998; Label: Koart; Formats: CD
Remix'92	Released: 2000; Label: Agencja Artystyczna MTJ; Formats: CD, CS, digital download
Anthology 1980–2008	Released: 1 September 2008; Label: Metal Mind; Formats: CD+DVD (box)

=== Video albums ===
Title	Video details
The History 1980–2005	Released: 30 January 2006; Label: Metal Mind; Formats: DVD
In The Court of the Lizard	Released: 6 October 2014; Label: Metal Mind; Formats: DVD

=== Music videos ===
Year	Title	Directed	Album
1982	"Ach nie bądź taki śmiały"	—	1980–1990
1982	"Coraz mniej"	—	1980–1990
1982	"Jak w ogień"	—	Dorosłe dzieci
1983	"Pozorne życie"	—	Dorosłe dzieci
1983	"Dorosłe dzieci"	—	Dorosłe dzieci
1983	"Toczy się po linie"	—	Dorosłe dzieci
1985	"Smak ciszy"	—	Smak ciszy
1985	"Cały czas uczą nas"	—	Smak ciszy
2001	"Armia"	—	Awatar
2010	"Na progu życia"	Jacek Raginis	Strażnik światła
2013	"Cień wieczności"	Dariusz Świtała	Piąty żywioł
2013	"Myśl i walcz"	Dominik Jokiel	Piąty żywioł
