= Epidemic (album) =

Epidemie
- Epidemic cover art (English version)

Studio album by Turbo
- Released: 1989 (Polish version), 1990 (English version)
- Recorded: March–May 1989 at Giełda studio, Poznań
- Genre: Heavy metal, thrash metal
- Length: 37:31
- Label: Polskie Nagrania Muza (Polish version), Metalmaster (English version)

Turbo chronology
Alive! (1988)	Epidemie (1989)	Dead End (1990)

Epidemie (Epidemics) is the fifth studio album by the Polish heavy metal band Turbo. It was released in 1989 in Poland through Polskie Nagrania Muza. In 1990 an English version of the album entitled Epidemic was released through Metalmaster Records.

The album was recorded in March–May 1989 at Giełda studio in Poznań. The cover art was created by Jerzy Kurczak.

== Track listing ==
Polish version
No.	Title	Length
1.	"Salvator Mundi"	3:52
2.	"AIDS"	4:47
3.	"Ocean Łez"	4:40
4.	"Pętla Czasu"	4:47
5.	"Szalony Świat"	4:53
6.	"Anty R. J. Ewa"	4:33
7.	"Rozkosz I Ból"	4:08
8.	"Gniazdo Smutku"	5:08
9.	"13.12.88"	0:43

English version
No.	Title	Length
1.	"Salvator Mundi"	3:58
2.	"AIDS"	4:45
3.	"Ocean of Tears"	4:37
4.	"Loop of Time"	4:43
5.	"Crazy World"	5:02
6.	"Anty N.R. Eve"	4:36
7.	"Pleasure and Pain"	4:14
8.	"Den of Sorrow"	5:14
9.	"13.12.88"	0:46

== Personnel ==
Turbo

- Grzegorz Kupczyk – vocal
- Wojciech Hoffmann – guitar
- Robert "Litza" Friedrich – guitar
- Andrzej Łysów – bass guitar
- Tomasz Goehs – drums
- Tomasz Dziubiński - producer
- Jerzy Kurczak - artwork
