= Sirrah (band) =

Polish progressive gothic metal band

- Origin: Opole, Poland
- Genres: Progressive metal Gothic metal Avant-garde metal Death-doom; Symphonic metal (early); Industrial metal (later)
- Years active: 1992–1999, 2013-present
- Labels: Melissa Productions, Music for Nations, Metal Mind Productions, Pony Canyon
- Members: Roman Bereźnicki; Michał Bereźnicki; Paweł Nafus; Roger Trela; Krzysztof Passowicz; Magdalena Brudzińska; Tomo Żyżyk
- Past members: Sławomir Lisiecki; Christopher; Bartosz "Bart" Rojewski; Maciej "Matt" Pasiński; Bai'Sahr; Maggie
- Website: sirrahofficial.net

Sirrah (also spelled SIRRAH, or SIЯRAH, as on their logo) is a progressive gothic metal band from Southwestern Poland. They formed in 1992, released two albums, and disbanded in 1999 due to financial issues. Their music includes elements from death metal, doom metal, and later industrial metal. After their break up, Tom (vocals), Matt (death vocals, guitar), and Chris (keyboards) went on to form a progressive/avant-garde industrial metal band called The Man Called TEA. The band reunited in 2013 and immediately began recording new material, releasing a downloadable single on their new website.

== Members ==
=== Current line-up ===
- Roman Bereźnicki - bass guitar, vocals
- Michał Bereźnicki - drums
- Paweł Nafus - guitars
- Roger Trela - guitars
- Krzysztof Passowicz - keyboards
- Magdalena Brudzińska - violin, vocals
- Tomo Żyżyk - vocals

=== Past members ===
- Sławomir Lisiecki - bass guitar
- Christopher - bass guitar
- Bartosz "Bart" Rojewski - drums
- Maciej "Matt" Pasiński - guitars
- Bai'Sahr - guitars
- Maggie - vocals

== Discography ==
=== Albums ===
Title	Album details	Peak chart positions
Title	Album details	Finland
Acme	Released: 1995; Label: Melissa Productions; Formats: CS	—
Acme (re-recorded version)	Released: September 9, 1996; Label: Metal Mind, Music for Nations, Pony Canyon; Formats: CS, CD	—
Did Tomorrow Come...	Released: May 28, 1997; Label: Metal Mind, Music for Nations, Pony Canyon; Formats: CS, CD	38
"—" denotes a recording that did not chart or was not released in that territory.

=== EPs ===
Title	EP details
The Stories of Defeats	Released: 1997; Label: Metal Mind; Formats: CS, CD
