= Thy Disease =

Polish industrial metal band

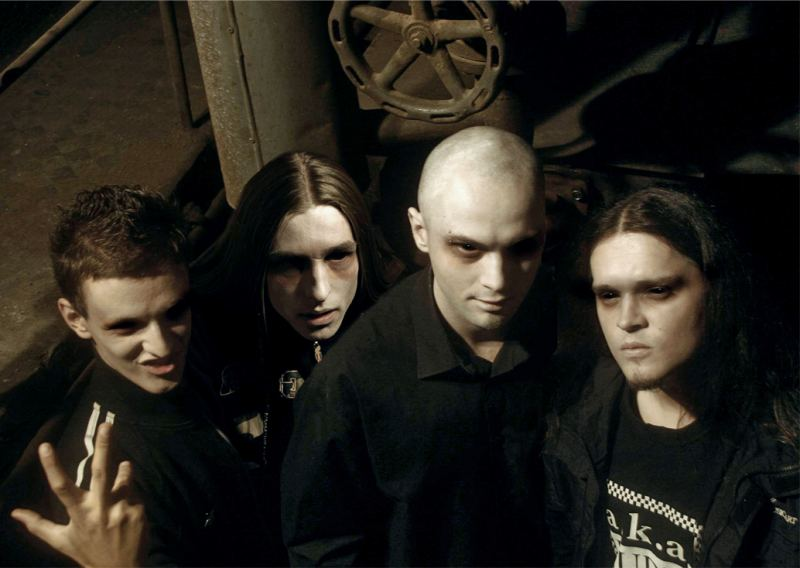

Background information
- Origin: Kraków, Poland
- Genres: Industrial metal Blackened death metal (early)
- Years active: 1999–present
- Labels: Metal Mind, Empire, Mystic, Armoury/Eagle Rock
- Website: thydisease.com

Thy Disease is a Polish industrial metal band from Kraków. Their lyrics deal with nihilism, the apocalypse, and war. The band was formed in 1999 by former members of Sceptic, Anal Stench, and Crionics.

Their fourth album, Rat Age (Sworn Kinds Final Verses), was released in early 2006 under Empire Records. The band's label for the previous three albums was Metal Mind Productions.

== Band members ==
Current members

- Dariusz "Yanuary" Styczeń – guitar, bass guitar, programming (1999–present)
- Piotr "VX" Kopeć – keyboards, synthesizers, effects (2011–present)
- Andrzej Hejmej – bass guitar (2013–present)
- Artyom Serdyuk – bass guitar (2011–2013), guitar (2013–present)
- Ireneusz "Ireq" Gawlik – drums (2012–present)
- Marcin "Regis" Parandyk – vocals (2018–present)

Live members

- Łukasz "Lucass" Krzesiewicz – drums (2011)
- Michał "Waran" Skotniczny – bass guitar (2004–2008)

Former members

- Michał "Psycho" Senajko – vocals (1999–2011)
- Jarosław "Jaro" Baran – keyboards, synthesizers, programming (1999–2001)
- Jakub "Cube" Kubica – keyboards, synthesizers (2001–2011)
- Hiv – bass guitar (1999–2003)
- Marek "Marcotic" Kowalski – bass guitar (2003–2004)
- Krystian "Pinocchio" Skowiniak – drums (1999–2002)
- Maciej "Darkside" Kowalski – drums (2002–2005)
- Jakub "Cloud" Chmura – drums (2005–2011)
- Piotr "Pepek" Woźniakiewicz – guitar (1999–2003)
- Paweł "Paul" Jaroszewicz – drums (2011–2012)
- Marcin "Novy" Nowak – bass guitar (2011–2012)
- Rafał "Brovar" Brauer – bass guitar (2008–2011), guitar (2011–2012)
- Sebastian "Syrus" Syroczyński – vocals (2010–2018)

== Discography ==
Studio albums

- Devilish Act of Creation (2001)
- Cold Skin Obsession (2002)
- Neurotic World of Guilt (2004)
- Rat Age (Sworn Kinds Final Verses) (2006)
- Anshur-Za (2009)
- Costumes of Technocracy (2014)
- 7th Album (2017)

Demos

- Art of Decadence (2000)

Video albums

- Extreme Obsession Live (DVD/VHS, 2004)

Music videos

Year	Title	Directed	Album
2002	"Perfect Form"	Selani Studio	Cold Skin Obsession
2004	"Mean, Holy Species"	Mateusz Górecki	Neurotic World of Guilt
2014	"Slave State"	Marcin Halerz, Red Pig Productions	Costumes of Technocracy
2014	"Holographic Reality"	Marcin Halerz, Red Pig Productions	Costumes of Technocracy
