= Moonlight (band) =

Polish rock band

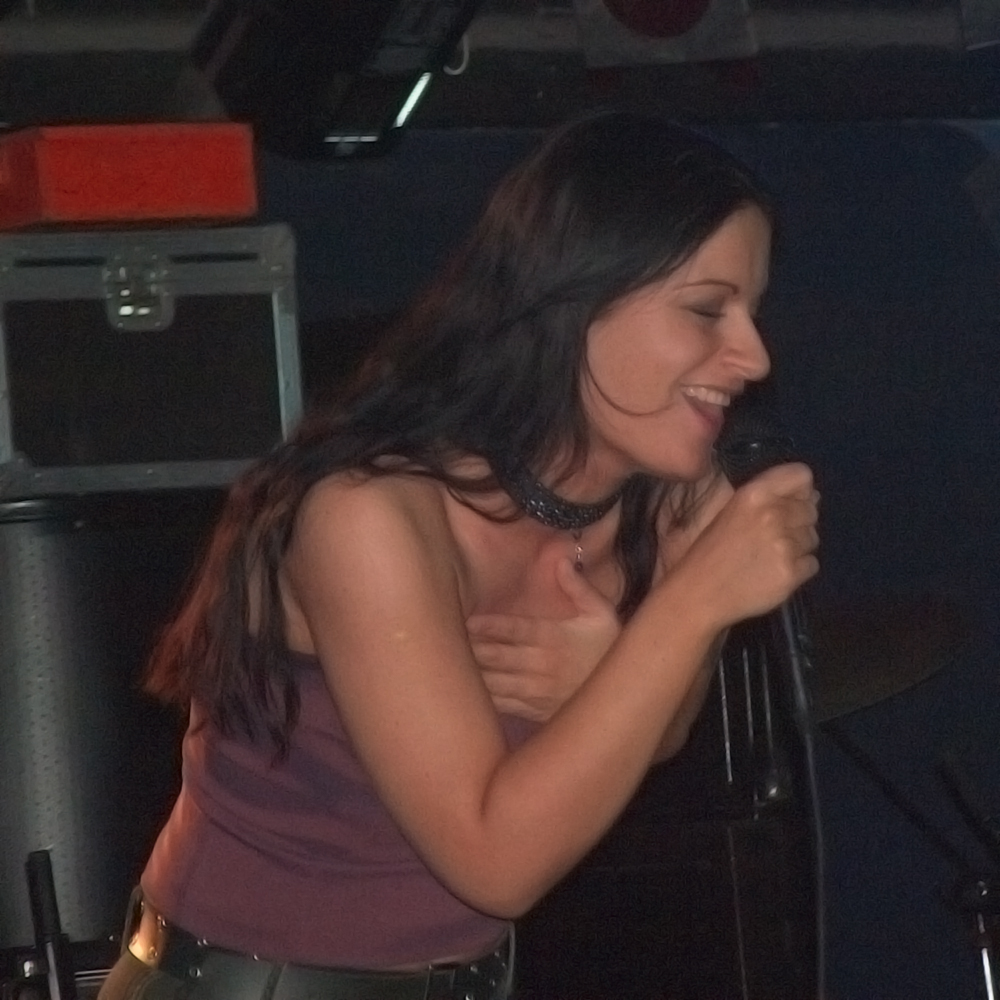
- Maja Konarska, 2003

Background information
- Origin: Szczecin, Poland
- Genres: Gothic metal; progressive rock; art rock; alternative rock
- Years active: 1991–2007, 2015–present
- Labels: Rock’n’Roller, Morbid Noizz, Metal Mind
- Members: Maja Konarska; Daniel Potasz; Paweł Gotłas; Marek Pokorniecki
- Past members: Katarzyna Michalewicz; Arkadiusz Wlazło; Szymon Gebel; Tomasz Kopczyński; Tomasz Wieczorek; Maciej Kaźmierski; Andrzej Kutys; Michał Podciechowski; Kuba Maciejewski; Bolek Wilk

Moonlight is a Polish rock band.

== Discography ==
=== Studio albums ===
Title	Album details	Peak chart positions
Title	Album details	POL
Kalpa Taru	Released: 28 October 1996; Label: Metal Mind Productions	–
Meren Re	Released: March 1997; Label: Metal Mind Productions	–
Inermis	Released: June 1999; Label: Morbid Noizz Production	–
Floe	Released: 20 April 2000; Label: Metal Mind Productions	–
Yaishi	Released: 25 October 2001; Label: Metal Mind Productions	24
Candra	Released: 27 November 2002; Label: Metal Mind Productions	–
Moonlight	Released: 26 May 2003; Label: Metal Mind Productions	–
Audio 136	Released: 24 May 2004; Label: Metal Mind Productions	40
downWords	Released: 31 October 2005; Label: Metal Mind Productions	–
Integrated in the System of Guilt	Released: 13 November 2006; Label: Metal Mind Productions	–
Nate	Released: 19 January 2018	–
"—" denotes a recording that did not chart or was not released in that territory.

=== Live albums ===
Title	Album details
Koncert w Trójce 1991-2001	Released: 9 April 2001; Label: Metal Mind Productions

=== Video albums ===
Title	Video details
Awaken Memories Live	Released: 2003; Label: Metal Mind Productions

=== Music videos ===
Year	Title	Directed	Album
1999	"Flos"	–	Inermis
2000	"List z Raju"	–	Floe
2001	"Meren-Re (Rapsod)"	Łukasz Jankowski	Yaishi
2002	"Ronaa"	–	Candra
2004	"Tindułin"	–	Audio 136
2006	"Plasterek"	Andrzej Kozera	Integrated in the System of Guilt
2006	"Reset"	Andrzej Kozera	Integrated in the System of Guilt
