= Furia (band) =

Polish black metal band

- Origin: Katowice, Poland
- Genres: Black metal
- Years active: 2003–present
- Labels: Death Solution Productions, Pagan Records
- Members: Nihil; Sars; A Namtar

Furia is a Polish black metal band formed in 2003 in Katowice, with Michał "Nihil" Kuźniak on guitar and vocals, Kamil "Sars" Staszałek on bass, Artur "A" Rumiński on guitar and Grzegorz "Namtar" Kantor on drums. It is considered one of the most influential black metal groups in Poland.

The word "furia" means "fury" in the Polish language. The musical style of the band appears raw and "cold", but the lyrics focus mostly on nihilism and misanthropy in a poetic manner, usually striving from typical paganism or anti-Christianity. Some members of Furia play in MasseMord, while the vocalist Nihil – who is also the lyricist – conducts the post-black metal project Morowe.

In 2014, Furia played multiple music festivals across Europe, most notably Primavera Sound in Barcelona, as part of the "Don’t Panic! We're From Poland" project led by the Adam Mickiewicz Institute, which aims to establish new connections for Polish musicians in the industry. The band often performs shirtless.

In 2023, Furia was nominated for Polityka’s Passport, a popular cultural award in Poland, in the Popular Music category, following the release of the band's album "Huta Luna".

== Band members ==
- Michał "Nihil" Kuźniak – vocal, samples, guitar
- Kamil "Sars" Staszałek – bass
- Artur „A" Rumiński – guitar
- Grzegorz "Namtar" Kantor – drums

== Discography ==
=== Studio albums ===
- Martwa Polska Jesień (2007, Death Solution Productions)
- Grudzień za grudniem (2009, Pagan Records)
- Marzannie, Królowej Polski (2012, Pagan Records)
- Nocel (2014, Pagan Records)
- Księżyc milczy luty (2016, Pagan Records)
- w Śnialni (2021, Pagan Records)
- Huta Luna (2023, Pagan Records)

=== Demos ===
- I Spokój (2004, own release)
- I Krzyk (2005, own release)

=== EPs ===
- Płoń (2009, Pagan Records)
- Halny (2010, Pagan Records)
- Huta Laura / Katowice / Królewska Huta (2010, Pagan Records)
- W melancholii (2013, Pagan Records)
- Guido (2016, Pagan Records)
