= Delight (band) =

Polish gothic metal band

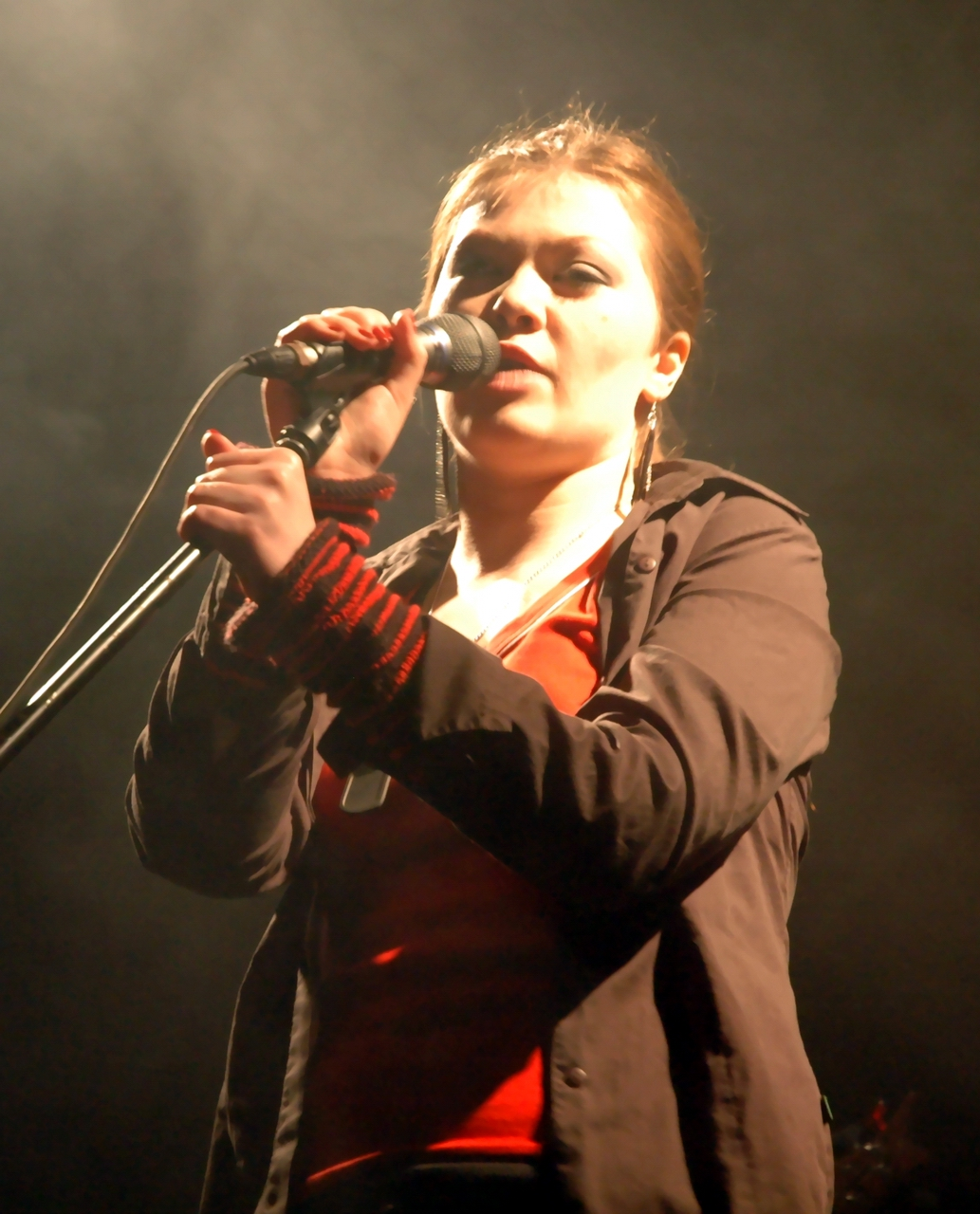
- Paulina "Paula" Maślanka from Delight

Background information
- Origin: Skawina, Poland
- Genres: Alternative metal, gothic metal (early)
- Years active: 1997–2007
- Labels: Metal Mind Productions, Roadrunner Records
- Members: Paula; Jaro; Marek Tkocz; Ziemowit Rybarkiewicz; Cube; Grzegorz Gustof
- Website: www.delight.art.pl

Delight was a Polish gothic metal band.

== Musicians ==
Final line-up

- Paulina "Paula" Maślanka – vocals (1997–2007)
- Jarosław "Jaro" Baran – electric guitar, drums, keyboards (1997–2007)
- Marek Tkocz – bass guitar (2005–2007)
- Ziemowit Rybarkiewicz – drums (2006–2007)
- Jakub "Cube" Kubica – keyboards, programming (2002–2007)
- Grzegorz Gustof – electric guitar (2005–2007)

Session musicians

- Ryan Van Poederooyen – drums (2006)
- Rhys Fulber – keyboards, programming (2006)

Former members

- Daniel Kaczmarczyk – drums (1997–2000)
- Tomasz Baran – drums (2000–2002)
- Piotr Wójcik – drums (2002–2006)
- Tomasz Polczyk – keyboards (1997–2000)
- Barbara Lasek – keyboards (2000–2002)
- Sebastian Wójtowicz – guitar (1997–2003)
- Piotr Szymański – bass guitar (1997–2005)

== Discography ==
Studio albums

- Last Temptation (2000)
- The Fading Tale (2001)
- Eternity (2002)
- Anew (2004)
- Od Nowa (2004)
- Breaking Ground (2007)

Video albums

Title	Album details
The Last Tale of Eternity	Released: September 29, 2003; Label: Metal Mind Productions; Formats: DVD

Music videos

Year	Title	Directed	Album
2001	"Carving the Way"	—	The Fading Tale
2002	"Stained Glass"	—	Eternity
2004	"Emotune"	—	Anew
2004	"Między nami"	—	Od nowa
2006	"Divided"	Dariusz Szermanowicz	Breaking Ground
