= Deivos (band) =

- Origin: Lublin, Poland
- Genres: Death metal
- Years active: 1999–present
- Labels: Butchery Music, Empire Records, Unique Leader Records, Selfmadegod Records
- Members: Hubert Banach; Tomasz Kołcoń; Piotr "Mścisław" Bajus; Kamil Stadnicki; Krzysztof "Wizun" Saran
- Past members: Maciej Nawrocki; Marcin Górniak; Jarosław Pieńkoś
- Website: deivos.pl

Deivos is a four-piece Polish brutal death metal band from Lublin.

== Band history ==
Deivos was formed between 1997 and 1998 by guitarist Tomasz Kołcon of Engraved, guitarist Maciej Nawrocki, and vocalist Marcin Górniak of Ravendusk. The band recorded its first demo, Praised by Generations, in 1999 with the aid of a drum machine. In 2000, drummer Krzysztof Saran of Abusiveness and bassist Jarek Pieńkoś joined the line-up. Near the end of 2001, Nawrocki and Górniak left the band, and Pieńkoś took over the band's vocals. In 2003, Deivos recorded the mini CD Hostile Blood, gaining them popularity in the metal underground as well as a deal with the Butchery Music label. The band's line-up was completed in 2004 with the addition of Abusiveness guitarist Mścisław, and their first full-length album, Emanation from Below, was recorded and released in 2006. In May 2009, the band signed with Unique Leader Records. Unique Leader Records released the band's third studio album, Gospel of Maggots, in February 2010. Then, in 2011, another album was released: Demiurge of the Void.

== Discography ==
- 1999: Praised by Generations (demo)
- 2003: Hostile Blood
- 2006: Emanation from Below
- 2010: Gospel of Maggots
- 2011: Demiurge of the Void
- 2015: Theodicy
- 2017: Endemic Divine
- 2019: Casus Belli
- 2024: Apophenia
