= Artrosis =

Polish gothic metal band

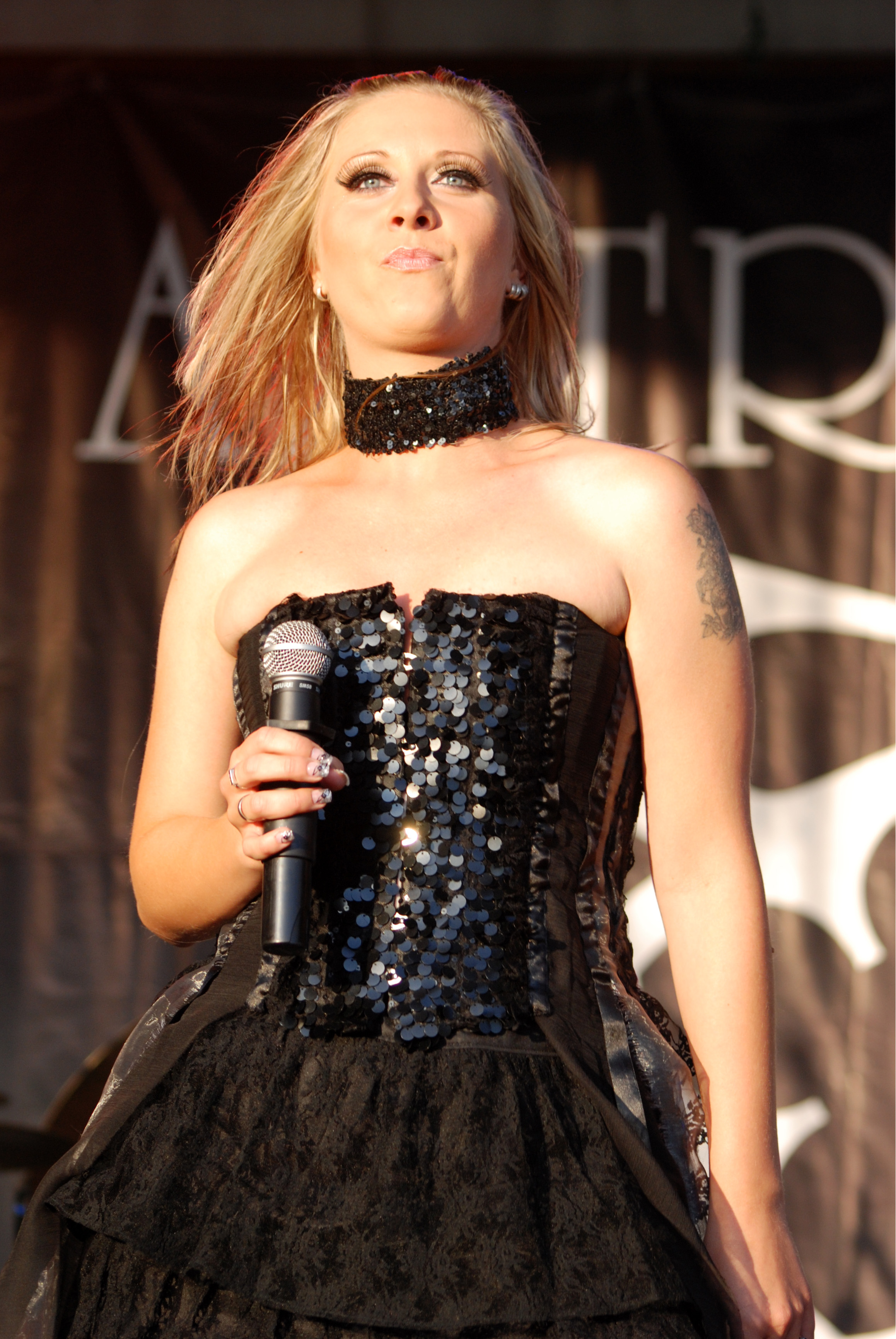
- Magdalena Gołek

Background information
- Origin: Poland
- Genre: Gothic metal
- Years active: 1995–present
- Labels: Metal Mind, Mystic Production

Artrosis is a Polish gothic metal band founded in 1995 in Zielona Góra.

In 2001 the band was nominated for a Fryderyk, an annual award in Polish music.

== Band members ==
Current members

- Magdalena "Medeah" Gołek – vocals, keyboards (1995-)
- Damian „Francuz” Krawczyk – drums (2015 - )
- Krystian „MacKozer” Kozerawski – guitars (2002–2010, 2026- )
- Maciej Żolinas - bass guitar (2021-)
- Justyna Szatny - keyboards (2026-)

Live and session members

- Piotr "Gruby" Milczarek – bass guitar (2011)
- Artur Tabor – guitars (2011)

Past members

- Krzysztof "Chris" Białas – guitars (1995–1999)
- Rafał "Grunthell" Grunt – guitars (1999–2002)
- Mariusz "Mario" Kuszewski – guitars (2003–2004)
- Marcin Pendowski – bass guitar (1998–2001)
- Remigiusz "Remo" Mielczarek – bass guitar (2002–2010)
- Łukasz "Migdał" Migdalski – keyboards (2005–2010)
- Konrad "Lombardo" Biczak – drums (2005–2006)
- Paweł "Świcol" Świca – drums (2006–2010)
- Maciej Niedzielski – keyboards (1995–2005, 2011-)
- Grzegorz "Gregor" Piotrowski – guitars (2011-2015)
- Janusz Jastrzębowski – drums (2011-2015)

== Discography ==
=== Albums ===
Title	Album details	Notes
Ukryty Wymiar	Released: March 17, 1997; Label: Morbid Noizz Productions; Formats: CD, CS	released in 1998 by Morbid Noizz Productions as English-language EP entitled Hidden Dimension; released also in 1999 by Hall of Sermon as English-language version entitled Hidden Dimension; re-recorded and released in 2001 by Metal Mind Productions as two separate Polish and English-language version entitled Hidden Dimension
W Imię Nocy	Released: March 16, 1998; Label: Morbid Noizz Productions; Formats: CD, CS	re-recorded and released in 2001 by Metal Mind Productions as two separate Polish and English-language version entitled In Nomine Noctis
Pośród Kwiatów I Cieni	Released: November 17, 1999; Label: Metal Mind Productions; Formats: CD, CS	released also as English-language version entitled In The Flowers Shade
Fetish	Released: April 24, 2001; Label: Metal Mind Productions; Formats: CD, CS	released also as English-language version under the same title
Melange	Released: November 4, 2002; Label: Metal Mind Productions; Formats: CD	released also as English-language version under the same title
Con Trust	Released: October 2, 2006; Label: Mystic Production; Formats: CD	
Imago	Released: November 7, 2011; Label: Mystic Production; Formats: CD, digital download	
Odi et Amo	Released: June 1, 2015; Label: Artrosis; Formats: CD	

=== Video albums ===
Title	Album details	Notes
Live in Kraków	Released: July 26, 2000; Label: Metal Mind Productions; Formats: VHS	re-released on DVD as Live in Kraków: Among The Flowers And Shadows

=== Live albums ===
Title	Album details
Koncert w Trójce	Released: February 22, 2001; Label: Metal Mind Productions; Formats: CD

=== Music videos ===
Title	Year	Director	Album
"Szmaragdowa Noc"	1997	—	Ukryty wymiar
"Pośród Kwiatów I Cieni"	1999	—	Pośród Kwiatów I Cieni
"Prawda"	2001	—	Fetish
"Wiem"	2002	—	Melange
"Kolej rzeczy?"	2002	—	Melange
"Tym dla mnie jest"	2006	—	Con Trust
"W półśnie"	2006	Aleksandra Tylińska	Con Trust
