= Polton (record label) =

Polish record label

Coordinates: 51°28′08″N 21°26′31″E

- Founded: 1983
- Country of origin: Poland

Polton was a music record label, established in Poland in 1983. It was one of the three (together with Savitor and Arston) better known Polonia-assisted Polish record labels.

In 1990-1991 it was acquiredby Starstream Communications Group and eventually by Warner Music Group (Polton / Warner Music Poland), the latter eventually closed its office in Poland.
