= Metal Mind Productions =

Polish record label

Coordinates: 50.2341°N 19.0069°E

- Founded: 1987
- Founder: Tomasz Dziubiński
- Defunct: 2025
- Distributor: MVD (United States)
- Genre: Rock, heavy metal
- Country of origin: Poland
- Official website: metalmind.com.pl

Metal Mind Productions (MMP) was a Polish record label founded in 1987. The label focused on rock and heavy metal. MMP was also the publisher of the Polish edition of Metal Hammer, the largest and the oldest heavy metal magazine. As a concert agency, it was an organiser of Metalmania, the largest heavy metal event in Central Europe, and it organised over 1000 concerts, including Monsters of Rock in Poland, 1991.

Metal Mind Productions over the years became the subject of criticism from such bands as Malevolent Creation, Enter Chaos, Behemoth and Moonlight among others, for releasing unauthorized records and lack of professionalism. They purchased rights for several albums from Empire Records that include titles from such bands as Totem, Sammath Naur, Dissenter, Deivos, Archeon, Spinal Cord, Demise, Naumachia, and Pyorrhoea. and re-released them in 2007 and 2008 although the musicians were not informed about the deal and were unable to contact Metal Mind.

Metal Mind had a licensing deal with Music for Nations from the 1990s until its closure in 2004. That deal included releases by such bands as Candlemass, Thrasher, Dispatched and Paradise Lost among others. It also had a distribution and licensing deal with Century Media Records that included releases by such bands as Sentenced, Death, Cryptopsy, Arch Enemy, Strapping Young Lad, Jag Panzer, The Gathering, Bloodbath and Massacre among others.

In 2006 Metal Mind Productions signed a multi-licensing deal with Roadrunner Records for their back catalogue. The selection of bands included Solitude Aeturnus, Willard, Trojan, Atrocity, Crimson Glory, Front Line Assembly, Violent Force, Acrophet, Amen, Atrophy, Heathen, Realm, Xentrix, Defiance, Disincarnate, Pestilence, Last Crack, Znowhite, Sadus, Toxik, Bulldozer and Gorguts.

In 2008 the label signed a similar deal with Nuclear Blast for their back catalogue. The selection of bands include Brutallity, Control Denied, Darkane, Disbelief, Dismal Euphony, Destruction, Theatre of Tragedy, Stormwitch, Darkseed, Disharmonic Orchestra, Gardenian, Primal Fear, Farmer Boys, Horde, Hypocrisy, Impulse Manslaughter, Macabre, Mortification, Night in Gales, Slaughter, Abomination, Warhammer and Winter.

On other various licenses Metal Mind Productions released albums by artists such as Ankh, Anvil, Art Rock, Astharoth, Bang Tango, Bank, Blaze Bayley, Believer, Warlock and Wilczy Pająk among others.

In 2010 label founder Tomasz Dziubiński died of neoplasm.

Metal Mind Productions was declared bankrupt in March 2025.

== Bands ==
=== Current ===
- 2TM2,3
- After...
- Agressiva 69
- Alastor
- Andareda
- Anti Tank Nun
- Apostolis Anthimos
- Believe
- Budzy i Trupia Czaszka
- Caamora
- Ceti
- Chemia
- Clive Nolan
- Cochise
- Coria
- Corruption
- Doogie White & La Paz
- Doogie White
- Elvis Deluxe
- Elżbieta Mielczarek
- Exlibris
- Grube Ryby
- Hellectricity
- Jan "Kyks" Skrzek
- Janusz Niekrasz Band
- J. D. Overdrive
- Kasa Chorych
- Kat
- Kruk
- Krzak
- Laboratorium
- Leash Eye
- Mech
- Minerals
- Mr Gil
- Noko
- One Million Bulgarians
- Ordinary Brainwash
- Opprobrium
- Osada Vida
- Pampeluna
- Panzer X
- Paul Di'Anno
- Satellite
- SBB
- Speculum
- Sui Generis Umbra
- Śląska Grupa Bluesowa
- Turbo
- TSA
- WAMI (White Appice Mendoza Iggy)
- Will Wallner & Vivien Vain
- Via Mistica

=== Former ===
- Acid Drinkers
- Aion (disbanded)
- Akurat
- Ani DiFranco
- Anal Stench (disbanded)
- Anathema
- Arena
- Armia
- Artillery
- Artrosis
- Asgaard
- Batalion d'Amour
- Behemoth (Poland only)
- Bright Ophidia
- Carpathian Forest
- Ciryam
- Cemetery of Scream
- Chainsaw
- Closterkeller
- Cree
- Dance on Glass (disbanded)
- Dark Tranquillity (Poland only)
- Darzamat
- Decapitated
- Dezerter
- Delight (disbanded)
- Desdemona
- Dies Irae (disbanded)
- Dragon (disbanded)
- Elysium (disbanded)
- Enter Chaos (disbanded)
- Enslaved
- Final Conflict
- Frontside
- Gordon Haskell
- Gorgoroth
- Grave
- Grzegorz Kupczyk
- Hate
- Hedfirst
- Hetman
- Hunter
- Homo Twist
- Horrorscope
- Izrael
- Jadis
- John Porter
- Józef Skrzek
- Killjoy
- Lizard
- Luna Ad Noctum
- Love De Vice
- Łzy
- Mess Age (disbanded)
- Michael Schenker Group
- Mietek Blues Band
- Moonlight (disbanded)
- Moonspell
- Naamah (disbanded)
- NeraNature
- NewBreed
- Obituary
- Onslought
- Oddział Zamknięty
- Overhead
- Pain
- Pallas
- Patrycja Markowska
- Pendragon
- Perfect
- Retribution
- Rotting Christ
- RPWL
- Sacriversum (disbanded)
- Serpentia
- Shadowland
- Shakin' Dudi
- Sirrah
- StrommoussHeld
- Tenebrosus (disbanded)
- The No-Mads
- Thy Disease
- Tinyfish
- Tomasz Mars
- Tuff Enuff
- Vader (Poland only)
- Vital Remains
- WU-HAE
- Złe Psy
- Ziyo

== See also ==
- Metal Hammer
- Metalmania
- List of record labels
