= Barndt =

Barndt is a surname. Notable people with the surname include:

- Joseph Barndt, American Lutheran pastor and activist
- Isidor Barndt (1816–1891), German poet
- Susan McWilliams Barndt (born 1977), American political theorist
- Tom Barndt (born 1972), American football player
