= Duchy of Nysa =

Silesian duchy (1290–1850)

Coordinates: 50°28′00″N 17°20′00″E

Duchy of Nysa Księstwo Nyskie (pl) Herzogtum Neisse (de) Niské knížectví (cs)
- 1290–1850
- Coat of arms

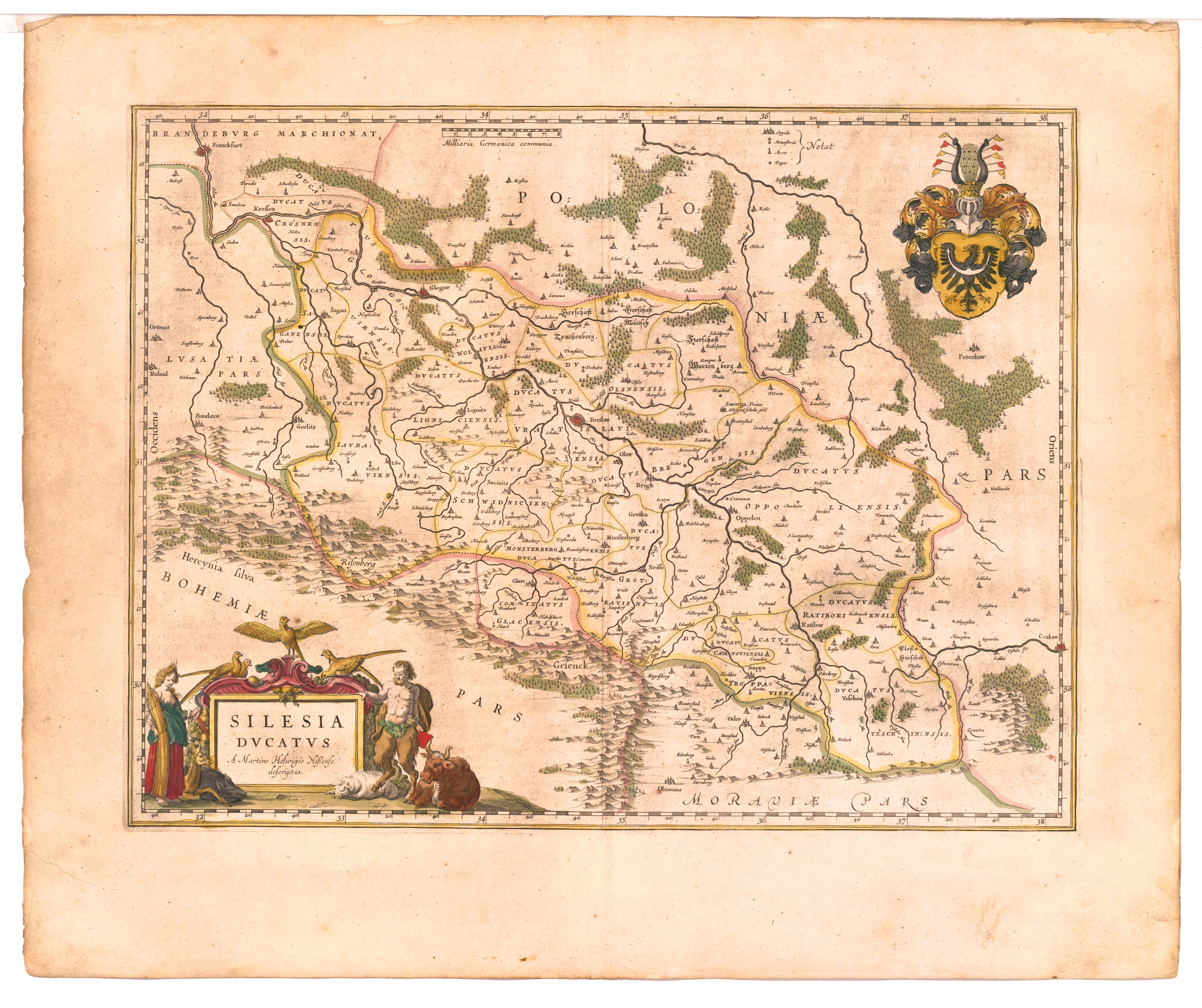
- Map of Silesia by Martin Helwig, native of Nysa, published in 1645 in Atlas novus of Willem and Joan Blaeu. The Duchy of Nysa (here depicted as DVCATUS GROTKAVIENSIS) extends to Jeseník (Freiwaldau) in the south and Osoblaha (Hotzenplotz) in the east.
- Status: Silesian duchy
- Capital: Nysa
- Historical era: Middle Ages; Early modern period
  - Partitioned from Wrocław: 1290
  - Vassalized by Bohemia: 1342
  - Acquired Grodków: 1344
  - Partitioned by Prussia and Austria: 1742
  - Incorporated by Prussia: 1810
  - Seized by Austria: 1850
Preceded by	Succeeded by
Duchy of Wrocław / Duchy of Silesia	Silesia Province / Kingdom of Prussia; Austrian Silesia / Austrian Empire
- Today part of: Poland; Czechia

The Duchy of Nysa (Polish: Księstwo Nyskie, Czech: Niské knížectví) or Duchy of Neisse (German: Herzogtum Neisse) was one of the duchies of Silesia with its capital at Nysa in Lower Silesia. Alongside the Duchy of Siewierz, it was the only ecclesiastical duchy in the Silesian region, as it was ruled by a bishop of the Catholic Church. Nowadays its territory is divided between Poland and the Czech Republic.

== History ==
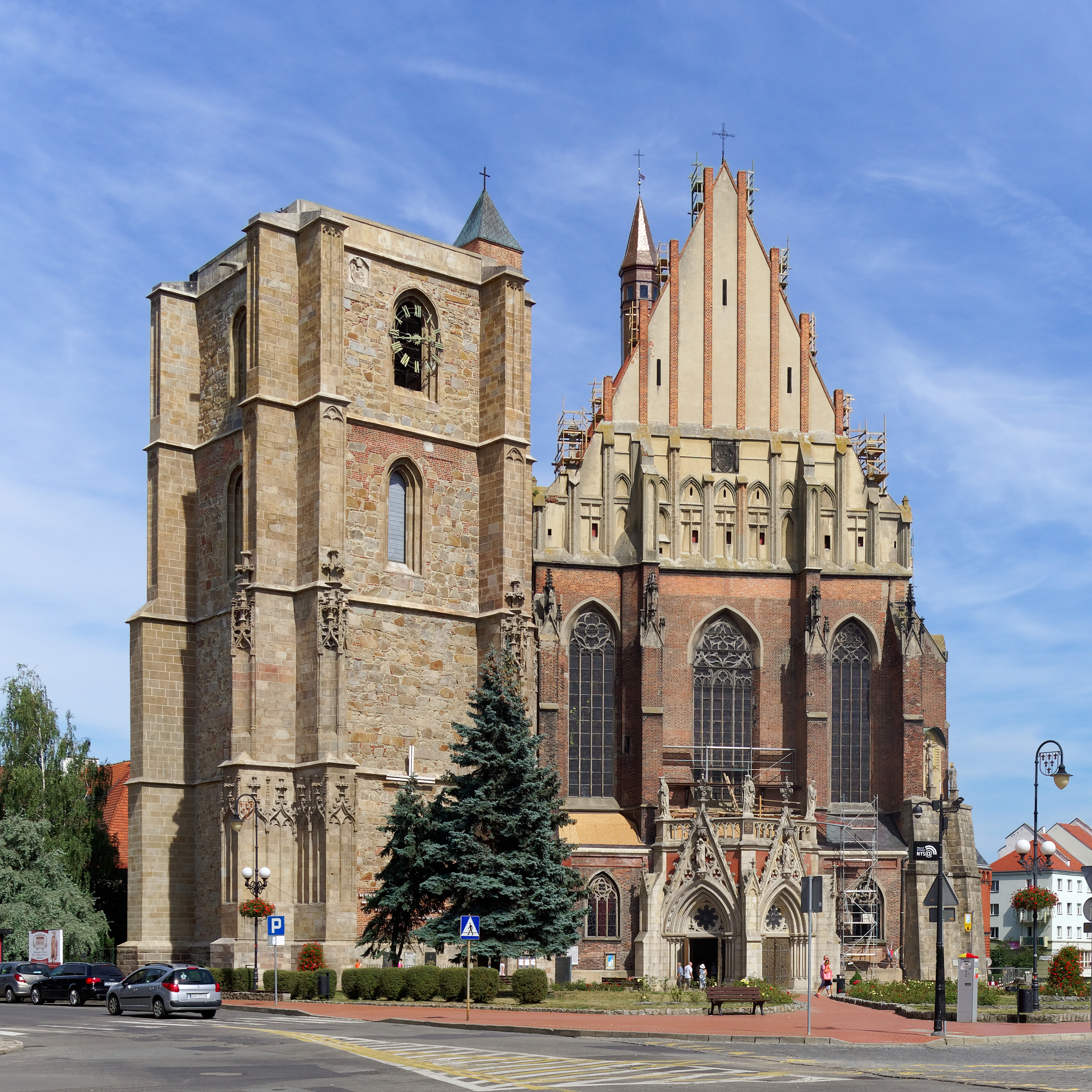
Basilica of St. James and St. Agnes, Nysa, Historic Monument of Poland

Upon his appointment as Bishop of Wrocław in 1198, Jarosław of Opole, elder son of the Silesian duke Bolesław I the Tall, received the territories around the town of Nysa from his father. After Jarosław's death in 1201, his half-brother Duke Henry I the Bearded of Silesia decided to leave Nysa, as well as the castellany of Otmuchów, under the control of the Diocese of Wrocław, while the rest of the late Jarosław's Upper Silesian lands were annexed by his uncle Mieszko IV Tanglefoot in the following year. In 1290 Henry IV Probus, duke of Lower Silesia at Wrocław, gave the bishops privileges of autonomy on their lands in Nysa, creating the legal basis for the Duchy of Nysa. Henry of Wierzbna, Bishop of Wrocław from 1302 to 1319, was the first to actually use the title of a Duke of Nysa.

The duchy in its original form only lasted until 1335, when Silesia passed to the Kingdom of Bohemia by the Treaty of Trentschin. In 1342 Bishop Przecław of Pogorzeli swore the oath of fealty to King John the Blind and afterwards played a vital role in the negotiations for the 1348 Treaty of Namslau between John's successor Charles IV and King Casimir III the Great of Poland. Pogorzeli also significantly enlarged his territory by acquisition of Grodków from Duke Bolesław III the Generous of Brzeg in 1344. For the next two hundred years, the Polish, Czech and German inhabitants of Nysa-Grodków lived in relative harmony, even during the beginnings of the Reformation as the control of the region switched between Protestant and Catholic rulers. This ended with the Thirty Years' War.

The Duchy of Nysa (yellow) within Austrian Silesia

The episcopate was abandoned by the bishops during the Silesian Wars. Following the First Silesian War, the 1742 Treaty of Breslau divided the principality, with the larger northern part (1,231 km^{2}, 475 sq mi) including the town of Nysa becoming part of the Kingdom of Prussia and a smaller southern part (900 km^{2}, 350 sq mi) remaining with the Austrian-ruled Kingdom of Bohemia. In 1810 the Prussian part was secularized, its autonomy removed and it was incorporated into the Prussian Silesia Province. The small part remaining in the Austrian Empire was likewise secularized to the crown land of Austrian Silesia in 1850 and is today part of Czech Silesia.

== See also ==
- Bishop of Wrocław
