= List of monuments in Nysa =

This is a list of monuments in the town of Nysa in Poland.

== Basilica of St. James and St. Agnes ==
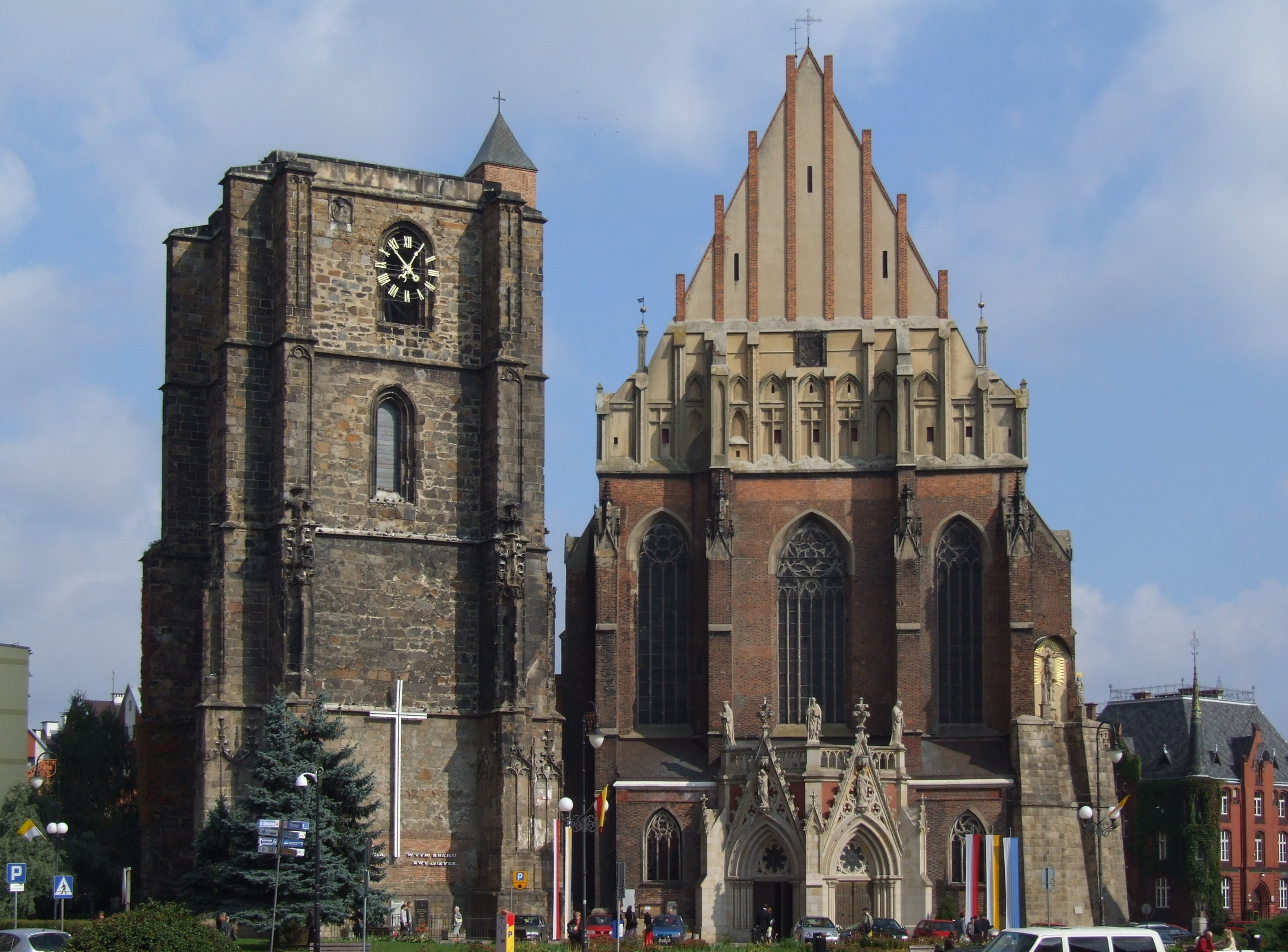
St Jacob and Agnes' church

The Basilica of St. James and St. Agnes church complex, dedicated to St. James the Apostle and St. Agnes the Virgin and Martyr, was consecrated in 1198. However, it reached its present form in 1401–30. This 71-meter-high building is surrounded by 19 chapels located between buttresses. In its gothic interior 22 pillars support the ceiling. Numerous bishops’ tombstones deserve mentioning, with the tombstone of Balthazar von Pronto being the greatest. The church burnt down in World War II, during the heavy fighting of the Vistula–Oder Offensive of early 1945 when the Red Army pushed the German Army Group A out of southwest Poland. The church was rebuilt over a 12-year period, from 1947 through to 1958. Officially a minor basilica, the church is colloquially referred to as a cathedral, even though it is a parish church.

The church is one of Poland's official national Historic Monuments (Pomnik historii), as designated February 28, 2011. Its listing is maintained by the National Heritage Board of Poland.

== Church bell tower (1474–1516) ==
It is a 43-meter-high tower, built in likeness of the bell tower in nearby (80 kilometres (50 miles)) Wrocław by three consecutive bishops – Rdesheim, Roth and Turzo. The tower was never finished (according to the plans it was supposed to be three times higher) but nevertheless it housed the 16-ton Jacob's bell. It was heavily damaged in World War II, during the heavy fighting of the Vistula–Oder Offensive of early 1945 when the Red Army pushed the German Army Group A out of southwest Poland. The tower was repaired and renovated after the war. Currently it houses a treasury displaying masterworks of Nysa's goldsmiths.

== Bishops’ Palace (1729) ==
It was a stately residence imitating one of the palaces in Rome. The seat of Wrocław bishops until 1810 it later became the location of a law court and land registry office. Presently it houses a museum.

== Town Scales House (1604) ==
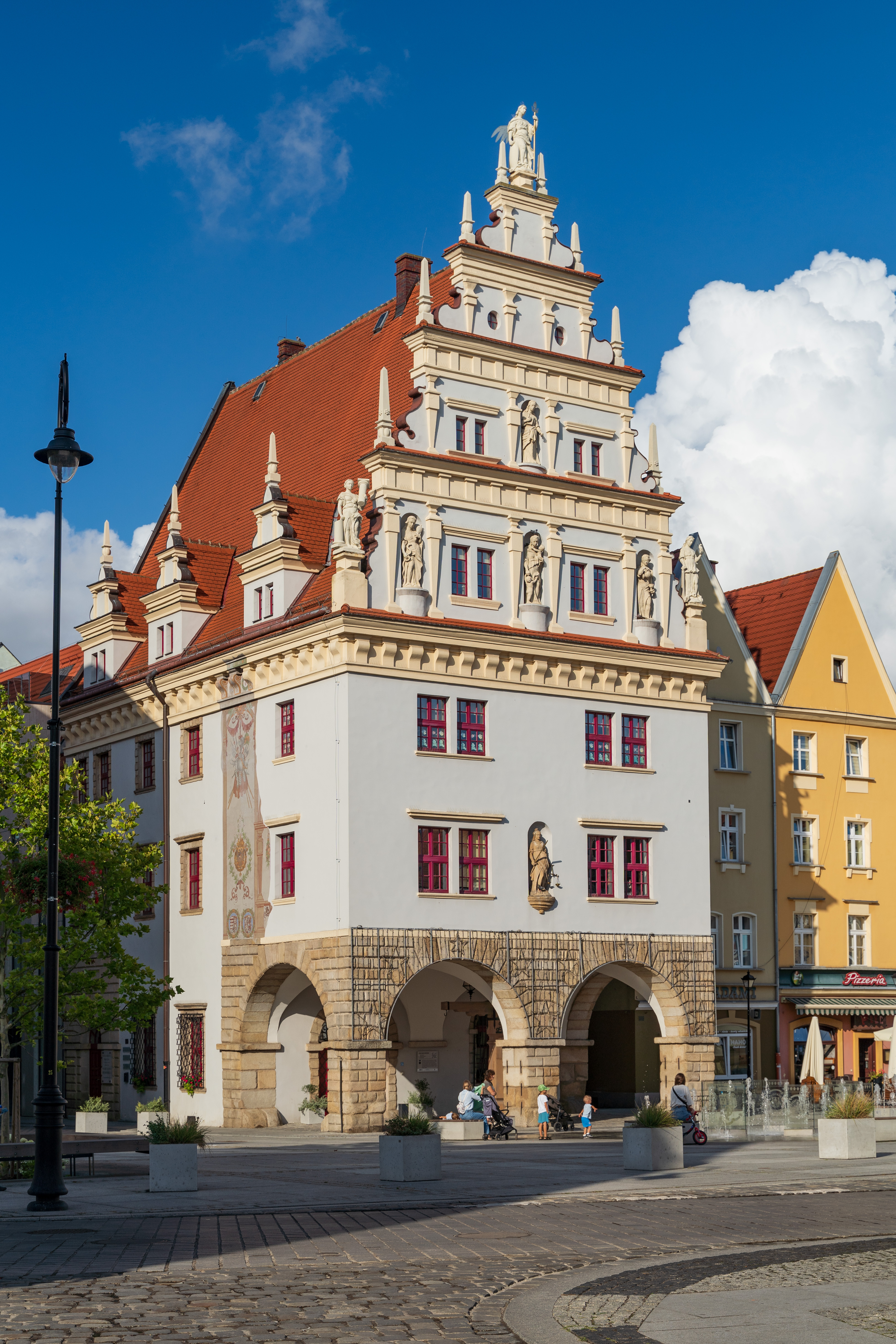
The Town Scales House

The renaissance building for weight standards used in the town. Its construction was initiated by the bishop John Stichs. The building was decorated with paintings and sculptures of which only the statue of justice and some polychromes survived up to today. On one of the corners one can find a bullet from the Napoleonic siege in 1807. It was destroyed in World War II, during the heavy fighting of the Vistula–Oder Offensive of early 1945 when the Red Army pushed the German Army Group A out of southwest Poland. The Scales House was rebuilt after the war.

== St. Peter and Paul Church (1720–1727) ==
Church belonged to the Fathers of the Holy Sepulcher. It is considered to be Nysa's most beautiful example of baroque architecture with exquisite illusion frescos by the Schefler brothers. Beautiful interior is concentrated on descriptions of Christ’s life, however, we can find there an imitation of His grave too. But the most interesting piece in the church is a cross on the ceiling, which seems to be hanging vertically regardless of an angle from which it is viewed – masterpiece of illusion painting.

== “Carolinum” (1669–1673) ==
Former representative seat of the Jesuit fraternity, the main founder of which was bishop Carl Ferdinand. After the liquidation of the order, the building was turned into a high school (remains so even presently), which became one of the most important schools of modern Silesia. Its most beautiful part is the beautiful baroque gate at the entrance to the building.

== Virgin’s Mary Assumption Church (1629) ==
The church was built by the Jesuits on the site of a medieval temple. Its interior represents the distinct Jesuit style, sometimes called “Del Gesu”. The front is fitted with niches containing wooden figures of Jesuit saints. Under the Prussians the temple was changed into a storehouse

== Town hall tower (1488–1499) ==
One of the most beautiful towers in Silesia. Originally it was 95 meters high, it was destroyed in 1945 and not rebuilt until 2009. Its present structure alludes to the historical tower and will be used as a view tower. The presently non-existing town hall was built in the 16th century; since the second half of the 18th century it was used as a Protestant garrison church, in 1885–1914 as an Old Catholic Church, and later as a display hall.

== Tower gates ==
They were parts of Nyssa's fortifications, those are two out of four towers, that survived till present days, they both serve as view points.

Tower by Wrocław Gate (1350 and 1550) is a 33-meter-high tower with beautifully decorated baroque portal.

Tower by Ziebice Gate (1770–1701) is 42 meters high. In 1922 a stone lion figurine, allegedly looted from Ziebice, was placed above the tower entrance.

== Former bishop court ==
Originally it was a castle standing since 1260, rebuilt and surrounded with court buildings in 1459. In 1842 the building was torn down and adapted for artillery workshops. The only part that remained is a residential and defensive towers along with a fragment of wall. The wall by the gate was marked according to water levels during floods that befell Nysa.
