= Rudolf Fränkel =

German-Jewish architect

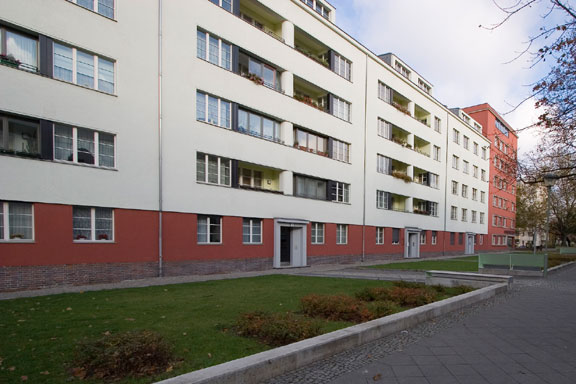
Gartenstadt Atlantic, Fränkel's first major solo commission: flats on Behmstrasse

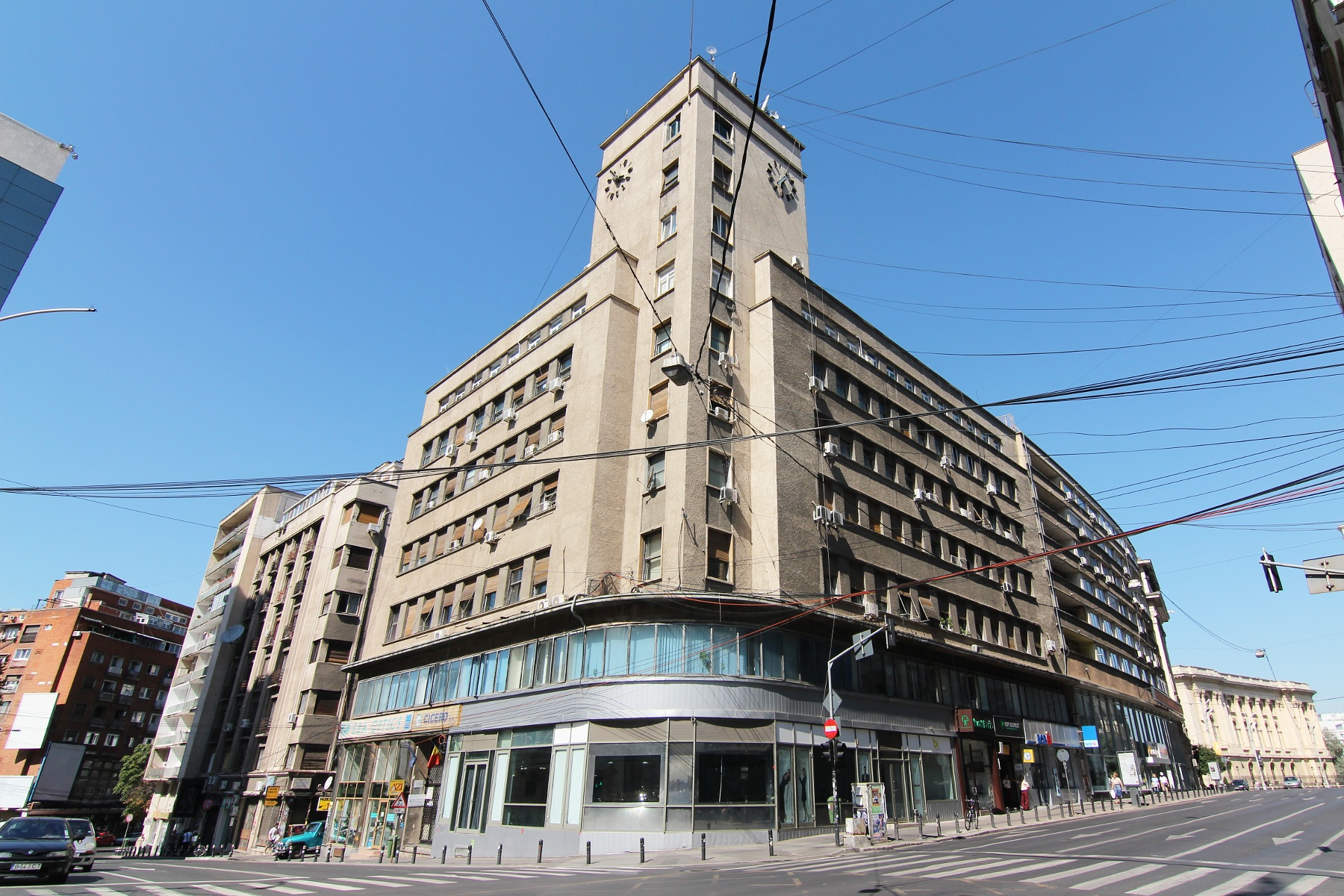
The Adriatica Building in Bucharest

Rudolf Fränkel, often anglicised as Rudolf or Rudolph Frankel (14 June 1901 in Neisse, Upper Silesia, now Nysa, Poland – 23 April 1974 in Cincinnati, Ohio) was a German-Jewish architect who was among the leaders of the pre-war avant-garde movement in Berlin. He later emigrated to Bucharest, London and the United States, where he became an Architecture professor at Miami University, Ohio.

== Life and career ==
Fränkel was the son of Louis Fränkel, a government architect who was in Silesia supervising the construction of a railway, and his wife Ida and grew up in a comfortably middle-class Jewish family in Berlin. After completing school Carolinum with a war emergency Abitur and serving as a volunteer in the Luftstreitkräfte (Imperial German Air Force), he studied at the Technische Hochschule in Berlin (now Technische Universität Berlin) and did his practical study with his father. He served his apprenticeship from 1922 to 1924 with Richard Riemerschmid in Munich and then Gustav Hart in Berlin. In 1922 he married Eva Tarrasch, the daughter of a physician.

In 1924 he opened his own office in Berlin, and in 1925 he became a member of the Deutscher Werkbund. His first large commission was the Gartenstadt Atlantic, a moderate-income housing development in Gesundbrunnen, which has been a protected landmark since 1995. The buildings were unusually brightly coloured even for modernist housing of the period: the ground floor was violet, the upper floors pale green, the entrances grey and the balcony strips yellow. This detail has not been preserved; colours were updated as part of the 2001-05 renovation. In 1927, the development won the Werkbund's first prize for best housing development for inverting the concept of the garden city into an inner-city development with internal parks, and for the holistic lifestyle made possible by the central location. The first portion of the development to be completed was the Lichtburg cinema and its associated commercial building housing restaurants, meeting and banquet facilities, shops and a bowling alley, next to the S- and U-Bahn station. The cinema was one of the first with sound; the building as a whole won praise for its modernity and for the use of space. He went on to design other residential buildings, housing developments and places of amusement in Berlin and environs, including a block of 400 flats finished in yellow stucco over a brown brick ground floor facing the Schöneberg city park.

Fränkel's designs were recognised in the architectural press as exemplars of modernist architecture and of efficient use of space. In addition, his amusement buildings, particularly the Lichtburg, were famous examples of Architecture of the Night (Architektur der Nacht) or Light Architecture (Lichtarchitektur). In the mid-1920s Walter Gropius invited him to join the Bauhaus faculty, but he declined on grounds of lack of time.

After the Nazi seizure of power, Jews and modernists suffered increasingly from discrimination; after 1933 Jewish architects were effectively banned from working, since they could not join the Reichskulturkammer. In summer 1933, Fränkel emigrated to Bucharest, where he designed another major cinema, the Scala, and further residential buildings.

Bucharest also became dangerous; in 1937 Fränkel moved to London, where his brother-in-law was already established. In England and Wales, he designed significant industrial and residential buildings that today constitute major examples of "continental modernism". In 1938 he designed a house for his sister and brother-in-law and one for himself on Stanmore Hill in Great Stanmore. While in England he became a founder member of the "Circle" Group of German and Austrian Architects and Engineers (in 1943), was a member of Architects for the Redevelopment of Distressed Areas (in 1945) and of the Royal Institute of British Architects (from 1947 to 1974: F.R.I.B.A.). However, at the outbreak of World War II in September 1939, he was interned for a short time as an "enemy alien".

Finally, in 1950, he emigrated to the United States to teach at Miami University in Oxford, Ohio. He joined the American Institute of Planners and in 1954 started the Graduate Program in City Design, probably the first urban design programme at any American university; it became a two-year programme in 1966. Between 1955 and 1964, Rudolf Frankel & Associates developed master plans for several cities, including Loveland, Ohio. He was hired to plan the repositioning of Evansville, Indiana, as a city attractive to industry in the late 1950s and early 1960s. However, he was denied tenure on the pretext of being a foreign national, and when his programme was terminated in 1968, he resigned with regret. He continued to live in Oxford until his death in 1974. In 2006 he was posthumously made professor emeritus.

Fränkel's papers are at the Canadian Centre for Architecture in Montreal. The Rudolph Frankel Memorial Award at Miami University is awarded to a graduate student who shows promise in urban design or planning.

== Selected works ==
- 1924–1928: Gartenstadt Atlantic settlement, Gesundbrunnen, Berlin
- 1926: Residential building, Emser Straße 14-17a, Wilmersdorf, Berlin
- 1926–28: Country house for film director Gabriel Levy, Silberberger Straße 29a, Bad Saarow
- 1927: Honig settlement, Bellermannstraße 72–78, Gesundbrunnen, Berlin
- 1927–1929: Lichtburg cinema at Gartenstadt Atlantic, Gesundbrunnen, Berlin
- 1927–1930: One- and two-family houses at Gartenstadt Frohnau, Frohnau, Berlin
- 1928: Bridge over the River Ruhr in Westhofen, Schwerte (destroyed)
- 1929: Two-family house, Warnemünder Straße 28a and b, Dahlem, Berlin
- 1929–32: Lange House (complex for the elderly including theatre, cinema and clinic), Bad Saarow
- 1930: Flats on Grieser Platz, Halensee, Berlin
- 1930–1931: Leuchtturm Restaurant, Friedrichstraße 138, Mitte, Berlin
- 1930–31: Four-storey residential buildings at the Schlosspark, Pankow, Berlin
- 1930–1932: Housing on the Stadtpark Schöneberg, Schöneberg, Berlin
- 1931–1932: Stern residence, Schmolz, near Breslau
- 1932–1933: Renovation, Albert Schumann Theatre, Frankfurt am Main (destroyed in 1944, ruins demolished 1960)
- 1933–1934: Pop residence, Caragiale 9, Bucharest
- 1934: Flats for childless couples, Bucharest
- 1934: Resita steel plant, Oţelu Roşu
- 1933–1935: Adriatica Asigurarea building, Bucharest
- 1934–1936: Silk-weaving factory near Bucharest (Velvet Textile Mill)
- 1935–1936: Teatrul de Comedie, Bucharest
- 1935–1937: Malaxa flats, Bucharest
- 1935–1937: Scala cinema, Bucharest
- 1936–1937: Villa Flavian, str. Serg Gheorghe Militaru (now strada Mahatma Gandhi) and Soseaua Kisseleff, Bucharest
- 1937–1938: Rachwalsky residence, Home Counties, for his sister Hanna and her husband Max, now a Grade II listed building
- 1937–1938: Frankel house, Home Counties
- 1941: E. H. Jones (Machine Tools) Ltd. factory, sales space, canteen, Kingsbury
- 1946–1947: Suflex Ltd. factory
- 1946–1948: Sotex Ltd. nylon clothing factory, Congleton
- 1949: Lichfield residence, Stanmore
- 1950: Luralda Ltd. warehouse, London
- 1950: Extension, Rachwalsky residence, New York

== Sources ==
- Julius Rosenthal. The Work of Rudolf Frankel: A Monograph on Slides. Chicago, 1955
- Christina Thomson. "Hauptstadtarchitekten: Erwin Gutkind und Rudolf Fränkel". In: Sylvia Claus, Harold Hammer-Schenk and Ulrich Maximilian Schumann (eds.). Architektur und Assimilation. Die jüdischen Baumeister Berlins. Zurich, 2007.
- Gerardo Brown-Manrique. Rudolf Fränkel and Neues Bauen: Works in Germany, Romania and the United Kingdom. Tübingen: Wasmuth, 2009. ISBN 978-3-8030-0695-0
