= Hans-Joachim Caesar =

German lawyer and banking official

- Born: May 17, 1905; Neisse, Silesia, Prussia, German Empire
- Died: May 18, 1990 (aged 85); Cologne, West Germany
- Occupation: Director of Reichsbank
- Known for: German Bank Comptroller in Occupied France, 1940-1944

Hans-Joachim Caesar (17 May 1905 – 18 May 1990) was a German lawyer and banking official, working for the German Reichsbank from 1931 until the end of World War II. He was director of Germany's Reichsbank during World War II and basically served as "second-in-line" to Vice President Emil Puhl. From 1940 to 1944, Caesar served as German Banking Administrator/Comptroller ("Bankenkommissar") for France in Paris.

== Life ==
Born in Neisse, Silesia, Prussia, Germany, Caesar studied law in Marburg, Münster and Kiel, and started to work for Reichsbank in Berlin in December, 1931, shortly before the end of the Weimar Republic. On January 1, 1935, he was appointed "Reichsbankrat" (Reichsbank Councillor), a few years later he became a member of the directorate. As a Reichsbank Director he was, for example, responsible for the administration of U.S. assets and accounts within the territory and zone of control of the Reich. In that role, some authors see Caesar as second-in-line to "de facto" head of the Reichsbank and official Vice President Emil Puhl, who managed business operations of Reichsbank on behalf of the nominal head, the President of Reichsbank and Minister of Economy of the Reich Walther Funk.

From 1940 until 1944, Caesar was German Bank Comptroller/Administrator in France, located in Paris. In that role, Caesar supervised the Paris branches of Allied banks such as Barclays and Chase Manhattan Bank. Caesar was also responsible for "enemy banks" in German-occupied British territory on the Channel Islands, and visited Jersey in January, 1941. Caesar's role is controversial. Some authors stress his participation in the theft and exploitation of Jewish property, as a close aide of Puhl and Funk. Others point out that he reportedly refused offers of over-eager French bank officials to blackmail Jewish colleagues or assist with the confiscation of Jewish property. However, unlike Funk, who was sentenced to life at the First Nuremberg Trial in 1946, and Puhl, who was sentenced to five years jail at the so-called "Wilhelmstrasse"-Trial, there were apparently no legal proceedings against Caesar.

After 1945, Caesar lived in Cologne (West Germany) and was board member of several German banks, as well as representative of foreign, for example Swiss, banks in Germany. He died in Cologne on May 18, 1990.
