= Immanuel Oscar Menahem Deutsch =

German Jewish scholar of Semitic studies

Emanuel Oscar Menahem Deutsch
- Born: 1829; Neisse, Prussian Silesia
- Died: May 12, 1873 (aged 43–44); Alexandria, Ottoman Egypt
- Other names: Immanuel Oscar Menahem Deutsch
- Occupation: Jewish scholar

Emanuel Oscar Menahem Deutsch (1829 – 12 May 1873) was a German Jewish scholar of Semitic studies, the Talmud and Middle Eastern studies.

== Biography ==
Deutsch was born in Neisse, Prussian Silesia (now Nysa, Poland). His education was begun by an uncle, to whose inspiration he owed his interest in Oriental languages and literature. On reaching his sixteenth year, he began his studies at the University of Berlin, paying special attention to theology and the Talmud. He also mastered the English language and studied English literature.

In 1855 Deutsch was appointed assistant in the library of the British Museum. He worked intensely on the Talmud and contributed no less than 190 papers to Chambers' Encyclopaedia, as well as essays on the Targum and the Samaritan Pentateuch for Smith's Dictionary of the Bible, essays for John Kitto's Biblical dictionary, and articles in periodicals. The monument of his official work in the British Museum is to be found in the Phoenician Inscriptions, edited by William Sandys Wright Vaux, to whom Deutsch rendered assistance.

In October 1867 his article on The Talmud, published in the Quarterly Review, made him known, creating a great interest in the Talmud in Britain, including admirers such as George Eliot. The article was translated into French, German, Russian, Swedish, Dutch and Danish, and reprinted by the American Jewish Publication Society, Special Series No. 3 (Philadelphia, 1897). Deutsch was an important influence on George Eliot's Jewish characters and their ideas in her last novel Daniel Deronda.

From 1869 to 1870, Deutsch was a special correspondent for The Times during the Ecumenical Council at the Vatican and wrote letters on its deliberations.

He died at Alexandria on 12 May 1873. A collection, Literary Remains, edited by Lady Strangford, was published in 1874, consisting of nineteen papers on such subjects as "The Talmud," "Islam," "Semitic Culture," "Egypt," "Ancient and Modern," "Semitic Languages," "The Targums," "The Samaritan Pentateuch," and "Arabic Poetry."
