= Konrad Emil Bloch =

German-American biochemist (1912–2000)

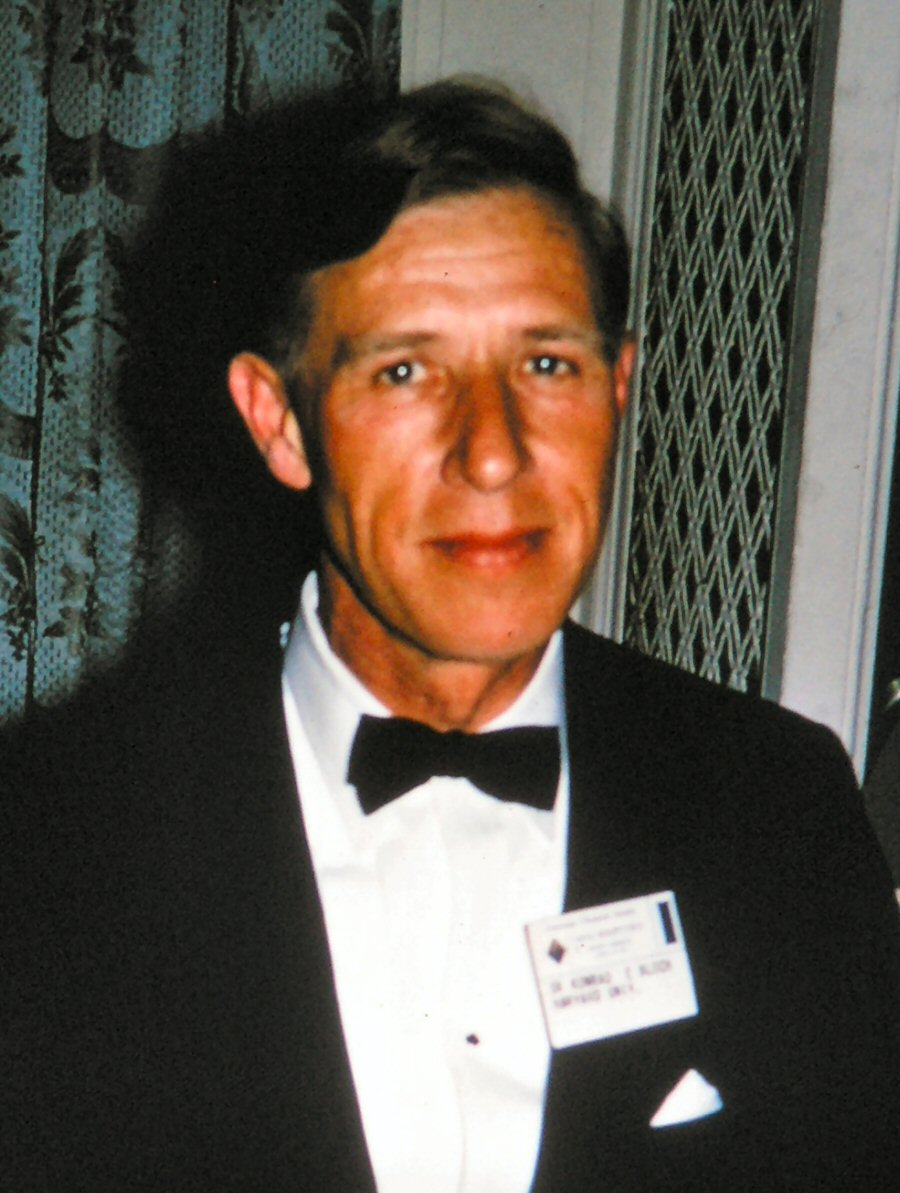
- Bloch in 1964
- Born: 21 January 1912; Neisse, Prussia, German Empire
- Died: 15 October 2000 (aged 88); Burlington, Massachusetts, United States
- Citizenship: Germany; United States
- Awards: Nobel Prize in Physiology or Medicine (1964); Ernest Guenther Award (1965)
- Scientific career
- Workplaces: University of Chicago

Konrad Emil Bloch (German pronunciation: [ˈkɔnʁaːt ˈblɔx]; 21 January 1912 – 15 October 2000) was a German-American biochemist. Bloch received the Nobel Prize in Physiology or Medicine in 1964 (joint with Feodor Lynen) for discoveries concerning the mechanism and regulation of the cholesterol and fatty acid metabolism.

== Life and career ==
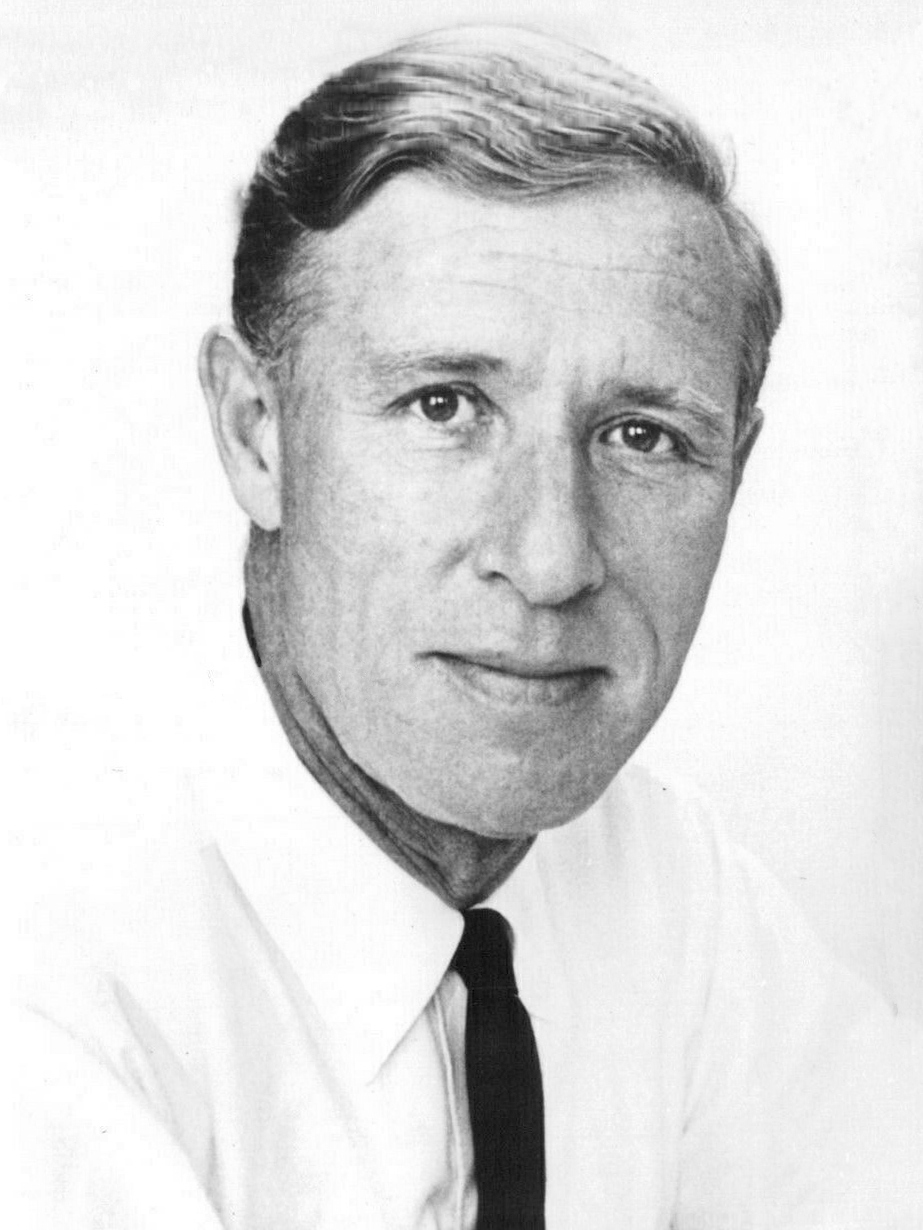
Bloch c. 1963

Bloch was born in Neisse (now Nysa, Poland), in the German Empire's Prussian Province of Silesia into a Jewish family. He was the second child of middle-class parents Hedwig (Striemer) and Frederich D. "Fritz" Bloch. He was a student at the Gymnasium Carolinum in Nysa and then 1930 to 1934, he studied chemistry at the Technical University of Munich. In 1934, due to the Nazi persecutions of Jews, he fled to the Schweizerische Forschungsinstitut in Davos, Switzerland, before moving to the United States in 1936. Later he was appointed to the department of biological chemistry at Yale Medical School.

In the United States, Bloch enrolled at Columbia University, and received a PhD in biochemistry in 1938. He taught at Columbia from 1939 to 1946. From there he went to the University of Chicago and then to Harvard University as Higgins Professor of Biochemistry in 1954, a post he held until 1982. From 1979 until 1984, he was a professor of science at their School of Public Health. After retirement at Harvard, he served as the Mack and Effie Campbell Tyner Eminent Scholar Chair in the College of Human Sciences at Florida State University.

Bloch shared the Nobel Prize in Physiology or Medicine in 1964 with his compatriat Feodor Lynen, for their discoveries concerning the mechanism and regulation of the cholesterol and fatty acid metabolism. Their work showed that the body first makes squalene from acetate over many steps and then converts the squalene to cholesterol. He traced all the carbon atoms in cholesterol back to acetate. Some of his research was conducted using radioactive acetate in bread mold: this was possible because fungi also produce squalene. He confirmed his results using rats. He was one of several researchers who showed that acetyl Coenzyme A is turned into mevalonic acid. Both Bloch and Lynen then showed that mevalonic acid is converted into chemically active isoprene, the precursor to squalene. Bloch also discovered that bile and a female sex hormone were made from cholesterol, which led to the discovery that all steroids were made from cholesterol. His Nobel Lecture was "The Biological Synthesis of Cholesterol."

In 1985, Bloch became a Fellow of the Royal Society. In 1988, he was awarded the National Medal of Science. He was an elected member of the American Academy of Arts and Sciences, the United States National Academy of Sciences, and the American Philosophical Society.

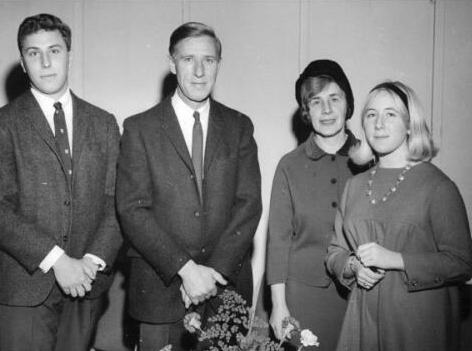
Bloch with wife and children in Stockholm in 1964

Bloch and his wife Lore Teutsch first met in Munich. They married in the U.S. in 1941. They had two children, Peter Conrad Bloch and Susan Elizabeth Bloch, and two grandchildren, Benjamin Nieman Bloch and Emilie Bloch Sondel. They lived for many decades in the mid-century modern enclave Six Moon Hill in Lexington, Massachusetts. He was fond of skiing, tennis, and music. Konrad died in Burlington, Massachusetts of congestive heart failure in 2000, aged 88. Lore Bloch died in 2010 aged 98.

== See also ==
- Biology Today, college-level biology textbook, contribution by Bloch
- List of Jewish Nobel laureates
