= Flag of Nysa =

Polish Town Flag

Nysa
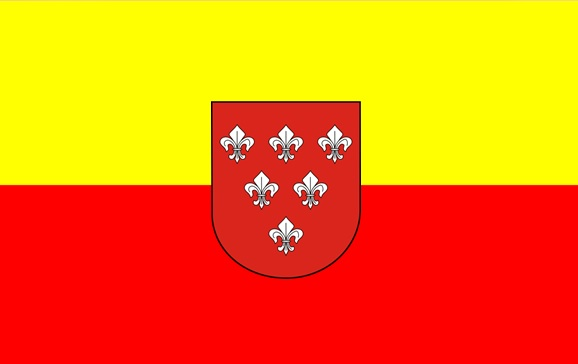
- Flag of Nysa
- Proportion: 5:8
- Adopted: August 23, 1990
- Design: A yellow and red background; with the coat of arms of Nysa in the centre

The flag of Nysa is a town flag of the town of Nysa, Opole Voivodeship, in Poland. The flag of Nysa is a bi-colour of yellow and red; where in the centre the flag has the town's coat of arms, featuring six white fleur-de-lis lilies. The fleur-de-lis are arranged in three rows: three on the top row; two in the middle; and one fleur-de-lis lily on the bottom row – all in a white colour.

== Coat of arms ==
The former coat of arms of Nysa originates from a seal from 1260, presenting a tower with a gate, with a crosier inside – a symbol of the Bishops of Wrocław; the symbol is no longer found on a seal from 1290. In 1306, the seal presented John the Baptist; a patron of Wrocław Cathedral Church, and the whole Archdiocese of Wrocław. The Saint, holding the Lamb of God, behind a perpendicular, Gothic building (possibly the Nysa Basilica); where by his feet, is the figure of a bishop, with a mitre and a crosier.
