= Marcin Bors =

Polish musical artist (born 1978)

- Born: 30 May 1978 (age 47)
- Origin: Nysa, Poland
- Genres: Rock, heavy metal, pop, hip hop
- Occupation(s): Record producer, sound engineer
- Instrument(s): Keyboards, guitar, bass guitar, drums, percussion

Marcin Bors (born 30 May 1978) is a Polish record producer, sound engineer and multi-instrumentalist.

He started working as a sound engineer in the late 1990s, mostly with heavy metal bands such as Artrosis, Lost Soul and Moonlight among others. In the late 2000s, Bors became a prominent producer for the Polish alternative rock music scene. Over the years, he worked for such groups as Hey, Pogodno, Muchy, Myslovitz and Hurt among others. Although recognized as a rock producer, he also worked with hip-hop and reggae artists Donguralesko, Mesajah, Jamal and Mrozu.

In 2010, Marcin Bors, with Paweł Krawczyk, received the Fryderyk–an annual award in the Polish music industry–in the Best Production category (Produkcja muzyczna roku). Between 2008 and 2013, Bors received seven other nominations for that award.

In 2014, he became a judge in the TVP2 television series SuperSTARcie, based on the Norwegian singing competition The Ultimate Entertainer, which is itself based on the Vietnamese competition Tuyệt đỉnh tranh tài.

Bors owns and runs Fonoplastykon Studio in Wrocław, Poland.

== Discography ==
Album	Year	Notes		
Artrosis - Pośród kwiatów i cieni	1999	mastering		
Magda Femme - Empiryzm	2000	guitar		
Aion - Reconciliation	2000	producing, sound engineering, mixing		
Lost Soul - Scream of the Mourning Star	2000	sound engineering		
Moonlight - Floe	2000	producing		
Moonlight - Yaishi	2001	guitar, sound engineering, mixing		
Lebenssteuer - Dead Smile	2001	sound engineering, mixing, mastering		
Esqarial - Inheritance	2002	sound engineering		
Ocean - 12	2002	producing		
Moonlight - Candra	2002	guitar		
Zalef - Pistolet	2004	guitar		
Moonlight - Audio 136	2004	guitar, keyboards, percussion		
Hurt - Czat	2004	recording		
Ocean - Depresyjne piosenki o niczym	2004	producing, guitar, keyboards		
Moonlight - downWords	2005	recording, guitar, drums, programming, keyboards		
Plateau - Megalomania	2005	producing		
Ctrl-Alt-Del - Ctrl-Alt-Del	2005	producing, recording, mixing, guitar, programming		
Ocean - Niecierpliwy Dostaje Mniej	2006	producing, guitar, keyboards		
DonGURALesko - Drewnianej małpy rock	2006	mastering		
Moonlight - Integrated in the System of Guilt	2006	producing, keyboards, guitar, programming		
Pogodno - Opherafolia	2007	producing, mixing, mastering		
Katarzyna Groniec - Przypadki	2007	recording, mixing, mastering, guitar		
Nosowska - UniSexBlues	2007	recording, editing, mixing		
Nosowska - Osiecka	2008	producing, recording, mastering, keyboards		
Iza Lach - Już Czas	2008	producing, recording, mixing, mastering, keyboards		
Hurt - Wakacje i prezenty	2009	producing		
Mrozu - Miliony monet	2009	mixing, mastering, guitar		
Gaba Kulka - Hat, Rabbit	2009	producing, mixing, mastering		
Katarzyna Groniec - Listy Julli	2009	producing, recording, mixing, mastering, keyboards		
Hey - Miłość! Uwaga! Ratunku! Pomocy!	2009	producing, recording, mixing, mastering		
Hetane - Machines	2009	producing		
Lao Che - Prąd stały / Prąd zmienny	2010	producing, recording, mixing, keyboards		
Muchy - Notoryczni debiutanci	2010	producing, recording, mixing, mastering, keyboards		
NO! NO! NO! - NO! NO! NO!	2010	mastering		
Natu - Gram duszy	2010	mastering		
Levity - Chopin Shuffle	2010	producing		
Pogodno - Wasza Wspaniałość	2010	producing, recording, mixing, mastering		
Magnus - Acceptance of Death	2010	mixing, mastering		
Monika Brodka - Granda	2010	recording		
The Lollipops - Hold!	2011	producing		
Armia - Podróż na Wschód	2012	producing, mixing		
The Saintbox - The Saintbox	2012	producing, mixing		
Hurt - Hurt	2013	bass guitar, mixing	Pogodno - sokiści chcą miłości	recording, editing, mixing
