= Joseph Barndt =

American anti-racism activist

Joseph Barndt is an American Lutheran pastor and anti-racism activist. He is the co-founder of the Chicago-based racial justice advocacy group Crossroads Antiracism Organizing & Training (formerly Crossroads Ministry), and formerly served as its executive director. The ministry offers anti-racist training sessions to religious and community groups. He has been a pastor at Lutheran churches in Chicago, New York City, and Arizona. He is known for advocating for white people to dismantle the institutions that perpetuate racial inequality in America, rather than directly helping minorities. In 2008, Matt Miller of the Chicago Reporter wrote that Barndt "has put forth what some consider some of the most revolutionary anti-racism work of the day."

== Books ==
- Becoming an Anti-Racist Church: Journeying toward Wholeness (Augsburg Fortress, 2011)
- Liberating the White Ghetto (Augsburg Fortress, 1972)
- Beyond Brokenness (Friendship Press, 1980) (with Louis A. Smith)
- Dismantling Racism: The Continuing Challenge to White America (Augsburg Fortress, 1991)
- Deconstructing Racism: A Path toward Lasting Change (Fortress Press, 2023) (with Barbara Crain Major)
