= Carolinum, Nysa =

Carolinum
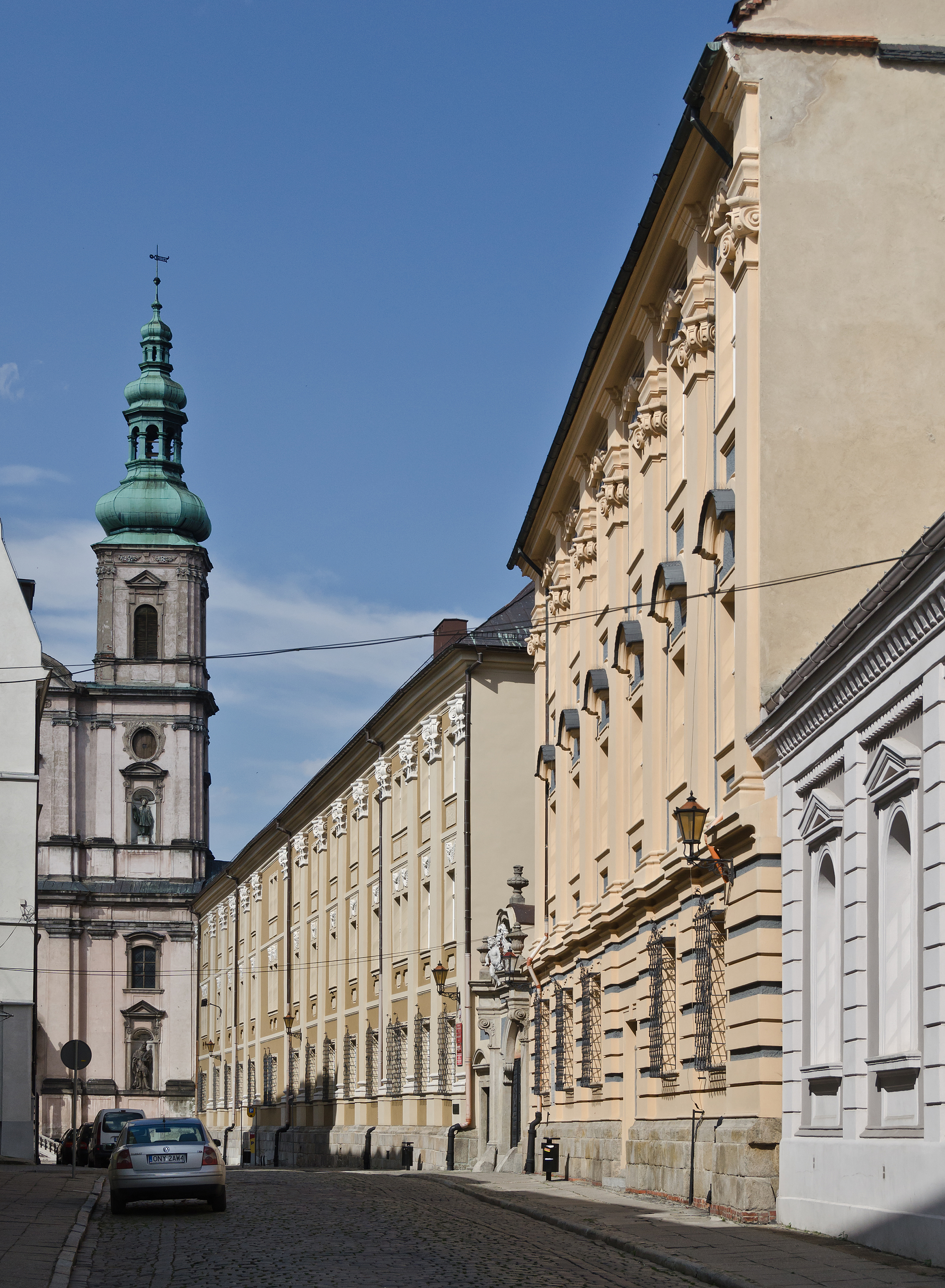
- The school as photographed in 2014

Location
- Nysa, Silesia; Poland
- Coordinates: 50.472°N 17.337°E

Information
- Other name: Allgemeinbildende Lyzeum John III Sobieski
- Religious affiliation: Secular (formerly Jesuit)
- Patron saint: St. Anne
- Established: 1624
- Founder: Charles of Austria, Bishop of Wroclaw

The Gymnasium Carolinum is a gymnasium school situated on Salt Market Square in Nysa, Poland. Founded as a Jesuit school in 1624 by Charles of Austria, Bishop of Wroclaw, it was considered to be one of the most prominent schools in the Silesia region until its secularisation in 1810, with its education standards causing Nysa to become known as the 'Silesian Rome' and 'Silesian Athens'.

Notable for its baroque buildings built in the 17th and 18th centuries and their intricate ornaments, the school site is a listed building of the Opole Voivodeship. Between 1924 and 1945 it was called the Gymnasium Carolinum after its founder; since then, it has been officially named the Allgemeinbildende Lyzeum John III Sobieski.

== History ==
In 1622, Charles of Austria, Bishop of Wroclaw founded the Jesuit college in Nysa, which opened on 23 April 1624. Due to his death the same year, his intention for the college to become a University and convent never materialised. Because the mayor's widow Anna had left her fortunes to the college, St Anne was chosen as its patron saint. The first rector of the college was the mathematician and astronomer Christoph Scheiner. Between 1626 and 1627, the Jesuit Martin Stredonius worked there as a teacher.

The Jesuit school of St Anne was designed around the Ratio Studiorum of the Jesuits and consisted of five different classes. During the Thirty Years' War the seminar building burnt down, including the school library, which resulted in the destruction of over 12,000 books and other historical documents. In 1656–1657 a new school building was constructed as a replacement. The college had a very high reputation during the term of Karol Ferdynand Vasa.

Between 1669 and 1681, the college was rebuilt to a design by Peter Schuller of Olmütz. A jesuit grammar school was built next to the college between 1722–1725 during the term of Francis Louis of Palatinate-Neuburg. The building was constructed by the Baumeister Michael Kleiner to a design by the Jesuit Christoph Tausch. The two buildings were connected in 1725 by a gateway. After Nysa, together with the whole of Silesia, was lost to Prussia in the First Silesian War, the college largely lost its significance. In 1773, Pope Clement XIV's Suppression of the Society of Jesus led Frederick the Great to authorise the Jesuit clergy to run the school until the year 1800 as the Royal School Institute.

After the secularisation of the principality of Nysa in 1810, the Jesuits were forced to leave the college. This led to the modernisation of the buildings and its renaming as the Königlichen Katholischen Gymnasium (English: King's Catholic Grammar School). It was renamed to Carolinium in 1924 in honour of its founder. After the transfer of Silesia to Poland in 1945, it was renamed once again as the Allgemeinbildende Lyzeum John III Sobieski (English: Comprehensive School of John III Sobieski), its official name today. In October 1958, the school was made a listed building (Baudenkmäler) of the Opole province.

== Famous students ==
Notable students of the school include:

- Michał Korybut Wiśniowiecki (1640–1673), later King of Poland.
- James Louis Sobieski (1667–1737), son of the Polish King John III Sobieski.
- C.L. Gloger (1803–1863), German zoologist and ornithologist.
- Eduard von Grützner (1846–1925), German genre painter.
- Karl Augustin (1847–1919), auxiliary bishop of Breslau.
- Hans Rösener (1856–1935), German architect and Prussian Baubeamter.
- Rudolf Nissen (1896–1981), German surgeon.
- Konrad Bloch (1912–2000), biochemist and Nobel Prize winner.
- Heinz Lechmann (1920–2007), German lawyer and politician.
- Alfons Nossol (b. 1932), Roman Catholic theologian and Bishop of Opole, Poland.

== Architecture ==
The current buildings consist of two baroque buildings; the Jesuit college (built 1669–1681) on the left and the Jesuit school (built 1722–1725) on the right. The two are connected via a gate built in 1725. The three-story Jesuit college is an E-shaped design, which is 89m in length compared to the 27m Jesuit school. The intricately-decorated gateway connects the buildings, which are 8m apart from one another. The building's facade is designed as a Corinthian pilaster, and both floors are supported with Ionic pilasters. On the second floor, Angel sculptures are situated above the windows. The ground floor of the school is made with bossage.

Two rooms at the college are especially well-decorated: the hall and the library. The hall used to be used by monks as a refectory. Included in the architecture of the hall are:

- two overdoors with putti und flower vases
- framed cartouches with drapery
- Niches with rocailles and Medaillons;
- Frescoes from the 17th century by Karl Dankwart, depicting biblical scenes, with stucco work by the Italian master Francesco Cigno
- Depictions of Francis Xavier as a missionary in India
- Portraits of Pope Clement XI, the Holy Roman Emperor Joseph I, the Bishop Karol Ferdynand Vasa and Frederick the Great.
- Paintings of Saints Paul, John, James, Aloysius Gonzaga, Francis Borja and Stanislaus Kostka

== Gallery ==
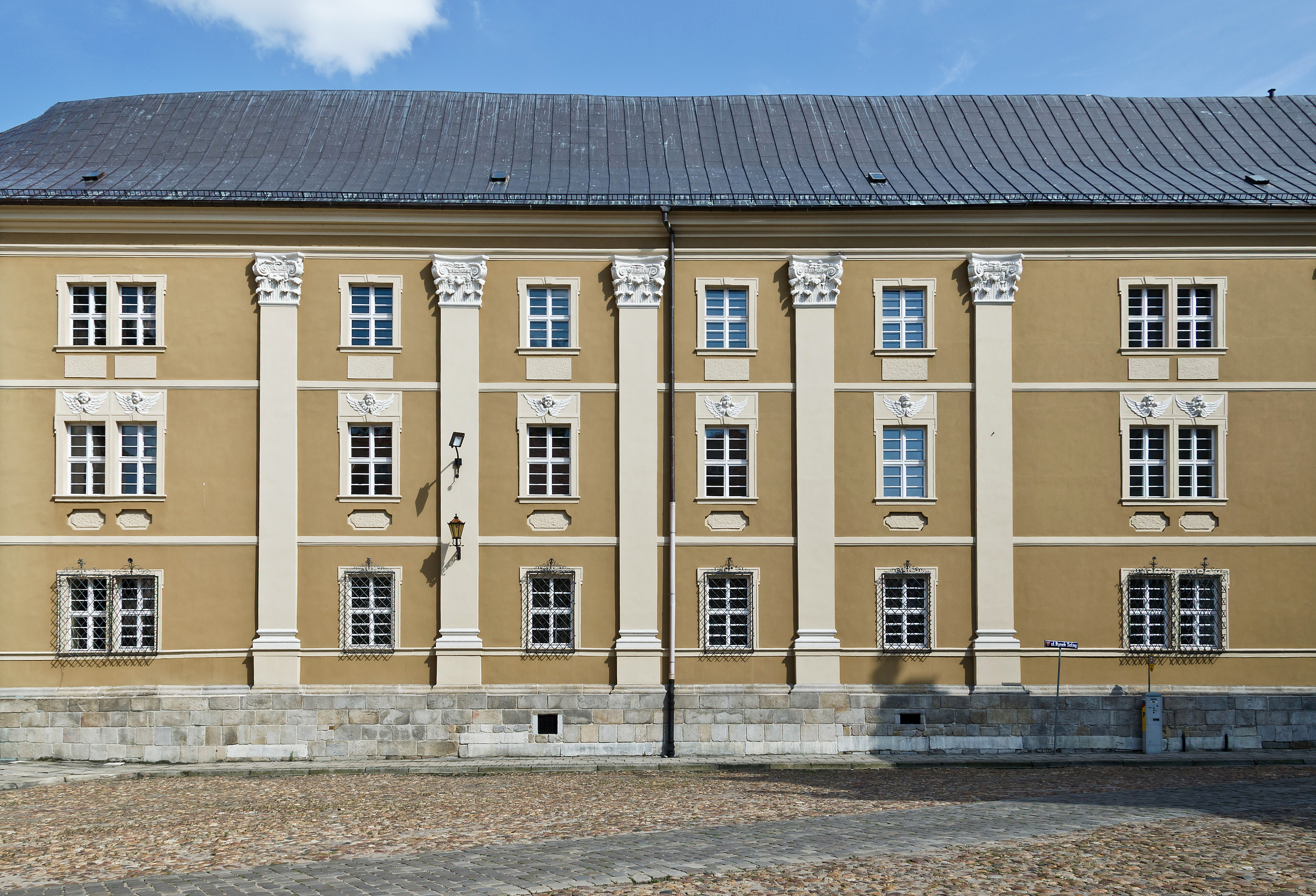
Jesuit college

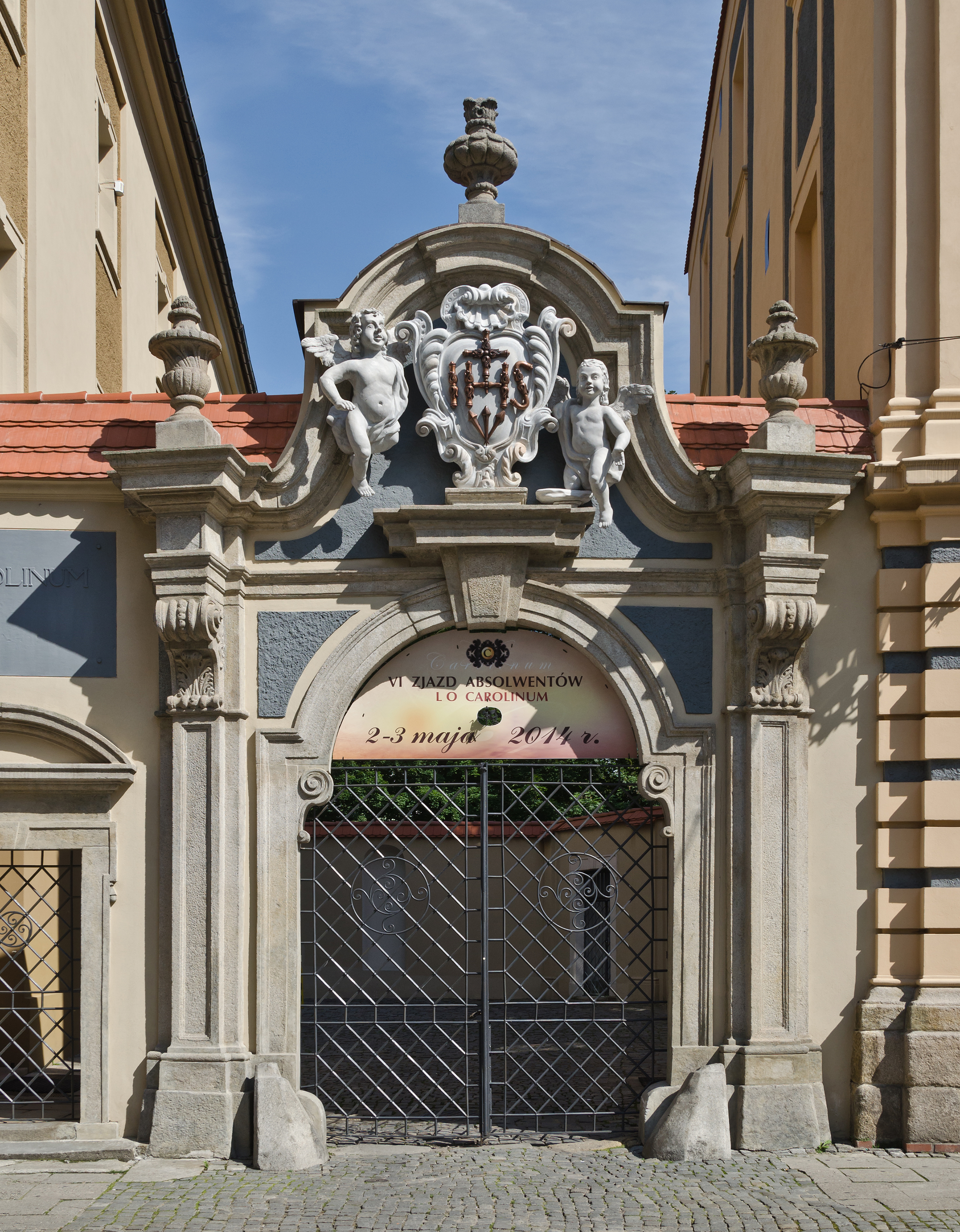
Entrance

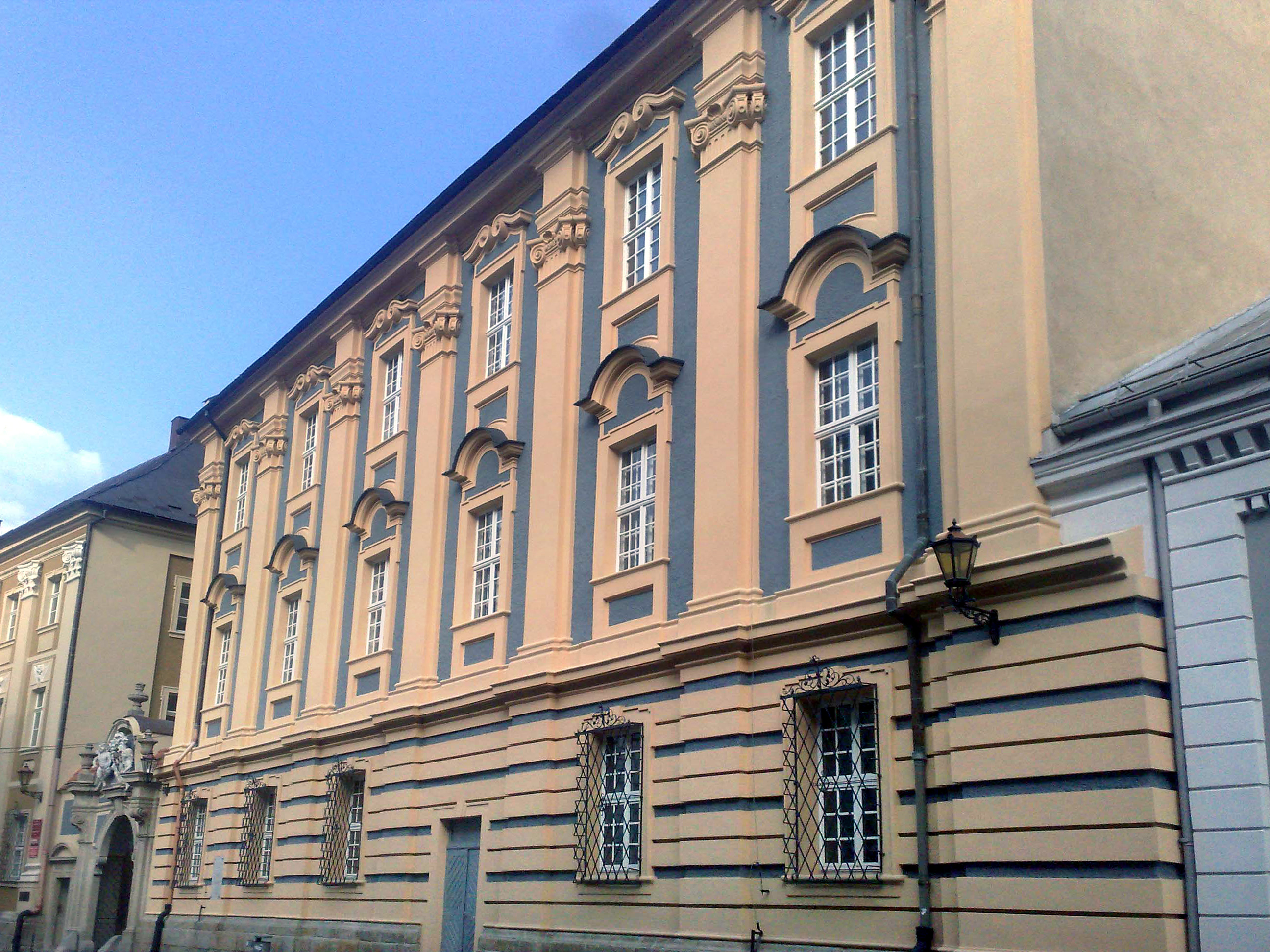
Jesuit school

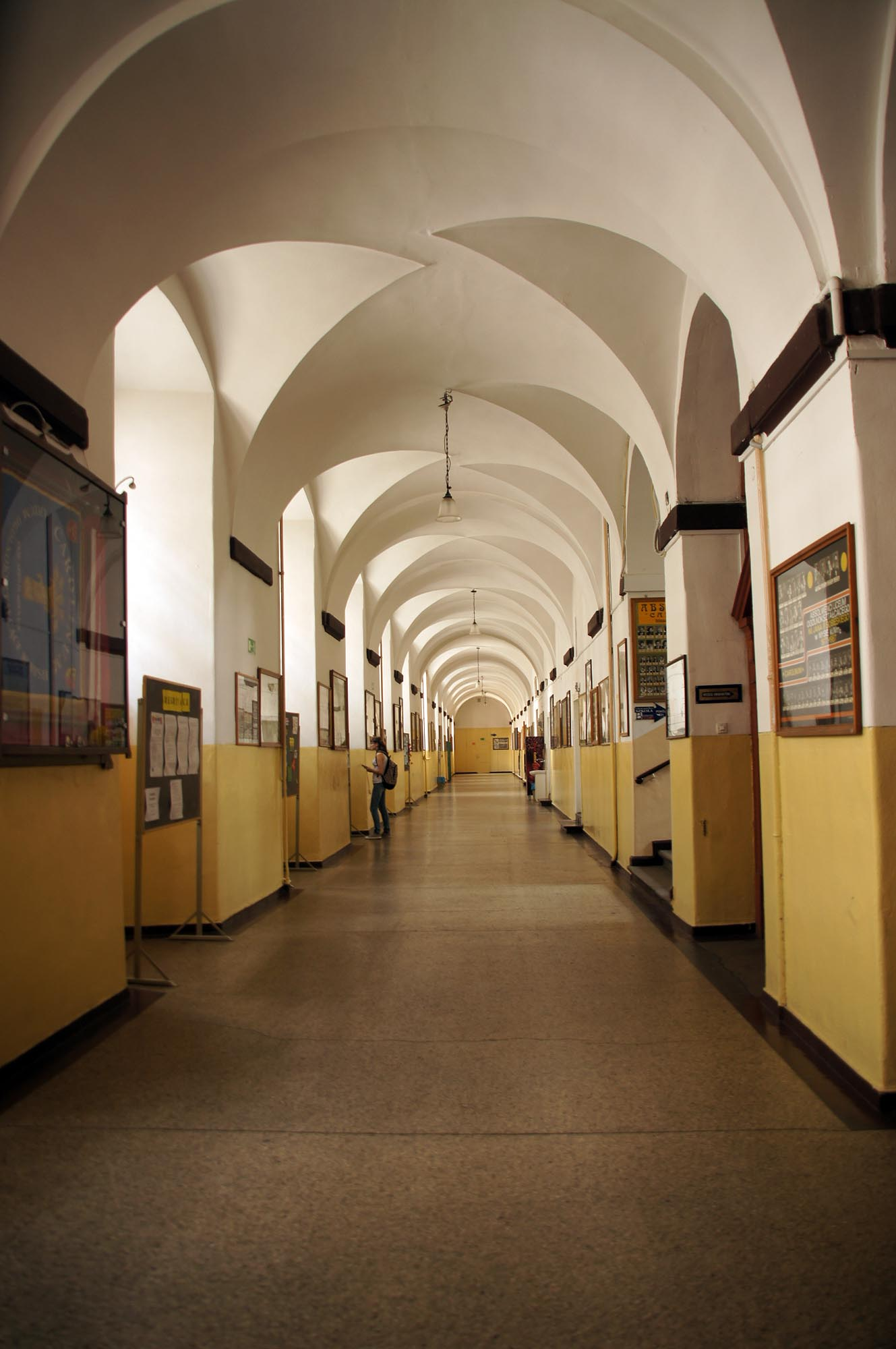
Corridor

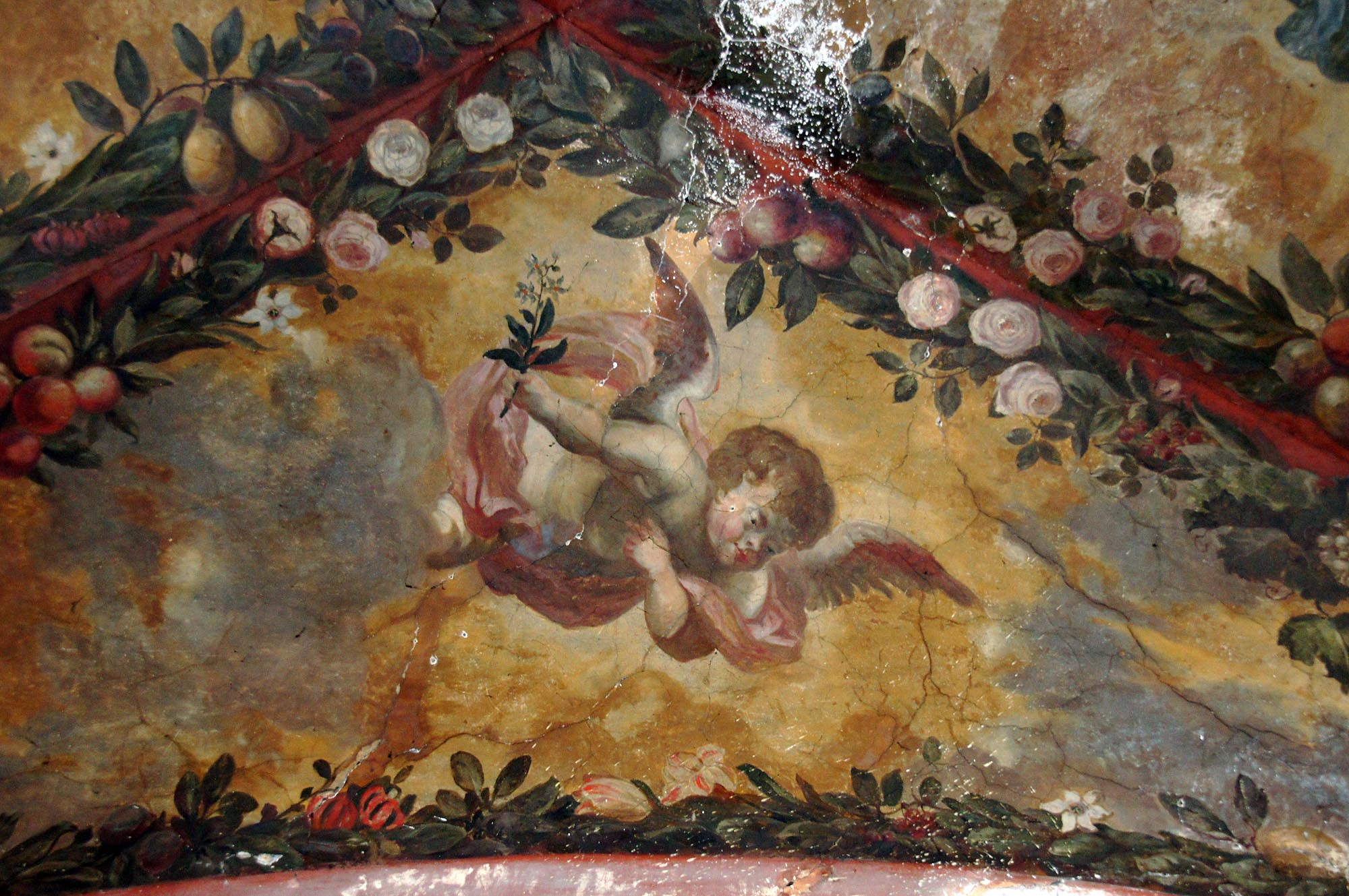
Ceiling painting
