= Isidor Barndt =

German poet (1816–1891)

Archpriest Isidor Barndt (1816–1891), a poet and world traveler from Neisse, Germany, a town in the former state of Silesia, now Nysa, Poland, promoted reunionism and wrote about similarities in faiths in order to overcome splits between Protestants and Catholics in late 19th-century Germany.
