= Basilica of St. James and St. Agnes, Nysa =

Basilica of St. James and St. Agnes
- Bazylika pw. św. Jakuba Apostoła i św. Agnieszki, Dziewicy i Męczennicy
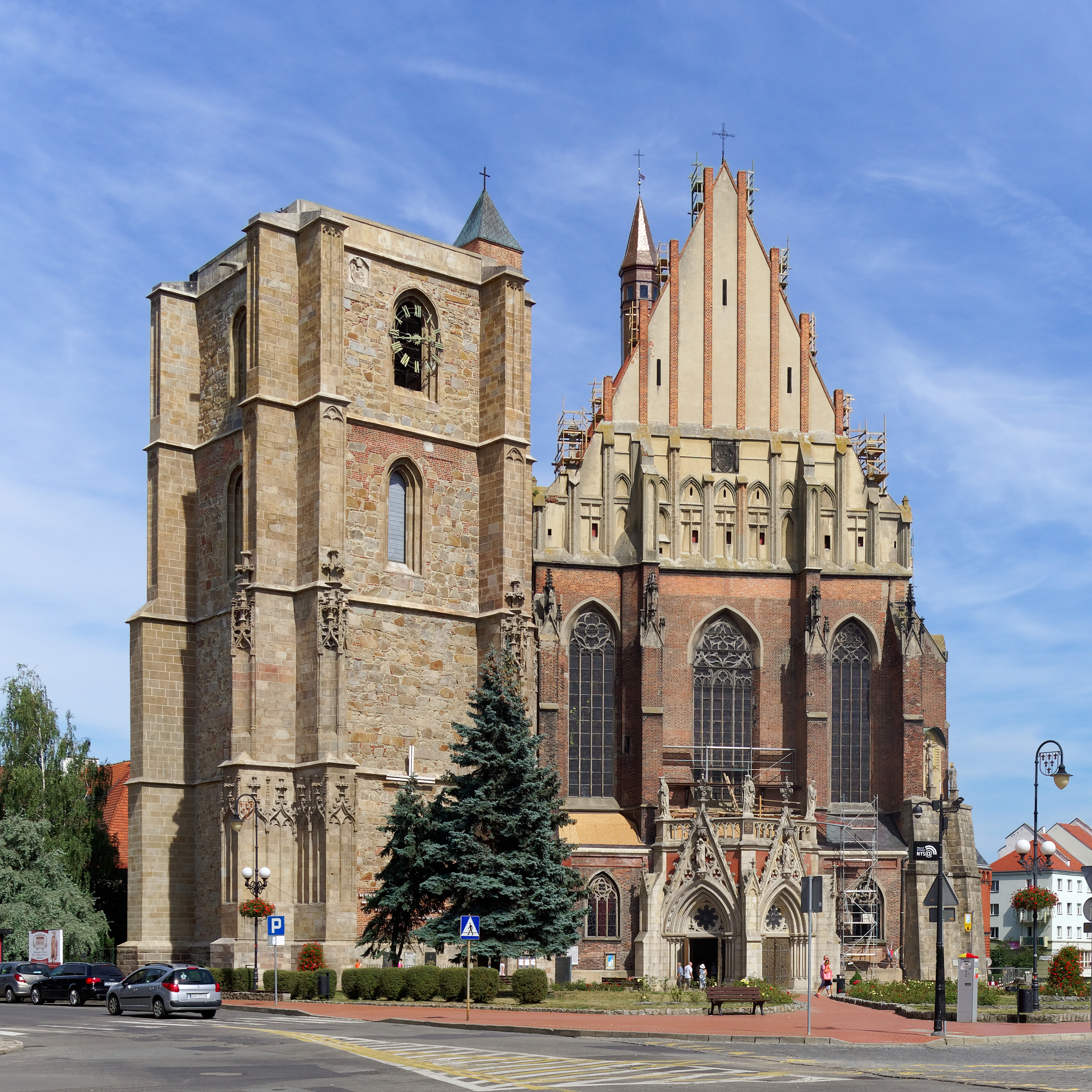
- The Church and belfry

- 50.4747°N 17.3344°E
- Location: Nysa
- Country: Poland
- Language: Polish
- Denomination: Roman Catholic

History
- Status: Parish church, Basilica minor
- Founder: Jarosław of Opole
- Dedication: James the Great and Agnes of Rome
- Consecrated: 1198

Architecture
- Functional status: Functional
- Heritage designation: Historic Monument of Poland
- Designated: 28 February 2011
- Style: Gothic
- Years built: 1195–1198 (first church) 1392 (present church) 1424–1430 (second phase)
- Groundbreaking: 1195 (first church)
- Completed: 1430

Administration
- Diocese: Opole
- Deanery: Nysa
- Parish: St. James and St. Agnes Parish in Nysa

The Basilica of St. James and St. Agnes is a Catholic Church parish church and basilica minor in the New Town area of Nysa, Opole Voivodeship, Poland. Built in the Late Middle Ages, it was the historically the cultural centre of the town and Nysa's largest sacramental building. It is listed as a Historic Monument of Poland.

== History ==
There has been a parish church at the site since the first was built between 1195 and 1198 and consecrated in 1198 by Jarosław, Duke of Opole and Bishop of Wrocław.

The current church was built in two phases. The first stage was built before 1392, when the six-span church was built. The second stage was built between 1424 and 1430, when the chancel and ambulatory were built. St. James's Church was then Nysa's highest building, with its rooftop surpassing other structures in the exceptionally historic part of town. It is the burial site of Duke Wenceslaus II of Legnica from the Piast dynasty. The church was visited several times by King Władysław IV of Poland.

There is a detached bell tower adjacent to the main church building.
