= Verses of Steel =

Studio album by Acid Drinkers
- Released: 7 July 2008 (Poland)
- Recorded: March–April 2008 at Perlazza studio, Opalenica and Jet studio, Nowy Dwór
- Genre: Thrash metal, groove metal
- Length: 51:53
- Label: Mystic Production
- Producer: Ślimak, Olass

Acid Drinkers chronology
| Rock Is Not Enough (2004) | Verses of Steel (2008) | La part du diable (2012) |

Verses of Steel is the twelfth studio album by the Polish thrash metal band Acid Drinkers. It was released on 7 July 2008 in Poland through Mystic Production. It is the only album to feature Alex "Olass" Mendyk due to his death in late November 2008.

The album was recorded from March to April 2008 (drums & vocals were recorded at the Perlazza studio in Opalenica while guitar & bass were recorded at Jet studio in Nowy Dwór). It was mixed at Chimp Studio, London, and Tower Studio, Wrocław. The cover art was created by Mentalporn.com and fotos by Paulina Mencel.

== Track listing ==
| No. | Title | Length |
|---|---|---|
| 1. | "Fuel of My Soul" | 3:12 |
| 2. | "In a Black Sail Wrapped" | 3:26 |
| 3. | "Swallow the Needle" | 5:32 |
| 4. | "The Ark" | 4:25 |
| 5. | "Meltdown of Sanctity" | 3:50 |
| 6. | "We Died Before We Start to Live" | 5:37 |
| 7. | "Red Shining Fur" | 3:58 |
| 8. | "The Rust That I Feed" | 6:34 |
| 9. | "Silver Meat Machine" | 3:52 |
| 10. | "Boneless" | 3:57 |
| 11. | "Blues Beatdown" | 7:37 |

== Reception ==
Professional ratings
Review scores
| Source | Rating |
|---|---|
| Metal Temple | 7/10 stars |

The album was well received in their country, gaining three nominations for the Fryderyk Musical Awards (Poland) for production, composition and best Heavy Metal album.
It was described as a traditional European thrash metal album with a few crossover elements.

== Personnel ==
- Tomasz "Titus" Pukacki – vocals, bass
- Alex "Olass" Mendyk – guitar, vocals
- Dariusz "Popcorn" Popowicz – guitar, vocals
- Maciej "Ślimak" Starosta – drums
- Music and lyrics – Acid Drinkers
- Engineered – Maciej Feddek, Aleksander Mendyk
- Vocal co-producer – Przemysław "Perła" Wjemann
- Bartek Dębicki – solo in "Blues Beatdown"

== Charts ==
| Chart | Country | Peak position |
|---|---|---|
| OLiS | Poland | 9 |

== Release history ==
| Year | Label | Format | Country | Out of Print? | Notes |
|---|---|---|---|---|---|
| 2008 | Mystic Production | CD | Poland | No | Original CD release; digipack |
