= Infernal Connection =

Studio album by Acid Drinkers
- Released: December 1994 (Poland)
- Recorded: 8 September – 3 October 1994
- Studio: Modern Sound Studio, Gdynia
- Genre: Thrash metal, crossover thrash, heavy hardcore
- Length: 39:23
- Label: Mega Czad, Metal Mind Productions
- Producer: Acid Drinkers

Acid Drinkers chronology
Fishdick (1994)	Infernal Connection (1994)	The State of Mind Report (1996)

Infernal Connection is the fifth studio album by Polish thrash metal band Acid Drinkers. It was released in December 1994 in Poland through Mega Czad. The album was recorded from 8 September to 3 October 1994 at Modern Sound Studio in Gdynia. The cover art was created by Tomek Molka and Litza and photos by Kazik Staszewski and Jacek Gulczyński.

Infernal Connection is considered to be one of the most important albums in the Polish rock history.

== Track listing ==
No.	Title	Length
1.	"Hiperenigmatic Stuff of Mr. Nothing"	3:40
2.	"Anybody Home??!!"	3:45
3.	"The Joker"	3:15
4.	"Track Time: 66.6 sec."	1:06
5.	"Drug Dealer"	3:44
6.	"Slow and Stoned/Method of Yonash"	5:04
7.	"Dancing in the Slaughter-House"	2:36
8.	"IQ Cyco"	3:03
9.	"Backyard Bandit"	3:24
10.	"Infernal Connection"	6:42
11.	"Consument" (Kult cover)	3:04

=== Bonus tracks ===
No.	Title	Length
12.	"Slow & Stoned/Method of Yonash – Bonar Remix"	3:39
13.	"Slow & Stoned/Method of Yonash – Techno Jarogniew Remix"	3:45
14.	"Slow & Stoned/Method of Yonash – Bonar Club Remix"	4:29
15.	"Slow & Stoned/Method of Yonash – Acid Studio Praca Wygłup"	4:30

== Personnel ==
- Tomasz "Titus" Pukacki – vocals, bass
- Robert "Litza" Friedrich – guitar, backing vocals, lead vocal on track 4, 6
- Dariusz "Popcorn" Popowicz – guitar
- Maciej "Ślimak" Starosta – drums, backing vocals
- Music and lyrics – Acid Drinkers (except "Consument": Kazik Staszewski)
- Engineered – Adam Toczko, Tomasz Bonarowski
- Mixed – Adam Toczko
- Mastering – Grzegorz Piwkowski
- Kazik Staszewski (Kult) – vocal on track 11
- Grzegorz Skawiński – guitar solo on track 11
- Tomasz Lipnicki (Illusion) – vocal on track 9
- Tomasz Bonarowski – drums on track 5

== Release history ==
Year	Label	Format	Country	Out of print?	Notes
1994	Mega Czad	CD	Poland	Yes	Original CD release
1998	Metal Mind Productions	CD	Poland	Yes	CD reissue
2009	Metal Mind Productions	CD	Poland	No	CD reissue; remastered; digipak; bonus tracks
