= Posłuchaj to do Ciebie =

Studio album by Kult
- Released: October 1987
- Recorded: January 1987
- Genre: Alternative rock, new wave, punk rock, psychedelic rock
- Length: 38:22
- Label: Klub Płytowy "Razem"
- Producer: Władysław Kowalczyk, Tadeusz Czechak

Kult chronology
Kult (1987)	Posłuchaj to do Ciebie (1987)	Spokojnie (1988)

Professional ratings
Review scores
Source	Rating
Teraz Rock	5/5 stars

Posłuchaj to do Ciebie is the second album by Polish punk rock band Kult.

"Na całym świecie źle się dzieje koledzy" and "Wódka" are the same song under different name.

== Track listing ==
All lyrics are written by Kazik Staszewski except where noted.

Side one
No.	Title	Lyrics	Length
1.	"Na całym świecie źle się dzieje koledzy"		5:14
2.	"Hej, czy nie wiecie"		5:20
3.	"Post"		2:45
4.	"Kult"		3:39
5.	"Totalna stabilizacja"	Janusz Grudziński	2:02
Total length:			19:00

Side two
No.	Title	Length
6.	"Narodzeni na nowo"	3:59
7.	"Umarł mój wróg"	2:38
8.	"Elektryczne nożyce"	3:11
9.	"Spokojnie"	4:01
10.	"Rozmyślania wychowanka"	2:25
11.	"Gdziekolwiek idę, z tobą chcę iść"	3:08

1992 CD release
No.	Title	Lyrics	Length
1.	"Piosenka młodych wioślarzy"		3:18
2.	"Piloci"		3:44
3.	"Do Ani"		4:11
4.	"Polska"		5:24
5.	"Babilon"		4:32
6.	"Taniec wielki"		3:41
7.	"Wódka"		5:15
8.	"Hej, czy nie wiecie"		5:21
9.	"Post"		2:45
10.	"Kult"		3:40
11.	"Totalna stabilizacja"	Janusz Grudziński	2:02
12.	"Narodzeni na nowo"		3:59
13.	"Umarł mój wróg"		2:39
14.	"Elektryczne nożyce"		3:12
15.	"Spokojnie"		4:02
16.	"Rozmyślania wychowanka"		2:06
17.	"Gdziekolwiek idę, z tobą chcę iść"		3:09
18.	"Wódka (inna wersja)"		5:12
Total length:			1:08:12

== Personnel ==
All songs on the 1987 release and tracks 4–18 from the 1992 re-release were recorded by:

- Kazik Staszewski – vocals, alto saxophone, drum machine programming
- Janusz Grudziński – lead guitar, keyboards, cello
- Ireneusz Wereński – bass guitar
- Paweł Szanajca – saxophone
- Tadeusz Kisieliński – drums
- Kostek Joriadis – trumpet, congas, keyboards
- Jacek Kufirski – drum machine programming
- Włodzimierz Kowalczyk – sound engineer
- Tadeusz Czechak – sound engineer

Songs 1–3 of 1992 release were recorded by:

- Kazik Staszewski – vocals, saxophone
- Piotr Wieteska – bass guitar
- Janusz Grudziński – lead guitar
- Jacek Szymoniak – keyboards
- Tadeusz Kisieliński – drums
