= Tata Kazika =

Studio album by Kult
- Released: April 1993
- Recorded: February–March 1993
- Genre: Alternative rock, urban folk, sung poetry
- Length: 56:29
- Label: S.P. Records

Kult chronology
Your Eyes (1991)	Tata Kazika (1993)	Muj wydafca (1994)

Tata Kazika is an album by Kult, released in April 1993. It contains the songs written by Kazik's father, Stanisław Staszewski.

== Track listing ==
All tracks by Stanisław Staszewski except where noted.

No.	Title	Lyrics	Length
1.	"Celina"		6:42
2.	"Dziewczyna się bała pogrzebów"		4:28
3.	"Baranek"		4:19
4.	"Notoryczna narzeczona"		3:04
5.	"Królowa życia"		5:00
6.	"Inżynierowie z Petrobudowy"		2:42
7.	"Knajpa morderców"		4:45
8.	"W czarnej urnie"		4:33
9.	"Wróci wiosna, baronowo"	Konstanty Ildefons Gałczyński	5:43
10.	"Marianna"		5:00
11.	"Kurwy wędrowniczki"		4:19
12.	"Bal kreślarzy"		3:05
13.	"Dyplomata" (Only on CD releases)		2:24

== Credits ==
- Kazik Staszewski – lead vocalist, saxophone;
- Krzysztof Banasik – French horn, saxophone, guitar, vocalist;
- Janusz Grudziński – piano, keyboards, vocalist;
- Piotr Morawiec – guitar;
- Andrzej Szymańczak – drumset;
- Ireneusz Wereński – bass guitar;
- Romuald Kunikowski – accordion;
- Wojciech Przybylski – sound engineer;
