= Amazing Atomic Activity =

Studio album by Acid Drinkers
- Released: 17 May 1999
- Recorded: Deo Recordings, Wisła, Poland and Taklamakan Studio, Opalenica, Poland
- Genre: Thrash metal
- Length: 47:44
- Label: Metal Mind
- Producer: Titus, Ślimak

Acid Drinkers chronology
High Proof Cosmic Milk (1998)	Amazing Atomic Activity (1999)	Broken Head (2000)

Professional ratings
Review scores
Source	Rating
Magazyn Gitarzysta	8/10 stars

Amazing Atomic Activity is the eighth studio album by Polish thrash metal band Acid Drinkers. It was released on 17 May 1999. The promotional single of the album was the song "Satisfaction", which is a cover of The Rolling Stones song "(I Can't Get No) Satisfaction". It is the first album to feature rhythm guitarist Przemek "Perła" Wejmann.

The album was remastered and rereleased in 2008 with bonus tracks.

== Track listing ==
All music and lyrics written by Acid Drinkers, except "Satisfaction" written by Jagger–Richards.

No.	Title	Length
1.	"Amazing Atomic Activity"	3:34
2.	"You Better Shoot Me"	4:50
3.	"Satisfaction" (The Rolling Stones cover)	2:39
4.	"Cops Broke My Beer"	3:59
5.	"Wake Up! Here Comes the Acids"	3:49
6.	"My Pick"	4:48
7.	"She's Gonna Be a Porno Star"	4:25
8.	"Justify Me (I Was So Hungry)"	5:13
9.	"Home Submarine"	4:50
10.	"House Full of Reptiles"	3:02
11.	"What a Day"	6:35
Total length:		47:44

Bonus tracks

No.	Title	Length
12.	"Cigarettes"	3:01
13.	"The Last Lap"	4:23
14.	"Human Bazooka (live)"	5:01
Total length:		1:00:09

== Personnel ==
Acid Drinkers

- Tomek "Titus" Pukacki – vocals, bass, cover concept
- Darek "Popcorn" Popowicz – lead guitar
- Maciek "Ślimak" Starosta – drums, production, cover concept
- Przemek "Perła" Wejmann – rhythm guitar, vocals

Production

- Tommy Dziubiński – mixing, production
- Grzegorz Piwkowski – mastering
- Szymon Felkel – artwork
- Steve Wallet – lyrics translation
