= Stanisław Staszewski =

Polish architect and poet (1925–1973)

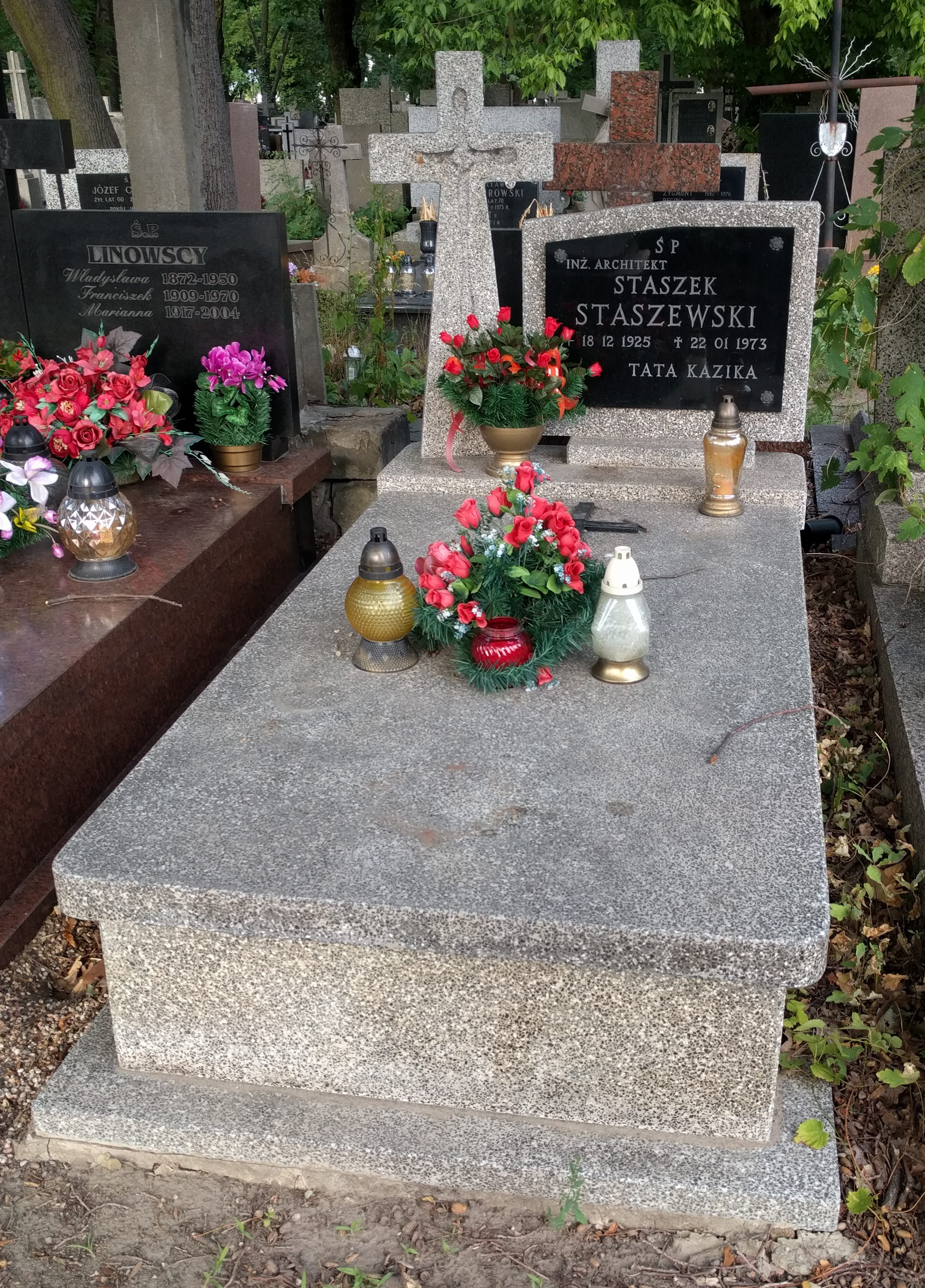
Stanisław Staszewski grave in Bródno cemetery

Stanisław Staszewski (18 December 1925 – 22 January 1973) was a Polish architect and poet. He was the father of Kazimierz Staszewski and the author of many songs and ballads, sung both by his son and by Jacek Kaczmarski.

== Biography ==
Stanisław Staszewski was born on 18 December 1925 in Pabianice to an impoverished szlachta family of a gymnasium headmaster. During World War II young Stanisław was a member of the Armia Krajowa. In its ranks he took part in the failed episode of the Warsaw Uprising in the borough of Praga. Taken prisoner by the Germans he faced the risk of being executed and instead managed to convince the German soldiers of his German ancestry and willingness to join the Wehrmacht. Along with several of his colleagues he was allowed to join the German army - and defected the following day. However, he was again caught by the Germans and sent to Mauthausen-Gusen concentration camp. There, in March 1945, he narrowly escaped death when he became a Muselmann and was placed on a pile of corpses bound for cremation. However, he was discovered by the inmates running the camp and managed to survive until liberation.

After the war Staszewski returned to Warsaw, where he graduated from the faculty of architecture of the Warsaw University of Technology. He also became an active member of various student cultural societies. About that time he also wrote some of his first songs and poems. In 1961 he moved to Płock, where he became the city's chief architect. Although initially a communist and a member of the Polish United Workers' Party, Staszewski's poems were found dangerous by the party's authorities and he was expelled from it. In 1967, through Hungary, Staszewski with his wife emigrated to Paris and then to Boulogne-sur-Mer, where he wrote the majority of his poems. He also recorded some of them as bootleg songs on a tape recorder. He died on 22 January 1973 in Paris and was buried at Warsaw's Bródno Cemetery.

Virtually unknown during his lifetime, Staszewski's songs became popular in late 1970s and 1980s thanks to Jacek Kaczmarski, who performed a number of them during his concerts. Staszewski's son Kazik published two popular records with his band Kult featuring his father's compositions: Tata Kazika, Tata 2, and one in solo discography Tata Kazika Kontra Hedora
