= Rock Is Not Enough =

Studio album by Acid Drinkers
- Released: 24 May 2004
- Recorded: Taklamakan, Opalenica, and Elektra Studio, Warsaw
- Genre: Thrash metal, heavy metal
- Length: 42:35
- Label: Sony Music
- Producer: Adam Toczko, Ślimak

Acid Drinkers chronology
Acidofilia (2002)	Rock Is Not Enough (2004)	Verses of Steel (2008)

Rock Is Not Enough is the eleventh studio album by Polish thrash metal band Acid Drinkers. It was released on 24 May 2004. It is the only album to feature Tomek "Lipa" Lipnicki.

The album was mastered at Studio Master and Seven in Hamburg, Germany. The original working title of the album was Rock Is Not Enough... Give Me the Metal!. The first pressings of the album were released with an outer cardboard cover.

== Track listing ==
All lyrics written by Titus. All music composed by Acid Drinkers.

No.	Title	Length
1.	"Extreme Entertainment Group of Oddities (E.E.G.O.O.)"	5:26
2.	"Life Hurts More Than Death"	4:08
3.	"The Ball and the Line"	3:24
4.	"Fill Me (In 100%)"	4:06
5.	"Black Blood Canyon"	5:16
6.	"When You Say to Me "Fuck You", Say It Louder"	3:46
7.	"Stray Bullets"	4:01
8.	"Jennifer and Ben"	3:59
9.	"Primal Nature"	3:21
10.	"Hate Unlimited"	5:11
Total length:		42:35

== Credits ==
Acid Drinkers

- Tomek "Titus" Pukacki – vocals, bass, artwork
- Darek "Popcorn" Popowicz – lead guitar
- Maciek "Ślimak" Starosta – drums, production
- Tomek "Lipa" Lipnicki – rhythm guitar, vocals on "The Ball and the Line" and "Stray Bullets"

Additional musicians

- Bolek – guitars on "Hate Unlimited" and "Stray Bullets"

Production

- Adam Toczko – mixing, production
- Marie Sokolowski – artwork
- Gosia Taklińska – product manager
- Anna "Dudzia" Dudzewicz – lyrics translation
