= Ostateczny krach systemu korporacji =

Studio album by Kult
- Released: May 4, 1998
- Recorded: Hard-Record Studio; January - March 1998
- Genre: Rock
- Length: 76:12
- Label: S.P. Records

Kult chronology
| Tata 2 (1996) | Ostateczny krach systemu korporacji (1998) | Salon Recreativo (2001) |

Professional ratings
Review scores
| Source | Rating |
|---|---|
| AllMusic | 4.5/5 stars |

Ostateczny krach systemu korporacji is an album by Kult, released on May 4, 1998, through S.P. Records.

== Track listing ==
All tracks by Kult (music) and Kazik Staszewski (lyrics).

| No. | Title | Length |
|---|---|---|
| 1. | "Goopya peezda" | 4:30 |
| 2. | "Lewy Czerwcowy" | 4:07 |
| 3. | "Grzesznik" | 4:18 |
| 4. | "Gdy Nie Ma Dzieci" | 2:57 |
| 5. | "Z Archiwum Polskiego Jazzu" | 3:50 |
| 6. | "3 Gwiazdy" | 5:11 |
| 7. | "Poznaj Swój Raj" | 4:46 |
| 8. | "Dziewczyna Bez Zęba Na Przedzie" | 6:38 |
| 9. | "Kto Wie" | 5:06 |
| 10. | "Fever, Fever, Fever" | 4:18 |
| 11. | "Jatne" | 6:31 |
| 12. | "Ja Wiem To" | 4:34 |
| 13. | "Kto Śmie Traktować Cię Źle" | 4:43 |
| 14. | "Idź Przodem" | 5:17 |
| 15. | "Krew Jak Śnieg" | 4:35 |
| 16. | "Komu Bije Dzwon" | 3:43 |
| 17. | ".." | 1:08 |

== Singles ==
All singles released in 1998 through S.P. Records

- "Panie Waldku, Pan się nie boi czyli lewy czerwcowy"
- "Komu bije dzwon"
- "Gdy nie ma dzieci"
- "Dziewczyna bez zęba na przedzie"
