= Broken Head (album) =

Studio album by Acid Drinkers
- Released: 2 October 2000
- Recorded: Studio Psalm, Warsaw, Taklamakan Studio, Opalenica, and Larronerma Recording Institute, Poznań
- Genre: Thrash metal, heavy metal
- Length: 31:46
- Label: Metal Mind
- Producer: Tomasz Dziubiński, Jacek Chraplak, Perła, Ślimak

Acid Drinkers chronology
Amazing Atomic Activity (1999)	Broken Head (2000)	Acidofilia (2002)

Broken Head is the ninth studio album by Polish thrash metal band Acid Drinkers. It was released on 2 October 2000. The album was mixed at Larronerma Recording Institute in Poznań.

== Track listing ==
All music composed by Acid Drinkers. All lyrics written by Titus, except "El Pecado" and "Red and Grey" written by Perła.

No.	Title	Length
1.	"Superstitious Motherfucker"	4:11
2.	"Dog Rock"	3:06
3.	"El Pecado"	5:40
4.	"Calista"	3:59
5.	"Don't Go to Where I Sleep"	4:10
6.	"Rubber Hammer and a Broken Head"	1:30
7.	"There's So Much Hatred in the Air"	5:58
8.	"The Wildest Planet in Space"	3:12
Total length:		31:46

Bonus tracks

No.	Title	Length
9.	"Youth"	3:50
10.	"Red and Grey"	4:55
11.	"Don't Go to Where I Sleep" (Video)	3:41
Total length:		44:12

== Personnel ==
Acid Drinkers

- Tomek "Titus" Pukacki – vocals, bass, cover concept
- Darek "Popcorn" Popowicz – lead guitar
- Maciek "Ślimak" Starosta – drums, production, recording, mixing
- Przemek "Perła" Wejmann – rhythm guitar, vocals on "El Pecado" and "Red and Grey", production, recording, mixing, cover concept

Production

- Tomasz Dziubiński – production
- Grzegorz Piwkowski – mastering
- Jacek Chraplak – production, recording, mixing
- Tomasz Mielcarz – photography
