= Muj wydafca =

Studio album by Kult
- Released: October 1, 1994
- Recorded: June 1994
- Genre: Rock
- Length: 70:56
- Label: S.P. Records

Kult chronology
Tata Kazika (1993)	Muj wydafca (1994)	Tata 2 (1996)

Muj wydafca is an album by Kult, released on October 1, 1994.

== Track listing ==
All tracks by Kult (music) and Kazik Staszewski (lyrics) except where noted.

No.	Title	Writer(s)	Length
1.	"Ręce do góry"		3:21
2.	"Lewe lewe loff"		3:52
3.	"Keszitsen kepet onmagarol"		4:00
4.	"Onyx"		4:48
5.	"Gaz na ulicach"		2:20
6.	"Oczy niebieskie"		1:35
7.	"Pasażer"	Iggy Pop, Ricky Gardiner	5:35
8.	"Historia pewnej miłości"		5:36
9.	"Mój wydawca"		3:56
10.	"Kulcikriu"		3:15
11.	"Bliskie spotkanie 3. stopnia"		4:12
12.	"Krutkie kazanie na temat jazdy na maxa"		3:25
13.	"Na zachód!"		4:33
14.	"Dziewczyna o perłowych włosach"	Anna Adamis, Gábor Presser	4:30
15.	"Psalm 151"		5:46
16.	"Piosenka młodych wioślarzy"		4:47
17.	"Setka wódki"		5:11

== Credits ==
- Kazik Staszewski – lead vocalist, synthesizer;
- Janusz Grudziński – piano, keyboards, guitar;
- Krzysztof Banasik – French horn, guitar, keyboards;
- Piotr Morawiec – guitar; banjo;
- Ireneusz Wereński – bass guitar;
- Andrzej Szymańczak – drumset;
- Jerzy Pomianowski – tabla;
- Wojciech Przybylski – sound engineer;
