= Dirty Money, Dirty Tricks =

Studio album by Acid Drinkers
- Released: June 1991
- Recorded: February 1991
- Genre: Thrash metal
- Length: 47:02
- Label: Under One Flag
- Producer: Tomasz Dziubiński

Acid Drinkers chronology
Are You a Rebel? (1990)	Dirty Money, Dirty Tricks (1991)	Strip Tease (1992)

Dirty Money, Dirty Tricks is the second studio album by a Polish thrash metal band Acid Drinkers. It was recorded in Studio Giełda in Poznań in February 1991. The band's former album, Are You a Rebel?, was still to be released in Poland in April. Similarly to their former act, also Dirty Money, Dirty Tricks met its first release in Europe in June 1991. It was made available in Poland three months later.

The original idea of the album's title was Street Metal, but it was then changed into Dirty Money, Dirty Tricks. Its cover presents a guy in a hat labelled ACID put by Tomasz Dziubiński into a money-producing meat grinder. Both the title and the cover art represent the band's lack of financial satisfaction from their label.

This album is softer and mellower, but also noticeably richer musically, than Are You a Rebel?. It also features much more humour, e.g. in "Yahoo". The best known tracks from this album are "Street Rockin" and a cover of Deep Purple's classic, "Smoke on the Water".

== Track listing ==
1. "Are You a Rebel?" – 2:58
2. "Too Many Cops" – 3:14
3. "Acid Drinker" – 4:40
4. "Smoke on the Water" (Deep Purple cover) – 4:26
5. "Yahoo" – 1:09
6. "Max – He Was Here Again" – 3:35
7. "Ziomas" – 4:11
8. "Traditional Birthday" – 0:27
9. "Dirty Money, Dirty Tricks" – 2:58
10. "Angry and Bloody" – 3:29
11. "Street Rockin'" – 4:05
12. "We Gotta Find Some Power" – 4:32
13. "Don't Touch Me" – 3:34
14. "Zorba" – 0:25
15. "Flooded with Wine" – 4:11

== Personnel ==
- Tomasz "Titus" Pukacki – lead vocals, bass
- Robert "Litza" Friedrich – guitar, lead & backing vocals
- Darek "Popcorn" Popowicz – guitar, backing vocals
- Maciej "Ślimak" Starosta – drums
