= Acidophile (disambiguation) =

An acidophile is an organism that thrives under highly acidic conditions.

Acidophile may also refer to:

- Acidophile (histology), a particular staining pattern of cells and tissues when using haematoxylin and eosin stains

== See also ==
- Acidofilia, 2002 album by Acid Drinkers
- Acidophil cell in the anterior pituitary
- Lactobacillus acidophilus, a species of bacteria
- Acidophobe, antonym of acidophile
