= Strip Tease (Acid Drinkers album) =

Studio album by Acid Drinkers
- Released: September 1992
- Recorded: June/July 1992
- Genre: Thrash metal
- Length: 54:18
- Label: Under One Flag
- Producer: Tomasz Dziubiński

Acid Drinkers chronology
| Dirty Money, Dirty Tricks (1991) | Strip Tease (1992) | Vile Vicious Vision (1993) |

Strip Tease is the third studio album by a Polish thrash metal band Acid Drinkers, released in 1992. It was recorded in Izabelin Studio near Warsaw. The album features fifteen tracks sung not only by Titus and Litza, but also Popcorn. It includes two cover songs: an acoustic version of Metallica's "Seek & Destroy", sung by a Polish artist, Edyta Bartosiewicz; and "Menel Song/Always Look on the Bright Side of Life", a remake of a song by Monty Python. This song was a result of band watching Life of Brian, as it had not been planned to be recorded.

== Track listing ==
1. "Strip Tease" – 3:05
2. "King Kong Bless You" – 2:15
3. "Seek & Destroy" (Metallica cover) – 3:17
4. "Rock'N'Roll Beast" – 4:13
5. "Rats / Feeling Nasty" – 3:52
6. "Poplin' Twist" – 4:02
7. "Masterhood of Hearts Devouring" – 3:59
8. "You Are Lost My Dear" – 3:37
9. "Menel Song / Always Look on the Bright Side of Life" (Monty Python) – 2:26
10. "Blood Is Boiling" – 4:24
11. "My Caddish Promise" – 3:53
12. "Mentally Deficient" – 3:39
13. "Hell It Is a Place on Earth" – 4:08
14. "Ronnie and the Brother Spider" – 2:47
15. "I'm a Rocker" – 4:33

== Personnel ==
- Tomasz "Titus" Pukacki – vocals, bass
- Robert "Litza" Friedrich – guitar, vocals (on tracks 5, 6)
- Darek "Popcorn" Popowicz – guitar, vocals (2, 11)
- Maciej "Ślimak" Starosta – drums
