= Acid Drinkers =

Polish thrash metal band

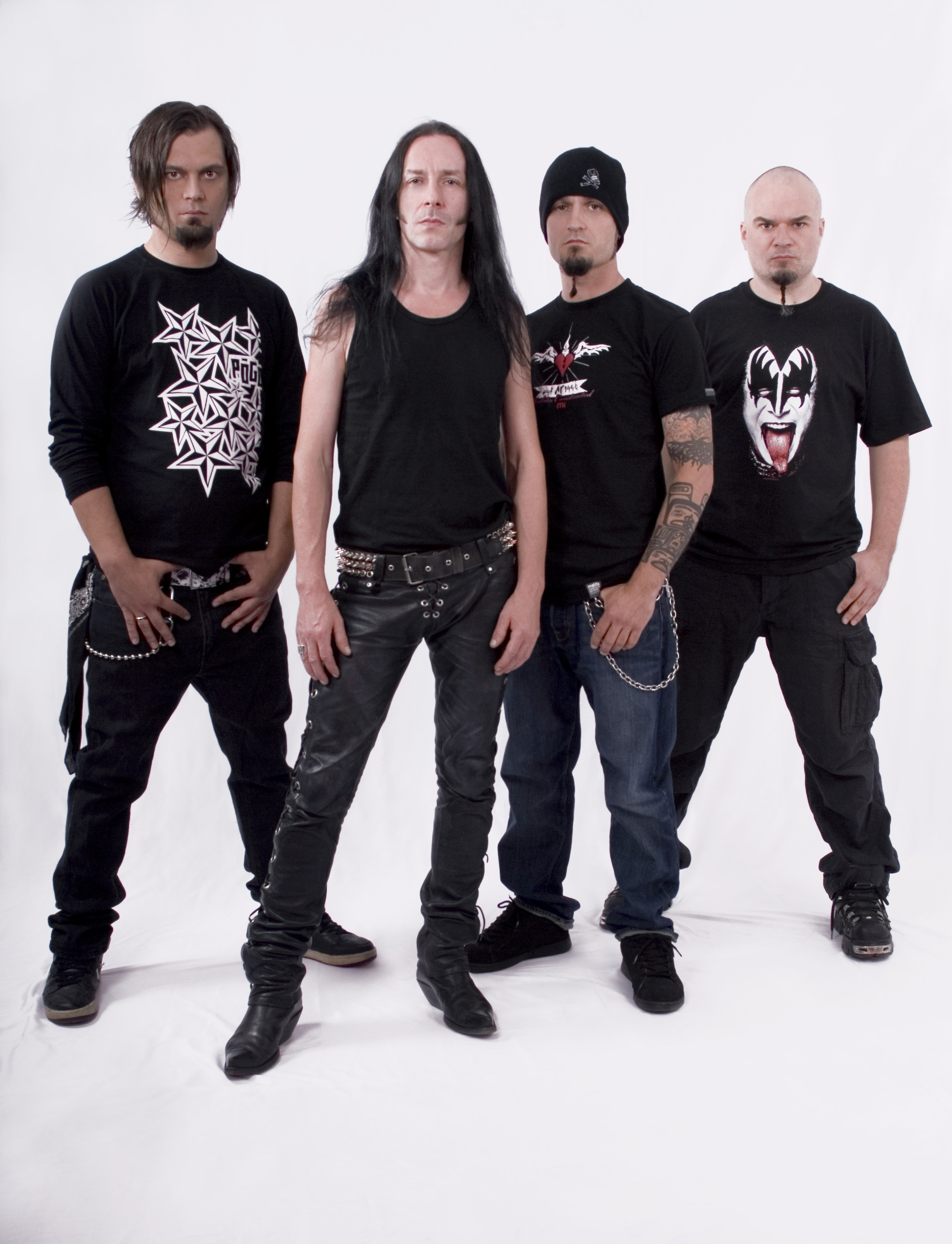
- L-R: Aleksander "Olass" Mendyk, Tomasz "Titus" Pukacki, Maciej "Ślimak" Starosta and Darek "Popcorn" Popowicz (2008)

Background information
- Origin: Poznań, Poland
- Genres: Thrash metal, heavy metal, crossover thrash
- Years active: 1986–present
- Labels: Metal Mind, Under One Flag, Sony Music Entertainment Poland, Mystic
- Members: Tomasz "Titus" Pukacki; Darek "Popcorn" Popowicz; Maciej "Ślimak" Starosta; Robert "Litza" Friedrich
- Past members: Przemek "Perla" Wejmann; Tomek "Lipa" Lipnicki; Aleksander "Olass" Mendyk †; Wojciech "Jankiel" Moryto; Robert "Bobby" Zembrzycki; Łukasz "Dzwon" Cyndzer

Acid Drinkers are a Polish thrash metal band formed in September 1986 in Poznań. Acid Drinkers were formed on 21 September 1986 consisting of Tomasz "Titus" Pukacki (vocals, bass) and Robert "Litza" Friedrich (guitar, vocals). The band's style is thrash metal, with influences of heavy metal and hardcore punk. Acid Drinkers are rated as one of the most important bands in the Polish thrash and heavy metal world.

== History ==
The band's lineup expanded as Dariusz "Popcorn" Popowicz (lead guitar) and a drummer Piotr "Chomik" Kulk (shortly after replaced by Maciej "Ślepy" Głuchowski) joined the band. With this lineup, the band worked on its own compositions, such as "Barmy Army", "Del Rocca" and "I Mean Acid". Within a month of the band's creation, Pukacki was called to join the army and left the band for two years. The others did not intend to idle their time away; Friedrich and Popowicz undertook a reactivation of the band named Slavoy. Soon both of them received a proposal to play for reputable groups: Popowicz from Wolf Spider, and Friedrich from Turbo.

After returning from the army, Pukacki tried to reactivate his first band, Los Desperados. His attempts failed and Pukacki himself, after meeting with Popowicz, decided to reform Acid Drinkers with Friedrich and Maciek "Ślimak" Starosta. Their debut took place 26 August 1989 on Słodowa Island in Wrocław. That performance was actually the beginning of the band's true career. Rumors about a new heavy metal group swiftly spread across Poland. Soon afterwards, the band received an opportunity to record an album. With this line-up came their best-known classics, including their debut, Are You a Rebel?, Vile Vicious Vision, and their most famous, Infernal Connection. At the end of 1998, Friedrich decided to leave the band. Przemysław "Perła" Wejmann, a vocalist and guitarist and a leader of Guess Why, replaced him. With Wejmann on board, the Acids recorded three albums: Amazing Atomic Activity, Broken Head and Acidofilia. At the very beginning of 2003, Wejmann decided to leave the band. It took almost a month before a new guitarist was chosen. The new member, Tomek "Lipa" Lipnicki, turned out to be a well-known frontman of an already-disbanded group, Illusion. Together with Lipnicki, the Acids recorded a well-received long-play, Rock Is Not Enough. After over a year of cooperation, the new guitarist left Acid Drinkers for his own project, Lipali. His place in the band was taken over by Aleksander "Olass" Mendyk from None. The new member of Acid's crew quickly integrated himself into the band and was an active member. The band released a critically acclaimed album Verses of Steel, with most of the songs written by the new guitarist. On 30 November 2008, Mendyk died from circulatory failure in Kraków, at the age of 29. He was replaced on 9 May 2009 by Wojciech "Jankiel" Moryto.

Acid Drinkers are widely considered the best thrash metal band in Poland. Their popularity has gone far beyond the typical metal music sphere. The Acids have played over 500 shows, including in major festivals such as Jarocin, Metalmania, Węgorzewo, Przystanek Woodstock and Odjazdy; they performed at many of these festivals as headliners. They preceded performances in Poland by, among others, Deep Purple, Megadeth, Bruce Dickinson, Sepultura, Paradise Lost and Slayer. Moreover, many known Polish artists such as Edyta Bartosiewicz, Kazik Staszewski, Tomek Lipnicki, Patrycja Kosiarkiewicz and Grzegorz Skawiński took part in Acids' recordings. Acid Drinkers were four times (in 1998, 2000, 2004, 2009) awarded with a Fryderyk in the hard and heavy category, and in 1998 TVP 2 awarded them the "Złoty bączek" (Golden spinning top) award for being the best music group from Poland. Additionally, they were acknowledged as one of the five best Polish artists of the 1990s (together with Hey, Kazik Staszewski, Edyta Bartosiewicz and O.N.A.) by journalists and readers of Tylko Rock (Only Rock) magazine.

In 2010, the band released a second cover album called Fishdick Zwei - The Dick Is Rising Again. The band members covered compositions from artists such as Red Hot Chili Peppers, Metallica, Slayer, Frank Sinatra Donna Summer, The B52's, and guests (Anna Brachaczek team BiFF and Czesław Mozil).

== Band members ==
=== Current ===
- Tomek "Titus" Pukacki – vocals, bass (1986–present)
- Darek "Popcorn" Popowicz – lead guitar (1986–present)
- Robert "Litza" Friedrich – rhythm guitar, vocals (1986–1998, 2024–present)
- Maciek "Ślimak" Starosta – drums (1989–present)

=== Former ===
- Piotr "Chomik" Kuik – drums (1986)
- Maciej "Ślepy" Głuchowski – drums (1986)
- Przemek "Perła" Wejmann – rhythm guitar, vocals (1998–2002)
- Tomek "Lipa" Lipnicki – rhythm guitar, vocals (2003–2004)
- Alex "Olass" Mendyk – rhythm guitar, vocals (2004–2008; died 2008)
- Wojciech "Jankiel" Moryto – rhythm guitar, vocals (2009–2016)
- Łukasz "Dzwon" Cyndzer – rhythm guitar, vocals (2017–2024)

=== Live ===
- Paweł "Paulo" Grzegorczyk – rhythm guitar (1994)
- Robert "Bobby" Zembrzycki – rhythm guitar (2017)
- Hubert Więcek – lead guitar (2019)

== Discography ==
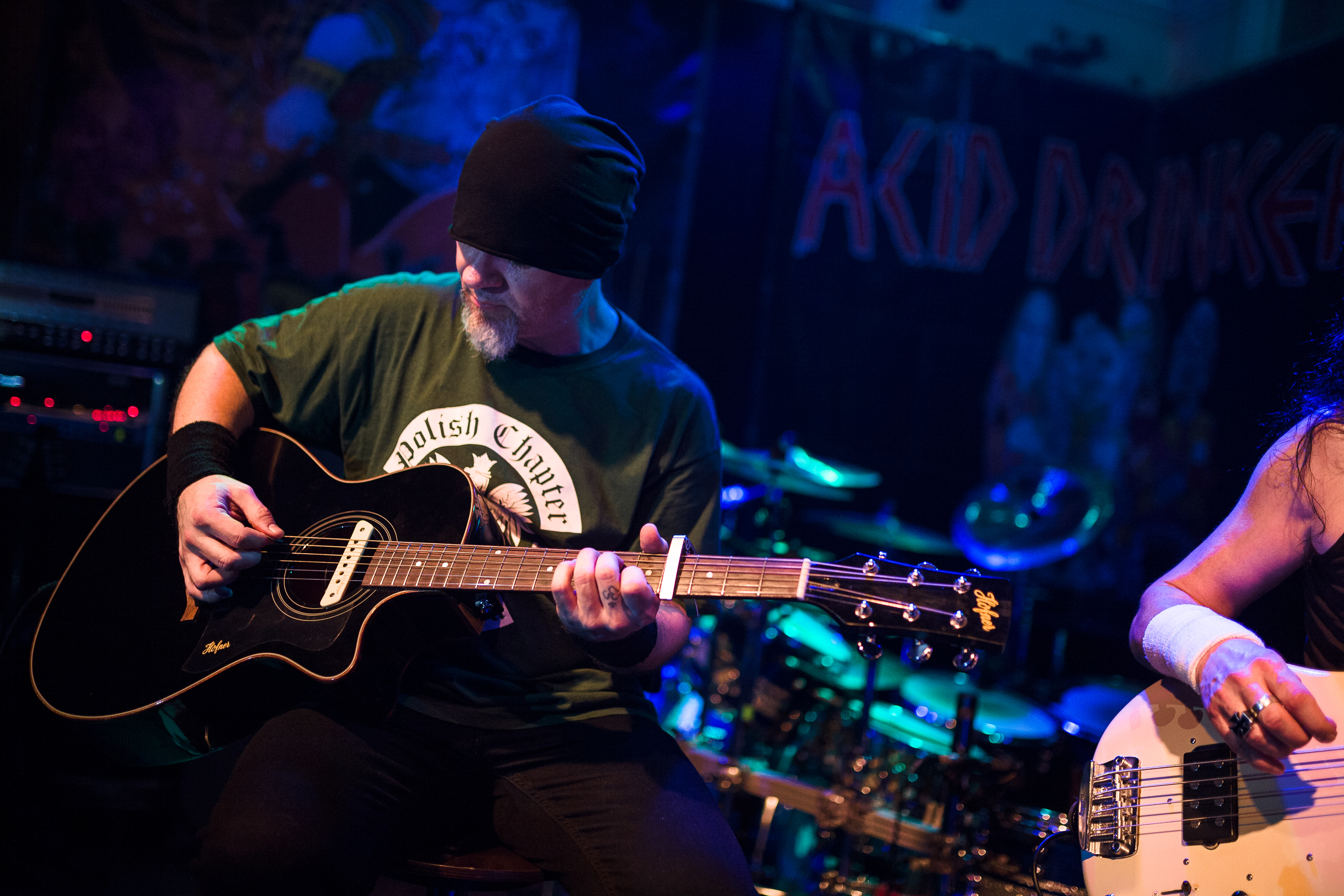
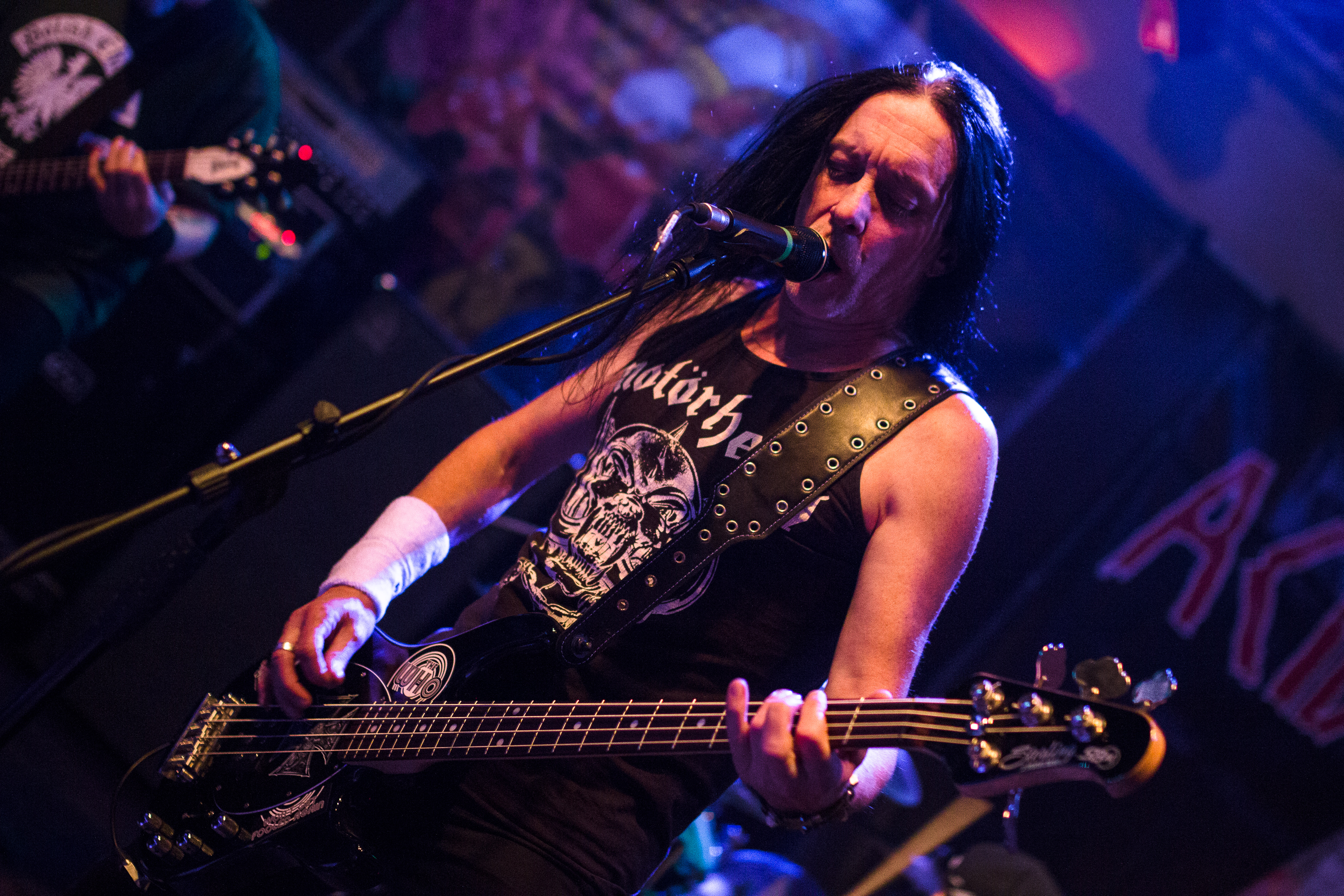
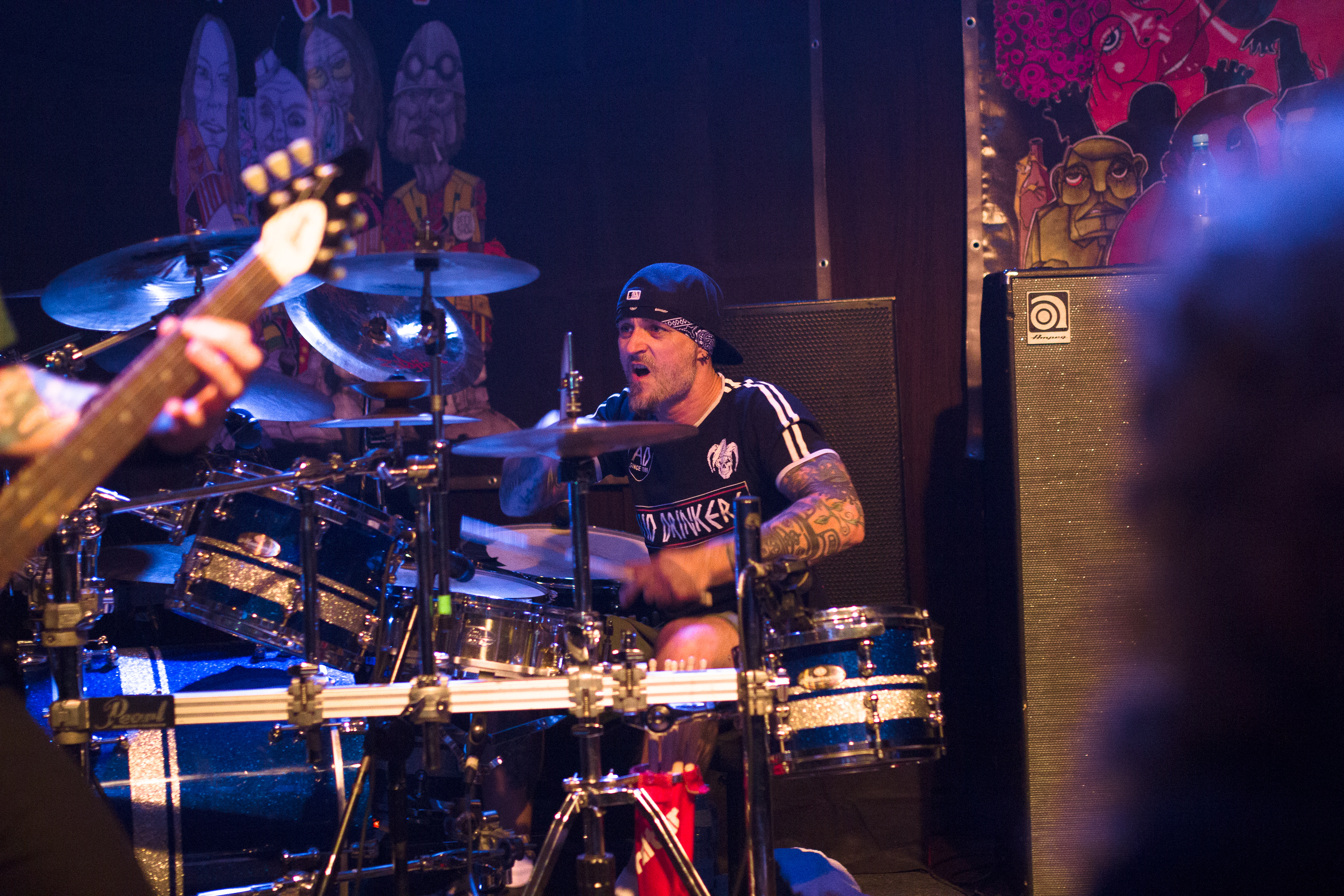
Acid Drinkers performing in 2016

=== Studio albums ===
| Title | Album details | Peak chart positions |
| Title | Album details | POL |
|---|---|---|
| Are You a Rebel? | Released: 9 September 1990; Label: Under One Flag; Formats: CD | — |
| Dirty Money, Dirty Tricks | Released: 17 June 1991; Label: Under One Flag; Formats: CD | — |
| Strip Tease | Released: 14 September 1992; Label: Under One Flag; Formats: CD | — |
| Vile Vicious Vision | Released: 10 October 1993; Label: Loud Out Records; Formats: CD, digital download | — |
| Infernal Connection | Released: December 1994; Label: Mega Czad Co.; Formats: CD | — |
| The State of Mind Report | Released: 22 April 1996; Label: Polton; Formats: CD | — |
| High Proof Cosmic Milk | Released: 18 March 1998; Label: Metal Mind Productions; Formats: CD | — |
| Amazing Atomic Activity | Released: 17 May 1999; Label: Metal Mind Productions; Formats: CD | — |
| Broken Head | Released: 9 October 2000; Label: Metal Mind Productions; Formats: CD | 15 |
| Acidofilia | Released: 24 June 2002; Label: Sony Music; Formats: CD | 25 |
| Rock Is Not Enough | Released: 24 May 2004; Label: Sony Music; Formats: CD | 16 |
| Verses of Steel | Released: 7 July 2008; Label: Mystic Production; Formats: CD, digital download | 9 |
| La part du diable | Released: 19 October 2012; Label: Mystic Production; Formats: CD, digital download | 6 |
| 25 Cents for a Riff | Released: 6 October 2014; Label: Mystic Production; Formats: CD, digital download | 4 |
| Peep Show | Released: 23 September 2016; Label: Makumba Music; Formats: CD, digital download | - |
"—" denotes a release that did not chart.

=== Cover albums ===
| Title | Album details | Peak chart positions |
| Title | Album details | POL |
|---|---|---|
| Fishdick | Released: 6 June 1994; Label: Loud Out Records; Formats: CD, digital download | — |
| Fishdick Zwei – The Dick Is Rising Again | Released: 1 September 2010; Label: Mystic Production; Formats: CD, digital download | 3 |
"—" denotes a release that did not chart.

=== Compilation albums ===
| Title | Album details |
|---|---|
| Maximum Overload | Released: 9 September 2002; Label: Metal Mind Productions; Formats: CD |
| Acid Empire Anthology 1989–2008 | Released: 7 July 2008; Label: Metal Mind Productions; Formats: CD |

=== Live albums ===
| Title | Album details |
|---|---|
| Varran Strikes Back: Alive! | Released: 14 September 1998; Label: Metal Mind Productions; Formats: CD |

=== Video albums ===
| Title | Video details |
|---|---|
| 15 Screwed Years | Released: 14 June 2004; Label: Metal Mind Productions; Formats: DVD |
| The Hand That Rocks the Coffin | Released: 5 August 2006; Label: Metal Mind Productions; Formats: DVD+CD |

=== Music videos ===
| Year | Title | Directed | Album |
|---|---|---|---|
| 1992 | "Menel Song / Always Look..." | — | Strip Tease |
| 1993 | "Zero" | — | Vile Vicious Vision |
| 1993 | "Midnight Visitor" | — | Vile Vicious Vision |
| 1993 | "Pizza Driver" | — | Vile Vicious Vision |
| 1994 | "Track Time 66,6" | — | Infernal Connection |
| 1996 | "2B1" | — | The State of Mind Report |
| 1998 | "High Proof Cosmic Milk" | — | High Proof Cosmic Milk |
| 1998 | "Sad Like a Coal Check" | Łukasz Jankowski | High Proof Cosmic Milk |
| 1998 | "Proud Mary" | Łukasz Jankowski | High Proof Cosmic Milk |
| 1999 | "Satisfaction" (The Rolling Stones cover) | Łukasz Jankowski | Amazing Atomic Activity |
| 2000 | "Don't Go to Where I Sleep" | Łukasz Jankowski | Broken Head |
| 2002 | "Disease Foundation" | — | Acidofilia |
| 2002 | "Acidofilia" | — | Acidofilia |
| 2004 | "Hate Unlimited" | Łukasz Jankowski | Rock Is Not Enough |
| 2004 | "E.E.G.O.O." | Łukasz Jankowski | Rock Is Not Enough |
| 2008 | "Swallow the Needle" | CVK Studio Filmowe | Verses of Steel |
| 2008 | "Blues Beatdown (In Memory of Olass)" | Gunn, Wicek, Krzyk, Blonson | — |
| 2010 | "Love Shack" (The B-52's cover) | TakeOne Studio | Fishdick Zwei – The Dick Is Rising Again |
| 2011 | "Hit the Road Jack" (Ray Charles cover) | TakeOne Studio | Fishdick Zwei – The Dick Is Rising Again |
| 2012 | "Old Sparky" | TakeOne Studio | La Part Du Diable |
