= Acidofilia =

Studio album by Acid Drinkers
- Released: 13 May 2002
- Recorded: Deo Recordings, Wisła, Dom Kultury Taklamakan, Opalenica, and Larronerma Recording Institute, Poznań
- Genre: Thrash metal, heavy metal
- Length: 47:03
- Label: Sony Music Entertainment
- Producer: Jacek Chraplak, Perła, Ślimak

Acid Drinkers chronology
Broken Head (2000)	Acidofilia (2002)	Rock Is Not Enough (2004)

Acidofilia is the tenth studio album by Polish thrash metal band Acid Drinkers. It was released on 13 May 2002. The album was mastered at High-End Studio by Grzegorz Piwkowski. It was rereleased in 2008 by Metal Mind with a bonus video for the song "Acidofilia". It is the final album to feature Przemek "Perła" Wejmann.

The album title was created by Dariusz "Maleo" Malejonek (Maleo Reggae Rockers, Izrael, Houk, 2Tm2,3, and Arka Noego). The original album cover featured frontman Titus pregnant, but was quickly changed before the release of the album.

== Track listing ==
All music composed by Acid Drinkers. All lyrics written by Titus, except "Pig to Rent" and "Hydrogen" written by Perła.

No.	Title	Length
1.	"Intro"	0:24
2.	"Disease Foundation"	4:18
3.	"Drunk Eyes"	4:56
4.	"Pig to Rent"	3:47
5.	"Be Careful with This Gun, Daughter!"	4:36
6.	"Hydrogen"	5:10
7.	"Stick Around"	4:31
8.	"Edmund's Hypocrisy"	3:57
9.	"Dammed Diamonds"	4:22
10.	"Propaganda"	5:07
11.	"Acidofilia"	5:55
Total length:		47:03

== Personnel ==
Acid Drinkers

- Tomek "Titus" Pukacki – vocals, bass
- Darek "Popcorn" Popowicz – lead guitar
- Maciek "Ślimak" Starosta – drums, production, mixing, cover concept
- Przemek "Perła" Wejmann – rhythm guitar, production, mixing, cover concept, graphic design

Production

- Jacek Chraplak – production, mixing
- Grzegorz Piwkowski – mastering
- Krzysztof Tokarski – cover concept, graphic design, artwork
- Tomasz Mielcarz – photography
