= La part du diable (album) =

Studio album by Acid Drinkers
- Released: 17 October 2012 (Poland)
- Recorded: 2012 at Perlazza studio, Opalenica
- Genre: Thrash metal
- Length: 47:46
- Label: Mystic Production

Acid Drinkers chronology
Fishdick Zwei – The Dick Is Rising Again (2010)	La part du diable (2012)	25 Cents for a Riff (2014)

La part du diable is the thirteenth studio album by Polish thrash metal band Acid Drinkers. It was released on 17 October 2012 through Mystic Production. It is the first album to feature Wojciech "Jankiel" Moryto.

The album was recorded at the Perlazza studio in Opalenica. This studio belongs to ex-band member Przemysław "Perła" Wejmann. It was mixed at Chimp Studio by Jacek Miłaszewski. The cover art was created by Aleksandra Spanowicz.

== Track listing ==
No.	Title	Length
1.	"Kill the Gringo"	4:22
2.	"The Trick"	3:03
3.	"Old Sparky"	4:26
4.	"On the Beautiful Bloody Danube"	4:53
5.	"Dance Semi-Macabre"	5:04
6.	"V.O.O.W."	3:52
7.	"Bundy's DNA"	3:38
8.	"Andrew's Strategy"	4:39
9.	"The Payback"	4:39
10.	"Broken Real Good"	4:50
11.	"Zombie Nation"	4:21

== Personnel ==
Band

- Tomasz "Titus" Pukacki – vocals, bass
- Wojciech "Jankiel" Moryto – guitar, backing vocals, lead vocals (on tracks 5, 11)
- Dariusz "Popcorn" Popowicz – guitar, backing vocals,
- Maciej "Ślimak" Starosta – drums, backing vocals, production

Additional musicians

- Michał "Mihau" Kaleciński – bass (on tracks 8, 11)

Additional personnel

- Przemysław "Perła" Wejmann – engineering
- Jacek Miłaszewski – mixing
- Aleksandra Spanowicz – cover art
- Łukasz "Pachu" Pach – album graphics
