= Fishdick =

Studio album of cover tracks by Acid Drinkers
- Released: June 1994 (Poland)
- Recorded: 22 January – 20 March 1994 at Modern Sound Studio, Gdynia
- Genre: Thrash metal
- Length: 37:34
- Label: Loud Out Records, Metal Mind Productions
- Producer: Tomasz Dziubiński

Acid Drinkers chronology
| Vile Vicious Vision (1993) | Fishdick (1994) | Infernal Connection (1994) |

Reissue CD cover

Fishdick is a cover album by Polish thrash metal band Acid Drinkers. It was released in June 1994 through Loud Out Records. The album was recorded from 22 January to 20 March 1994 at Modern Sound Studio in Gdynia. The cover art was created by Tomek Daniłowicz.

The reissue of the album features a different cover featuring the members of the band wearing makeup worn by American rock band Kiss.

== Track listing ==
| No. | Title | Writer(s) | Length |
|---|---|---|---|
| 1. | "Ace of Spades" | Motörhead | 3:01 |
| 2. | "Oh, No! Bruno" | NoMeansNo | 3:08 |
| 3. | "Deuce" | Kiss | 3:10 |
| 4. | "N.I.B." | Black Sabbath | 3:34 |
| 5. | "Another Brick in the Wall" | Pink Floyd | 7:20 |
| 6. | "Whole Lotta Rosie" | AC/DC | 3:44 |
| 7. | "Run Run Away" | Slade | 3:04 |
| 8. | "Fuckin' the Tiger" | Acid Drinkers | 3:04 |
| 9. | "Highway Star" | Deep Purple | 2:59 |
| 10. | "Balada" | Flapjack | 4:30 |

=== Bonus Tracks ===
| No. | Title | Length |
|---|---|---|
| 11. | "N.I.B (radio version)" | 3:34 |

== Personnel ==
- Tomasz "Titus" Pukacki – vocal, bass
- Robert "Litza" Friedrich – backing vocals, guitar
- Dariusz "Popcorn" Popowicz – guitar, vocals on track 2
- Maciej "Ślimak" Starosta – drums, vocals on track 10
- Engineered – Adam Toczko, Tomek Bonarowski
- Mixed – Piotr Madziar, Litza
- Grzegorz Skawiński – guitar solo in "Deuce"
- Kuba Mańkowski – guitar solo in "Highway Star"
- Kisiel – guitar solo in "Highway Star"
- Patrycja – vocal in "Balada"

== Release history ==
| Year | Label | Format | Country | Out of print? | Notes |
|---|---|---|---|---|---|
| 1994 | Loud Out Records | CD | Poland | Yes | Original CD release |
| 1997 | Metal Mind Productions | CD | Poland | Yes | CD reissue; digipak; different cover |
| 2009 | Metal Mind Productions | CD | Poland | No | CD reissue; remastered; digipack, bonus track |
