= Spalam się =

Studio album by Kazik
- Released: 11 November 1991
- Recorded: 1991
- Genre: Hip hop, Rock
- Length: 61:28
- Label: Zic Zac
- Producer: Wojciech Przybylski

Kazik chronology
Spalam się (1991)	Spalaj się! (1993)

Spalam się is the first solo studio album of Polish musician Kazik. It is the first hip hop style album in Polish rock music history. It was released on CD and compact cassette.

== Songs ==
No.	Title	Length
1.	"Nowy Konflikt Światowy"	4:51
2.	"Dziewczyny"	3:37
3.	"Piosenka Trepa"	4:21
4.	"Cyrk"	3:35
5.	"Temat Z Filmu "Bagaż Nielegalny""	6:24
6.	"Bagdad"	4:04
7.	"Spalam Się"	3:50
8.	"Świadomość"	4:30
9.	"Oblężenie"	3:02
10.	"Jeszcze Polska..."	5:02
11.	"Dziewczyny [Ciężka Wersja]" (CD only release)	3:39
12.	"Nie Mogę Istnieć Bez Narzekania" (CD only release)	7:12
13.	"Spalam Się [Długa Wersja]" (CD only release)	6:52

== Credits ==
- Kazik Staszewski – Voices, Sampler, saxophone
- Jacek Kufirski – Keyboard, Strings, Sampler, Bass, Drum Programming, Voices
- Piotr "Shpenyagah" Strembicki – Keyboards, Sampler, Strings, Conga, Voices, Drum Programming
- Wojciech Przybylski (record producer) – Recordings, Sampler, Voice
- Wojciech Waglewski – Guitar
- Jacek Rodziewicz – Saxophone
- Paweł Betley – Piano
- Marek Surzyn – Voice
