= High Proof Cosmic Milk =

Studio album by Acid Drinkers
- Released: 18 March 1998 (Poland)
- Recorded: January 1998 at Deo Recordings Studio, Wisła
- Genre: Thrash metal, groove metal
- Length: 44:43
- Label: Metal Mind Productions
- Producer: Acid Drinkers

Acid Drinkers chronology
The State of Mind Report (1996)	High Proof Cosmic Milk (1998)	Amazing Atomic Activity (1999)

High Proof Cosmic Milk is the seventh studio album by Polish thrash metal band Acid Drinkers. It was released on 18 March 1998 in Poland through Metal Mind Productions. The album was recorded in January 1998 at Deo Recordings Studio in Wisła. The cover art was created by Litza and Jacek Gulczyński and fotos by Andrzej Kurczak. High Proof Cosmic Milk is the last album recorded with Litza.

== Track listing ==
No.	Title	Length
1.	"Rattlesnake Blues"	4:07
2.	"Human Bazooka"	4:33
3.	"High Proof Cosmic Milk"	5:09
4.	"What's Happenin' in the Heart of Pacyfist"	3:53
5.	"More Life"	4:28
6.	"Be My Godzilla"	3:37
7.	"Dementia Blvd."	5:58
8.	"Blind Leadin' the Blind"	4:00
9.	"Gain on Shit"	3:56
10.	"Proud Mary" (Creedance Clearwater Revival cover)	5:02

=== Bonus tracks ===
No.	Title	Length
11.	"Sad Like a Coal Check"	3:41
12.	"Blind Leadin' the Blind" (Demo version)	3:20
13.	"Blustery Nite Tour"	-

== Personnel ==
- Tomasz "Titus" Pukacki – vocals, bass
- Robert "Litza" Friedrich – backing vocals, guitar
- Dariusz "Popcorn" Popowicz – guitar
- Maciej "Ślimak" Starosta – drums
- Lori Wallett – backing vocals
- Music – Acid Drinkers
- Mastering – Grzegorz Piwkowski
- Engineered – Adam Toczko, Jacek Chraplak

== Release history ==
Year	Label	Format	Country	Out of print?	Notes
1998	Metal Mind Productions	CD, LP, digipak	Poland	Yes	Original CD and LP (white vinyl) release; bonus tracks in digipak release
2009	Metal Mind Productions	CD	Poland	No	CD reissue; remastered; digipak; bonus track
