= Vile Vicious Vision =

Studio album by Acid Drinkers
- Released: October, 1993 (Poland)
- Recorded: June 5–16, 1993 at HELLENIC Studio, Poznań
- Genre: Thrash metal
- Length: 46:04
- Label: Loud Out Records, Metal Mind Productions
- Producer: Acid Drinkers

Acid Drinkers chronology
Strip Tease (1992)	Vile Vicious Vision (1993)	Fishdick (1994)

Vile Vicious Vision is the fourth studio album by Polish thrash metal band Acid Drinkers. It was released in October 1993 in Poland through Loud Out Records. The album was recorded from 5 to 16 June 1993 at HELLENIC Studio, Poznań. The cover art was created by Mariusz Łechtański and Litza and photos by Lech Brzoza and Magda Starosta.

== Track listing ==
No.	Title	Length
1.	"Zero"	3:31
2.	"(Voluntary) Kamikaze Club"	3:34
3.	"Vile Vicious Vision"	4:00
4.	"Pizza Driver"	4:25
5.	"Under the Gun"	3:37
6.	"Marian Is a Metal Guru"	3:01
7.	"Murzyn Mariusz"	3:54
8.	"Balbinator Edzy"	3:25
9.	"Then She Kissed Me" (The Crystals cover)	2:46
10.	"Hats Off (2 This Lady)"	4:03
11.	"Polish Blood"	3:09
12.	"You Freeze Me"	3:30
13.	"Midnight Visitor"	3:09

=== Bonus Tracks ===
No.	Title	Length
14.	"Pizza Driver (live)"	4:37

== Personnel ==
- Tomasz "Titus" Pukacki - vocal, bass guitar
- Robert "Litza" Friedrich - backing vocal, guitar, lead vocal on track 5
- Dariusz "Popcorn" Popowicz - guitar, vocals on track 9 and 11
- Maciej "Ślimak" Starosta - drums, vocal on track 13
- Music and lyrics - Acid Drinkers (except "Then She Kissed Me": Jeff Barry, Ellie Greenwich, Philip Spector)
- Engineered - Piotr Madziar
- Mixed - Piotr Madziar and Litza

== Release history ==
Year	Label	Format	Country	Out of Print?	Notes
1993	Loud Out Records	CD	Poland	Yes	Original CD release
1997	Metal Mind Productions	CD	Poland	Yes	CD reissue
2009	Metal Mind Productions	CD	Poland	No	CD reissue; remastered; digipack, bonus track
