= Are You a Rebel? =

Studio album by Acid Drinkers
- Released: 9 September 1990 (England), April 1991 (Poland)
- Recorded: March 1990
- Studio: Giełda Studio, Poznań, Poland
- Genre: Thrash metal, crossover thrash
- Length: 43:26
- Label: Under One Flag, Polskie Nagrania "Muza", Metal Mind Productions
- Producer: Acid Drinkers

Acid Drinkers chronology
Are You a Rebel? (1990)	Dirty Money, Dirty Tricks (1991)

Are You a Rebel? is the debut studio album by a Polish thrash metal band Acid Drinkers. It is also the first album by a polish metal band to be released on CD. The recording lasted for 13 days and was done in Studio Giełda, Poznań. The first release of the album was made by an English label Under One Flag Records, and wasn't distributed in Poland until April 1991, when Polskie Nagrania "Muza" decided to put it out.

The first track on Are You a Rebel? is one of the oldest songs created by the band. Its lyrics are about Titus's friend from Army. The album is also full of band's typical humour, a great example of which is the song Woman with the Dirty Feet. Nevertheless, the most well known tracks from this release are definitely Barmy Army, I Am the Mystic and I Fuck the Violence which are played live even to these days.

== Track listing ==
No.	Title	Length
1.	"Del Rocca"	2:59
2.	"Barmy Army"	5:22
3.	"I Mean Acid (Do Ya Like It?)"	4:38
4.	"Waitin' for the Hair"	3:41
5.	"Lammin', Obtrusive, Vulgar, Emasculin' Machine"	2:40
6.	"I Fuck the Violence (I'm Sure I'm Right)"	2:48
7.	"I Am the Mystic"	3:26
8.	"Woman with the Dirty Feet"	2:50
9.	"Megalopolis"	4:32
10.	"Nagasaki Baby"	4:50
11.	"Moshin' in the Nite"	3:33
12.	"Mike Cwel"	2:07

=== Bonus tracks ===
No.	Title	Length
13.	"Fuck Me (live)"	3:55
14.	"Del Rocca (demo)"	2:49
15.	"Nagasaki Baby (demo)"	4:29
16.	"I Mean Acid / Do Ya Like It? (demo)"	4:46
17.	"Running with the Devil (live)"	2:39
18.	"Konsument (live)"	2:30
19.	"Ok, I Feel All Right (live)"	1:46
20.	"3 wojna (live)"	4:04

== Personnel ==
- Tomasz "Titus" Pukacki – vocals, bass
- Robert "Litza" Friedrich – backing vocals, guitar
- Dariusz "Popcorn" Popowicz – guitar
- Maciej "Ślimak" Starosta – drums
- Music – Acid Drinkers
- Engineered – Piotr Madziar
- Kompas – vocal on track 8

== Release history ==
Date	Label	Format	Country	Out of print?	Notes
9 September 1990	Under One Flag	CD, LP	England	Yes	Original CD and LP release
April 1991	Polskie Nagrania "Muza"	CD, LP	Poland	Yes	CD and LP reissue
1994	Metal Mind Productions	CD	Poland	Yes	CD reissue
2009	Metal Mind Productions	CD	Poland	No	CD reissue; remastered; digipack; bonus tracks
