= The State of Mind Report =

Studio album by Acid Drinkers
- Released: 22 April 1996 (Poland)
- Recorded: 22 January – 9 February 1996
- Studio: Deo Recordings Studio, Wisła
- Genre: Thrash metal
- Length: 46:50
- Label: Polton/Warner Music Poland, Metal Mind Productions
- Producer: Acid Drinkers

Acid Drinkers chronology
Infernal Connection (1994)	The State of Mind Report (1996)	High Proof Cosmic Milk (1998)

The State of Mind Report is the sixth studio album by Polish thrash metal band Acid Drinkers. It was released on 22 April 1996 in Poland through Polton and Warner Music Poland. The album was recorded from 22 January to 9 February 1996 at Deo Recordings Studio in Wisła and was mixed at Buffo Studio in Warsaw. The cover art was created by Litza, Ewa Ludmiła Fedan, Zygmunt Tomala, Paweł Nowicki and fotos by Piotr Stańczak.

== Track listing ==
No.	Title	Length
1.	"Private Eco"	3:25
2.	"Two Be One"	4:20
3.	"24 Radical Questions"	4:20
4.	"Solid Rock"	5:12
5.	"United Suicide Legion"	6:03
6.	"Pump the Plastic Heart"	5:32
7.	"Maximum Overload"	4:29
8.	"Solid Rock Part II"	4:37
9.	"Wild Thing" (The Troggs cover)	2:59
10.	"Walkway to Heaven"	5:53

=== Bonus tracks ===
No.	Title	Length
11.	"Slow & Stoned (Method of Yonash) – Bonarowski Mix Gitarowy"	3:39
12.	"Slow & Stoned (Method of Yonash) – Hrohomyloh Mix"	3:46
13.	"Slow & Stoned (Method of Yonash) – Versya Spoko"	4:29

== Personnel ==
- Tomasz "Titus" Pukacki – vocals, bass, guitar on track 9
- Robert "Litza" Friedrich – backing vocals, guitar, lead vocal on track 4, 8
- Dariusz "Popcorn" Popowicz – guitar
- Maciej "Ślimak" Starosta – drums, backing vocals
- Music and lyrics – Acid Drinkers (expect "Wild Thing": Chip Taylor and "Walkway to Heaven": Litza, Marcin Pospieszalski)
- Engineered – Adam Toczko, Tomasz Bonarowski
- Mastering – Grzegorz Piwkowski
- Lori Wallett – vocal on track 10
- Steve Wallett – additional vocal on track 10
- Tomasz Budzyński (Armia) – additional vocal on track 8
- Darek Malejonek (Houk) – additional vocal on track 8
- Dariusz Cichor – additional vocal on track 8
- Dziki – additional vocal on track 8
- Jacek – additional vocal on track 8
- The Stawski Orchestra track 10
- Michał Kulenty – flue on track 10
- Marcin Pospieszalski – bass and violins on track 10

== Release history ==
Year	Label	Format	Country	Out of print?	Notes
1996	Polton, Warner Music Poland	CD	Poland	Yes	Original CD and LP release
1998	Metal Mind Productions	CD	Poland	Yes	CD reissue; bonus tracks
2009	Metal Mind Productions	CD	Poland	No	CD reissue; remastered; digipak
