= Czterdziesty pierwszy =

Studio album by Kazik
- Released: October 1, 2004
- Studio: SP
- Genres: Hip hop, alternative rock
- Length: 149:00
- Label: S.P. Records
- Producer: Kajetan Aroń

Kazik chronology
Melassa (2000)	Czterdziesty pierwszy (2004)	Los się musi odmienić (2005)

Czterdzisty pierwszy is an album by Kazik, released on October 1, 2004 through S.P. Records.

== Track listing ==
All tracks are written by Kazik Staszewski, except where noted

CD One - Czterdziesty Pierwszy Pierwszy
No.	Title	Writer(s)	Length
1.	"Stalingrad (Adam Und Klara)"		12:20
2.	"Bomba"	Kazik Staszewski, Krzysztof Skowron, Tadeusz Bagan	5:57
3.	"Idol"		5:25
4.	"Maria"		5:10
5.	"Down In The Another Hole"	Andrzej Izdebski, Kazik Staszewski	4:37
6.	"Pani Katarzyna"		7:14
7.	"Zielone Karty"	Dariusz Szurlej	4:44
8.	"Anarchia W WC"		5:11
9.	"Czego Zechcesz Synu, Gdy Wszystkiego Masz Już W Bród?"		6:08
10.	"Nasza Kompania"		5:23
11.	"Sfizohremja"		6:35
12.	"Dzisiaj Przyjeżdża Krysia"		3:41

CD Two - Czterdziesty Pierwszy Drugi
No.	Title	Writer(s)	Length
1.	"Kryzys Energetyczny"		6:32
2.	"George W. Bush Kocha Polskę"		9:06
3.	"Tortury"	Kazik Staszewski, Olaf Deriglasoff	6:00
4.	"Chopie, Nie Szalej!"		6:41
5.	"Czasem Mi Się Zdaje"		7:08
6.	"Lili Marleen"	Hans Leip, Norbert Schultze	5:19
7.	"Dzisiejszy Styl"		6:16
8.	"Proces Bandy Gorfryda"		4:51
9.	"Paraliż!"		6:45
10.	"Na Lewo Most, Na Prawo Most"		5:10
11.	"Polska Płonie"		3:15
12.	"40 Lat Minęło"	Jan Tadeusz Stanisławski, Jerzy Matuszkiewicz	9:22

== Personnel ==
- Kazik Staszewski – vocals, sampler, saxophone, bass guitar
- Janusz Zdunek – trumpet
- Tomasz Glazik – saxophone
- Jacek Majewski – percussion
- Wojciech Jabłoński – percussion, guitar
- Andrzej Izdebski – guitar, vocals
- Krzysztof Banasik – french horn
- Olaf Deriglasoff – bass guitar, guitar, keyboards, vocals
- Gonya Deriglasoff – artwork
