= Tomasz Dziubiński =

Polish footballer

Tomasz Dziubinski
Personal information
- Date of birth: 8 July 1968 (age 58)
- Place of birth: Radom, Poland
- Height: 1.76 m (5 ft 9 in)
- Position: Striker

Senior career*
Years	Team	Apps	(Gls)
1976–1988	Broń Radom		
1989–1991	Wisła Kraków	62	(30)
1991–1994	Club Brugge	48	(11)
1994–1995	RWD Molenbeek	12	(1)
1995–1996	Le Mans UC72	12	(1)
1996–1997	Verbroedering Geel	13	(2)
1997–1999	Mazowsze Grójec		

International career
1991–1993	Poland	2	(0)

Managerial career
- 2008–2009: Iłżanka Kazanów
- 2010: Zorza Kowala
- 2012: LKS Promna
- 2013–2015: Broń Radom
- 2015–2023: Jodła Jedlnia-Letnisko
- * Club domestic league appearances and goals

Tomasz Dziubinski (born 8 July 1968) is a Polish football manager and former professional player. He currently works as a coach for Jodła Jedlnia-Letnisko's youth teams.

== Career ==
Dziubinski started his senior career with Broń Radom. In 1989, he signed for Wisła Kraków in the Polish Ekstraklasa, where he made sixty-two league appearances and scored thirty goals. After that, he played for Club Brugge, RWD Molenbeek, Le Mans, Verbroedering Geel, and Mazowsze Grójec.

== Honours ==
Club Brugge

- Belgian First Division: 1991–92
- Belgian Super Cup: 1992

Individual

- Ekstraklasa top scorer: 1990–91
