= Kult (band) =

Polish rock band

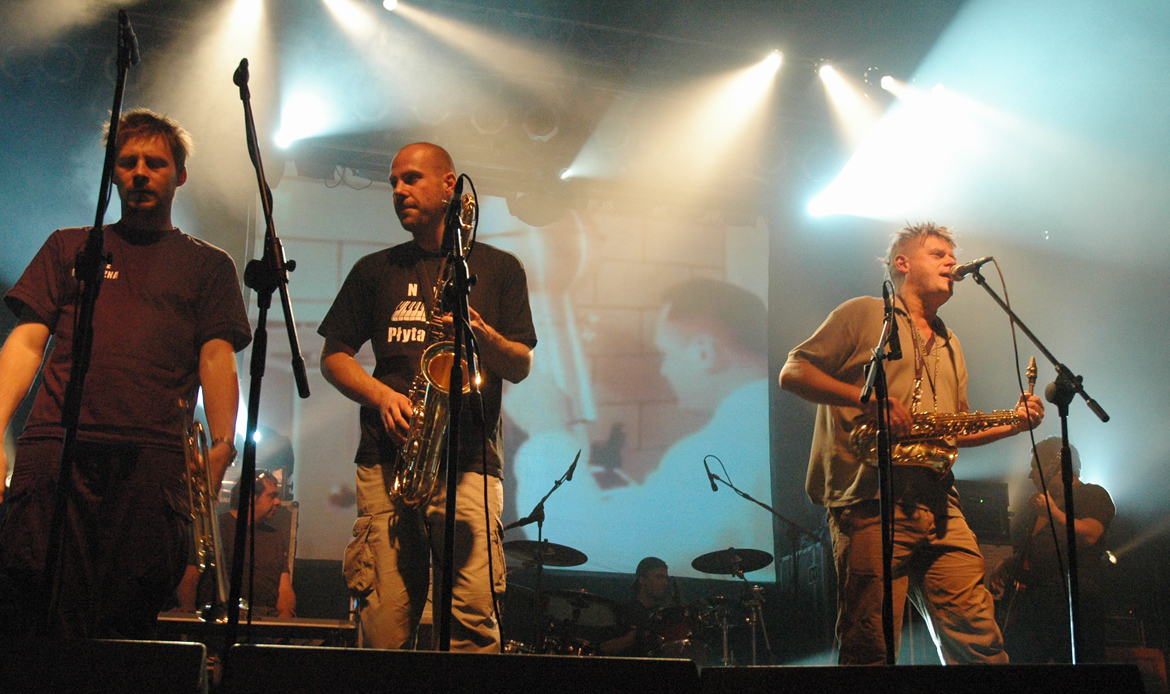
- Kult performing live in Warsaw, 2005

Background information
- Origin: Warsaw, Poland
- Genres: Punk rock, rock, alternative rock, new wave, psychedelic rock, post-punk, jazz, hard rock
- Years active: 1982–present
- Label: S.P. Records
- Members: Kazik Staszewski; Jarosław Ważny; Wojciech Jabłoński; Ireneusz Wereński; Janusz Zdunek; Tomasz Goehs; Mariusz Godzina; Konrad Wantrych
- Website: kult.art.pl (in Polish)

Kult is a Polish rock band formed in 1982 in Warsaw.

Kult's early works were strongly influenced by alternative, progressive and punk rock, as well as the British new wave, but the band gradually incorporated more diverse and innovative styles in their music. The music of the band is primarily associated with strong lyrics by Staszewski and distinct wind section. From the start, the group has had an instantly recognizable sound and is distinguished by the voice and provocative lyrics of the lead singer, Kazik Staszewski.

Kult became famous for the atmosphere they created at their concerts and the unorthodox message in their songs. Kult's songs attack 'the system', understood as a conglomerate of the communist state apparatus, the Catholic Church, and others. In the nineties Kult took on the 'new system', which was seen as founded on pseudo-democratic leaders, the clergy and corporations.

== History ==
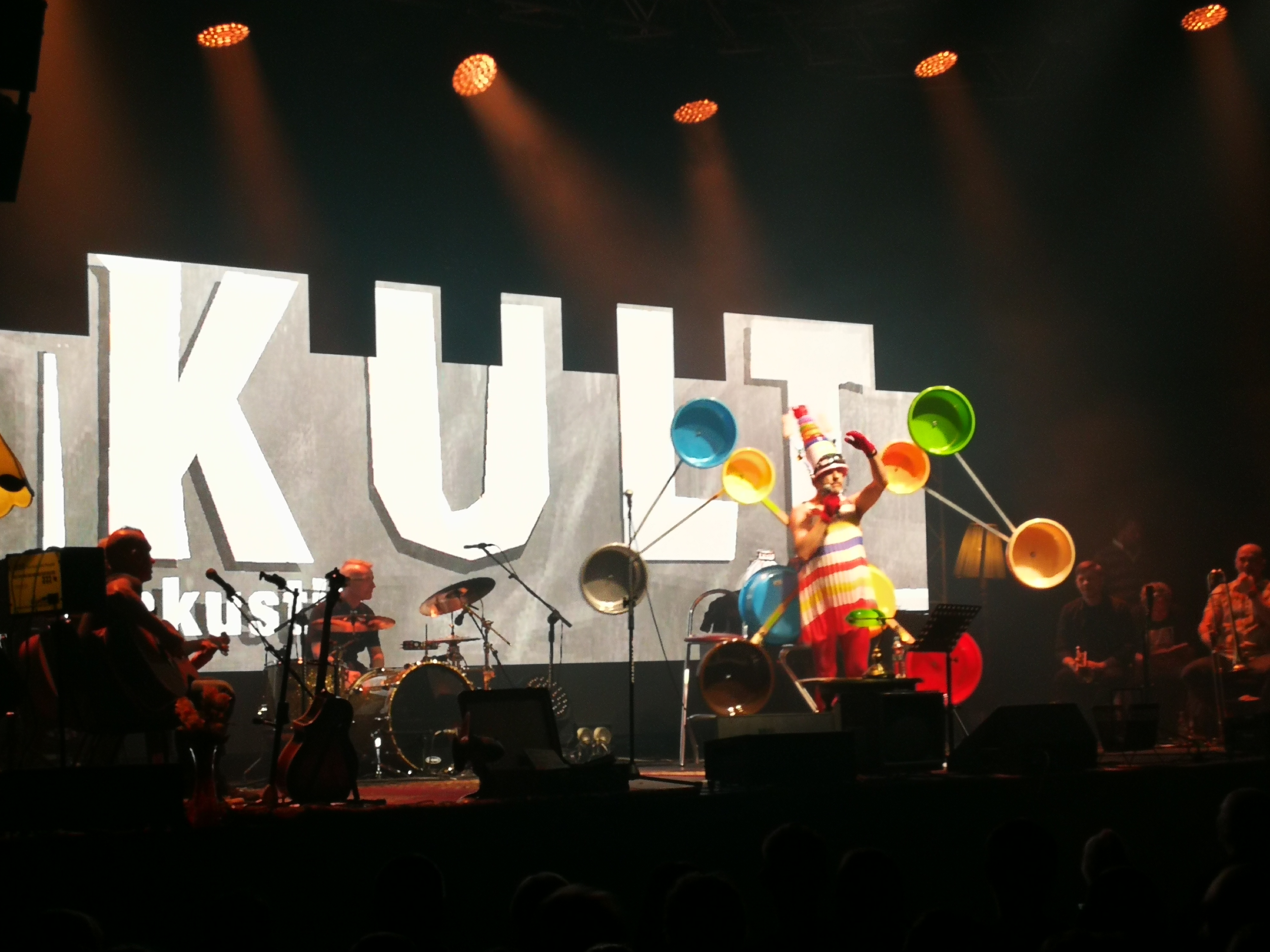
Mirosław Jędras performing with Kult in 2019

Before forming the band, all members of the original quartet had been playing together in either Poland or Novelty Poland, two bands led by Staszewski between 1979 and 1981. In July 1982 the band performed at its first concert at the Remont Club in Warsaw. The first concert of the new band in July 1982 sold only 14 tickets. However, in 1986 the band recorded its first album (named eponymously "Kult"; released the following year), which attracted much attention and included early punk-inspired hits "Krew Boga", "O Ani" and "Wspaniała nowina". Initially the censorship office did not allow for release of many songs by Staszewski, clearly aimed against "the system". Also in 1987 a second album, the slightly more psychedelic "Posłuchaj to do Ciebie" was released. Since then the band gained much popularity in Poland, with songs such as "Do Ani", "Arahja" and "Krew Boga" reaching #1 on Polish Radio 3 chart (LP3).

After 1989 and the end of Communist rule in Poland Kult enjoyed great success, with each of a series of albums bringing new hits to the tops of the radio charts. The "Generał Ferreira / Rząd oficjalny" from the 1991 album "Your Eyes" reached No. 1 on LP3 and stayed in the Top20 for 33 consecutive weeks. "Dziewczyna bez zęba na przedzie", "Komu bije dzwon", "Gdy nie ma dzieci" and "Lewy czerwcowy" (from the 1998 album "Ostateczny krach systemu korporacji") all reached No. 1 and stayed in the Top20 for 37, 38, 30 and 23 weeks, respectively. In addition, "Gdy nie ma dzieci" spent 9 weeks at #1, a former record among Polish artists, surpassed by Artur Rojek's "Syreny" in 2014.

Although the post-2000 albums by Kult enjoyed less popularity, Kult remains one of the best-known Polish musical groups. The band released a total of 17 studio albums and five live albums, including the 2010 recording of a MTV Unplugged concert.

== Members ==
The original members of Kult were:

- Tadeusz Bagan (1982) – guitar
- Dariusz "Misiek" Gierszewski (1982) – drums
- Kazik Staszewski (1982–present) – vocals, saxophone
- Piotr Wieteska (1982–1986) – bass

The band's lineup changed over the years. As of 2025, Kult consists of:

- Tomasz Goehs (1998–present) – drums
- Wojciech Jabłoński (2008–present) – guitar
- Kazik Staszewski (1982–present) – vocals, saxophone
- Jarosław Ważny (2008–present) – trombone
- Irek "Jeżyk" Wereński (1986–present) – bass
- Janusz Zdunek (1998–present) – trumpet
- Mariusz Godzina (2020–present) – saxophone
- Konrad Wantrych (2020–present) – keyboards

The other former members are:

- Janusz Grudziński (1982–1998; 1999–2023) – keyboards, guitar, cello and vibraphone
- Piotr Morawiec (1982–1983; 1987–1988; 1989–2024) – guitar
- Tomasz Glazik (2003–2020) – tenor and baritone saxophone
- Rafał Kwaśniewski (1988–1989) – guitar
- Krzysztof Banasik (1988–2008) – french horn, trumpet, guitar, keyboards, squeezebox and sitar

(List is not complete)

== Discography ==
=== Studio albums ===
Title	Album details	Peak chart positions	Sales	Certifications
Title	Album details	POL	Sales	Certifications
Kult	Released: May 1987; Label: Polton, S.P. Records; Formats: LP, CD, CS, digital download	—		
Posłuchaj to do ciebie	Released: October 1987; Label: Klub Płytowy Razem, S.P. Records; Formats: LP, CD, CS, digital download	—		
Spokojnie	Released: December 1988; Label: Polton, S.P. Records; Formats: LP, CD, CS, digital download	—		
Kaseta	Released: 1989; Label: Polton, S.P. Records; Formats: LP, CD, CS, digital download	—		
45-89	Released: February 1991; Label: Arston, Bogdan Studio, S.P. Records; Formats: LP, CD, CS, digital download	—		
Your Eyes	Released: September 1991; Label: Zic Zac, S.P. Records; Formats: LP, CD, CS, digital download	—		
Tata Kazika	Released: April 1993; Label: S.P. Records; Formats: LP, CD, CS, digital download	—		POL: Gold
Muj wydafca	Released: 1 October 1994; Label: S.P. Records; Formats: LP, CD, CS, digital download	—		
Tata 2	Released: 1 March 1996; Label: S.P. Records; Formats: LP, CD, CS, digital download	—		
Ostateczny krach systemu korporacji	Released: 4 May 1998; Label: S.P. Records; Formats: LP, CD, CS, digital download	—		POL: Gold
Salon Recreativo	Released: 1 October 2001; Label: S.P. Records; Formats: LP, CD, CS, digital download	1		
Poligono Industrial	Released: 5 December 2005; Label: S.P. Records; Formats: CD, CD+DVD, digital download	1	POL: 35,000+	POL: Gold
Hurra!	Released: 28 September 2009; Label: S.P. Records; Formats: LP, CD, digital download	1	POL: 30,000+	POL: Platinum
Prosto	Released: 13 May 2013; Label: S.P. Records; Formats: LP, CD, digital download	1	POL: 40,000+	POL: Platinum
Wstyd	Released: 14 October 2016; Label: S.P. Records	1		POL: Platinum
Wstyd. Suplement 2016	Released: 2 December 2016; Label: S.P. Records	16		
Ostatnia płyta	Released: 28 May 2021; Label: S.P. Records	1		
"—" denotes a recording that did not chart or was not released in that territory.

=== Live albums ===
Title	Album details	Peak chart positions	Sales	Certifications
Title	Album details	POL	Sales	Certifications
Tan	Released: 1989; Label: Arston, S.P. Records; Formats: LP, CD, CS, digital download	—		
MTV Unplugged	Released: 22 November 2010; Label: S.P. Records; Formats: CD, CD+DVD, DVD, LP, Blu-ray	1	POL: 150,000+	POL: Diamond
Made in Poland	Released: 8 September 2017; Label: S.P. Records	2		
Made in Poland II	Released: 15 December 2017; Label: S.P. Records	44		
Live Pol’and’Rock Festival 2019	Released: 6 November 2020; Label: S.P. Records	1		POL: Platinum
"—" denotes a recording that did not chart or was not released in that territory.
