= Kazik Staszewski =

Polish singer and songwriter

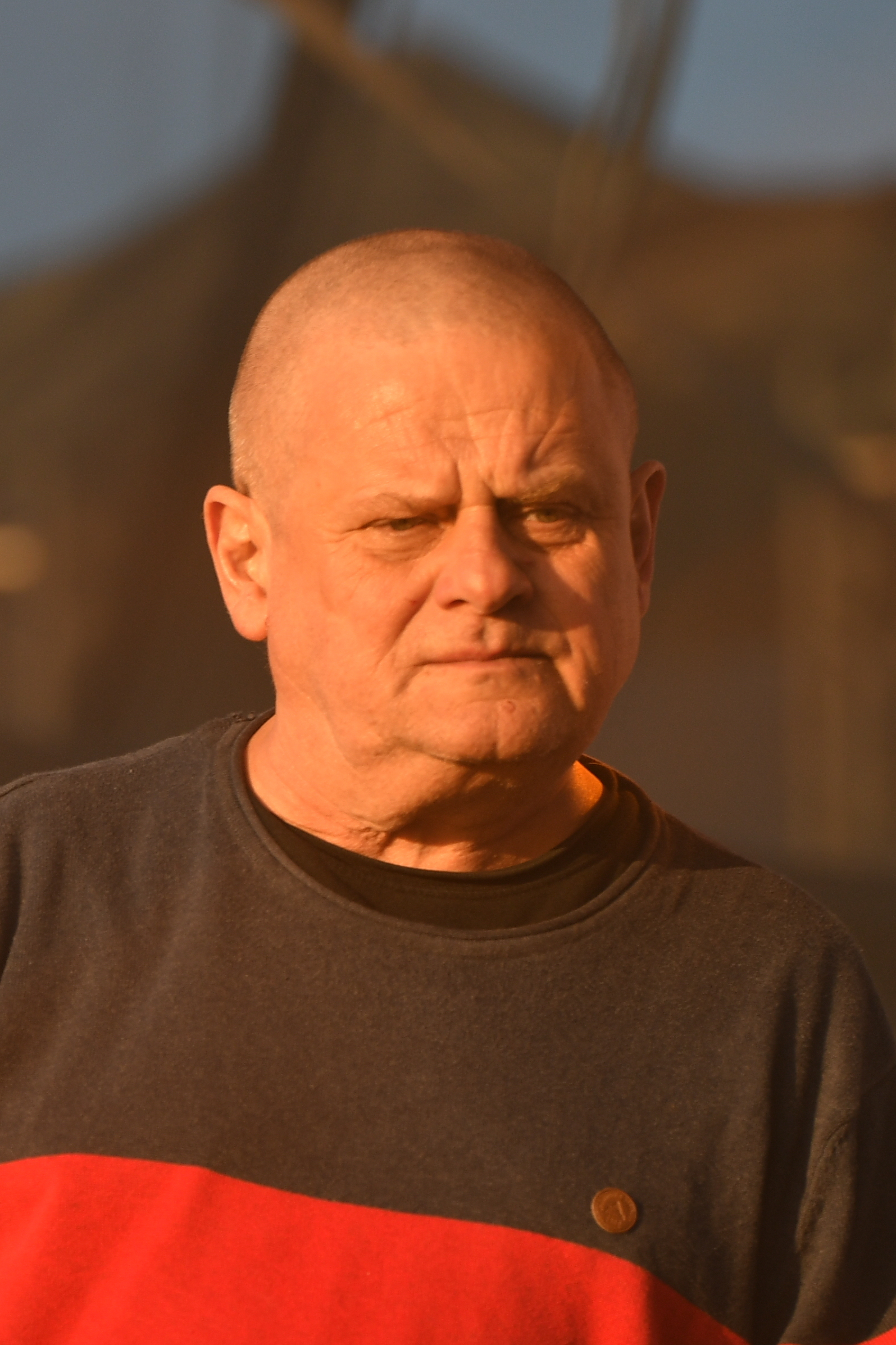
- Staszewski performing with Kult in Wrocław, 2023
- Born: Kazimierz Piotr Staszewski; 12 March 1963 (age 63); Warsaw, Poland
- Occupations: Musician, singer-songwriter, producer
- Spouse: Anna Staszewska
- Children: Jan Staszewski; Kazimierz Staszewski
- Parent(s): Stanisław Staszewski; Krystyna Staszewska
- Musical career
- Also known as: Kazik
- Genres: Rock, alternative rock, punk rock, rap, rapcore, folk rock, yass, experimental rock
- Instruments: Vocals, saxophones, sampler, synthesizer, guitar, bass guitar
- Years active: 1979–present
- Label: S.P. Records
- Website: kazik.pl

Kazimierz Piotr Staszewski (born 12 March 1963), also known as Kazik, is a Polish singer and songwriter. He is the son of the architect and poet Stanisław Staszewski. He is the frontman and sole original member of the rock band Kult, which he founded in 1982; their latest album, Ostatnia Płyta, was released in 2021. In 1991, he launched a solo career with one of the first Polish rap albums, Spalam się.

Staszewski was also a member of other bands (El Dupa, Buldog, Zuch Kazik, Kazik na Żywo). He continues to work with Kwartet ProForma.

== Personal life ==
Staszewski is the son of Stanisław Staszewski, a poet and architect, and Krystyna Staszewska (née Mojkowska), a construction technician.

Staszewski stated that he voted for Karol Nawrocki in the second round of the 2025 Polish presidential election, saying that his decision was the choice of the "lesser evil".

== Discography ==
=== Studio albums ===
Title	Album details	Peak chart positions	Sales	Certifications
Title	Album details	POL	Sales	Certifications
Spalam się	Released: 11 November 1991; Label: Zic Zac; Formats: CD, compact cassette	–		
Spalaj się!	Released: 6 April 1993; Label: Eska; Formats: CD	–		
Oddalenie	Released: 29 May 1995; Label: S.P. Records; Formats: CD, digital download	–		
12 Groszy	Released: 6 June 1997; Label: S.P. Records; Formats: CD, digital download	–	POL: 200,000+	POL: Platinum
Melassa	Released: 9 June 2000; Label: S.P. Records; Formats: CD, digital download	13		
Czterdziesty pierwszy	Released: 1 October 2004; Label: S.P. Records; Formats: CD, digital download	1		
Los się musi odmienić	Released: 6 June 2005; Label: S.P. Records; Formats: CD, digital download	1		
Silny Kazik pod wezwaniem	Released: 1 December 2008; Label: S.P. Records; Formats: CD, digital download	2	POL: 15,000+	POL: Gold
Wiwisekcja	Released: 27 March 2015; Label: S.P. Records	11		
Tata Kazika kontra Hedora	Released: 19 May 2017; Label: S.P. Records	2		
Zaraza	Released: 5 June 2020; Label: S.P. Records; Formats: CD, vinyl, compact cassette	1		POL: platinum
Po moim trupie	Released: 27 September 2024; Label: S.P. Records; Formats: CD, vinyl, compact cassette	1		
"—" denotes a recording that did not chart or was not released in that territory.

=== Cover albums ===
Title	Album details	Peak chart positions
Title	Album details	POL
Melodie Kurta Weill'a i coś ponadto	Released: 7 May 2001; Label: S.P. Records; Formats: CD	1
Piosenki Toma Waitsa	Released: 12 March 2003; Label: Luna Music; Formats: CD	2
"—" denotes a recording that did not chart or was not released in that territory.

== Bibliography ==
- Kazik Staszewski, Rafal Księżyk. Idę tam gdzie idę. Autobiografia. ISBN 9788394214012
