= Opalenica =

Town in Greater Poland Voivodeship, Poland

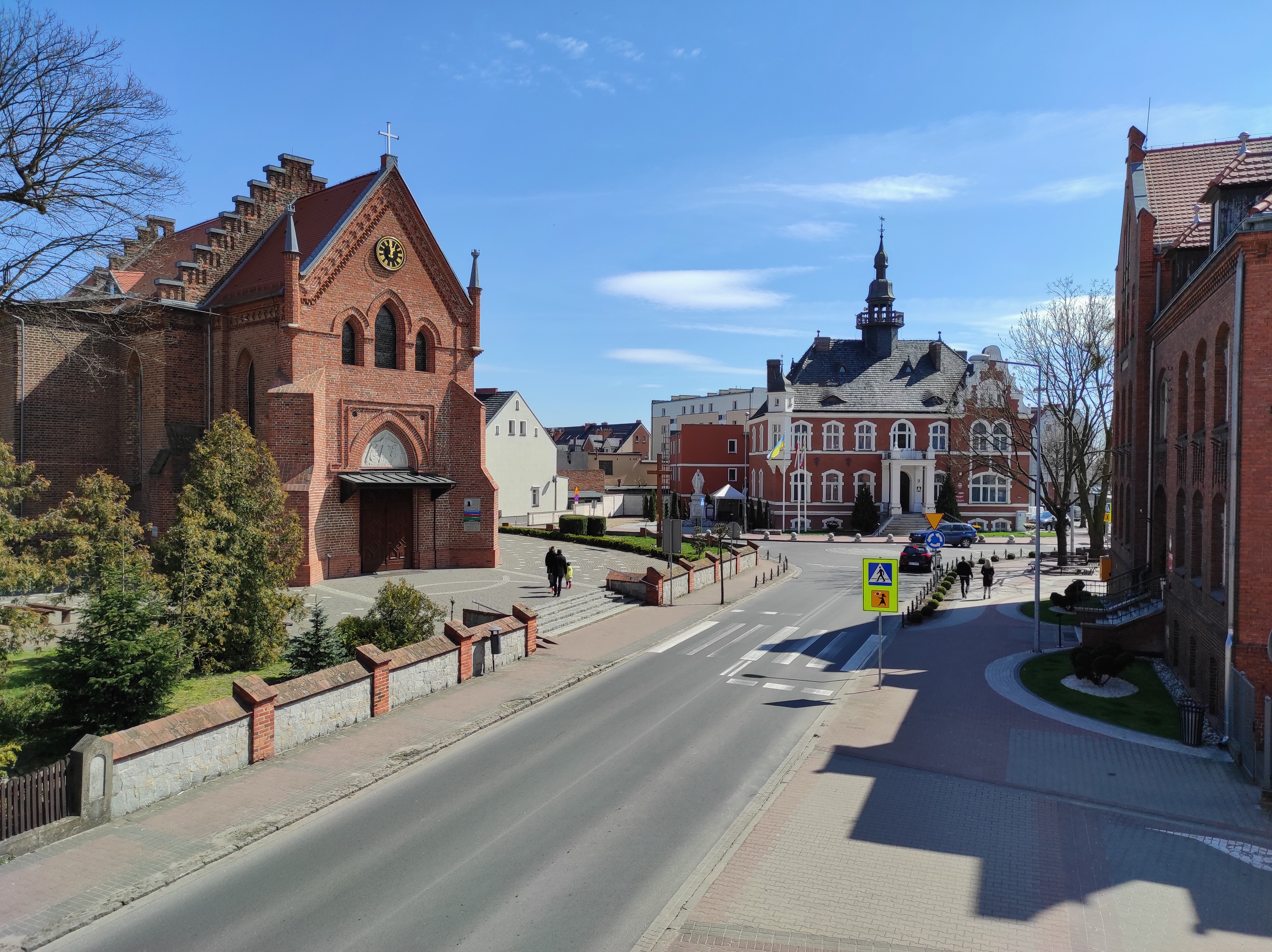
- Town center

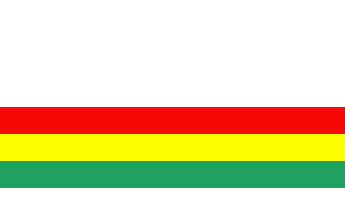
- Flag Coat of arms

- Location within Poland
- Coordinates: 52°18′28″N 16°24′49″E
- Country: Poland
- Voivodeship: Greater Poland
- County: Nowy Tomyśl
- Gmina: Opalenica

Area
  - Total: 6.42 km^{2} (2.48 sq mi)

Population (2024)
  - Total: 9,262
  - Density: 1,440/km^{2} (3,740/sq mi)
- Time zone: UTC+1 (CET)
  - Summer (DST): UTC+2 (CEST)
- Postal code: 64-330
- Vehicle registration: PNT

Opalenica [ɔpalɛˈɲit͡sa] is a town in Nowy Tomyśl County, Greater Poland Voivodeship, in western Poland, with 9,262 inhabitants (as of 2024).

== History ==
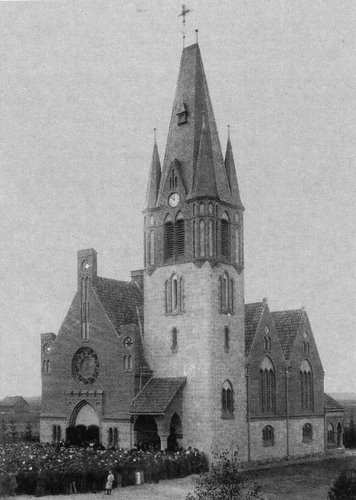
Saint Joseph church in c. 1945

The Opaliński noble family originated here as lords of the area and a branch of the Bniński family of Łodzia coat of arms. Opalenica was granted town rights in 1400. Opalenica was a private town, administratively located in the Kościan County in the Poznań Voivodeship in the Greater Poland Province of the Kingdom of Poland.

During the German occupation of Poland (World War II), the first expulsions of 183 Poles were carried out in December 1939. The Poles were sent to a transit camp in Młyniewo, and afterwards deported to the General Government in the more-eastern part of German-occupied Poland, while their houses, workshops, etc. were handed over to German colonists as part of the Lebensraum policy. The local Polish police chief, two further policemen, as well as a local pharmacist and a community activist were murdered by the Russians in the Katyn massacre in 1940. The Polish resistance was active in Opalenica. Heliodor Jankiewicz, commander of the local unit of the Narodowa Organizacja Bojowa organization, was arrested by the Germans in 1941, and then sentenced to death and executed the following year. In 1943, the occupiers renamed the town to Oppenbach in attempt to erase traces of Polish origin. In January 1945, a German-perpetrated death march of prisoners of various nationalities from the dissolved camp in Żabikowo to the Sachsenhausen concentration camp passed through the town.

There was a narrow-gauge railway in Opalenica, but it closed and was then dismantled to make way for the A2 motorway.

The Portugal National Football Team was based in Opalenica during the 2012 European Championships held in Poland and Ukraine.

== Gallery ==
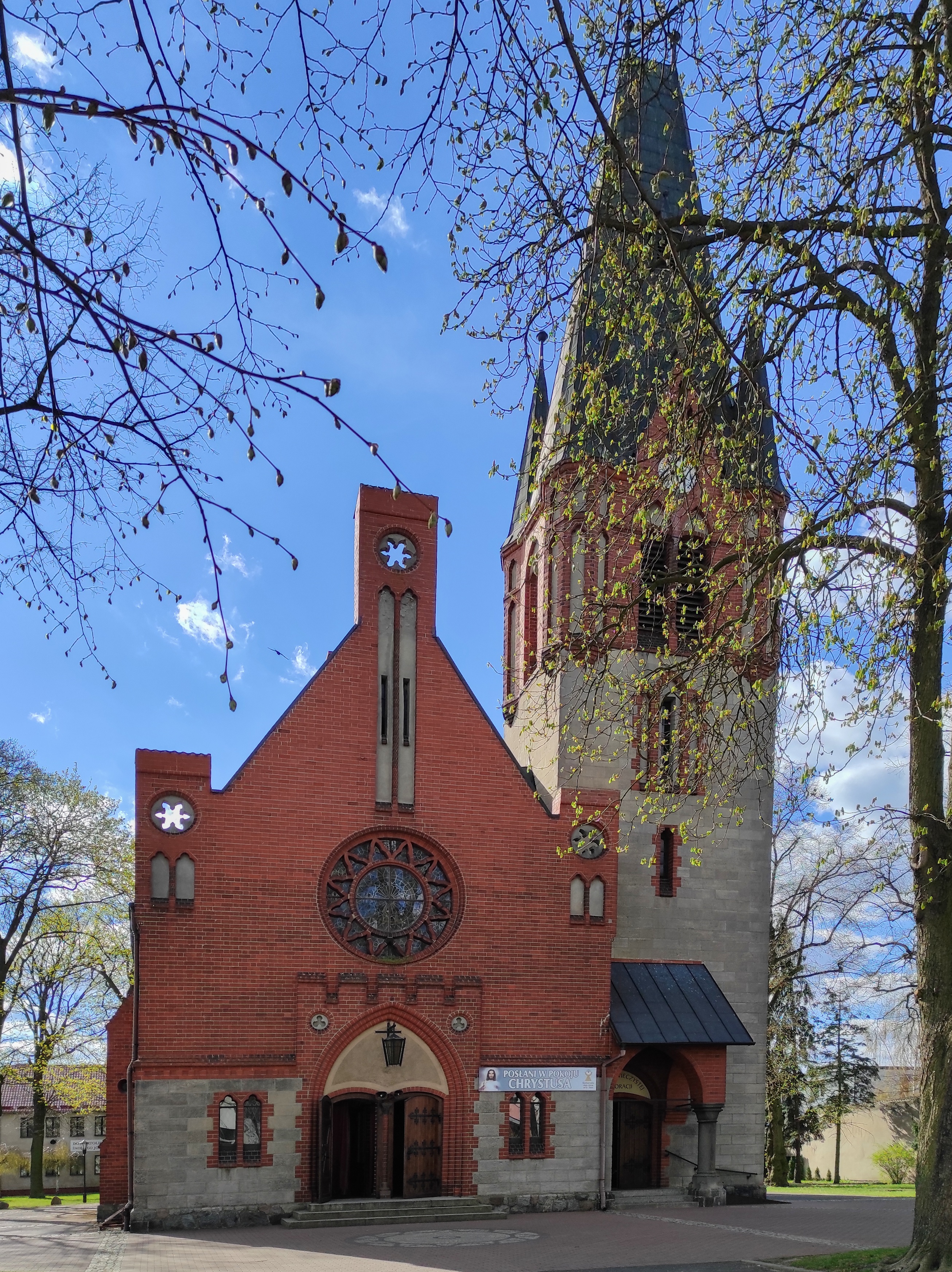
Saint Joseph church

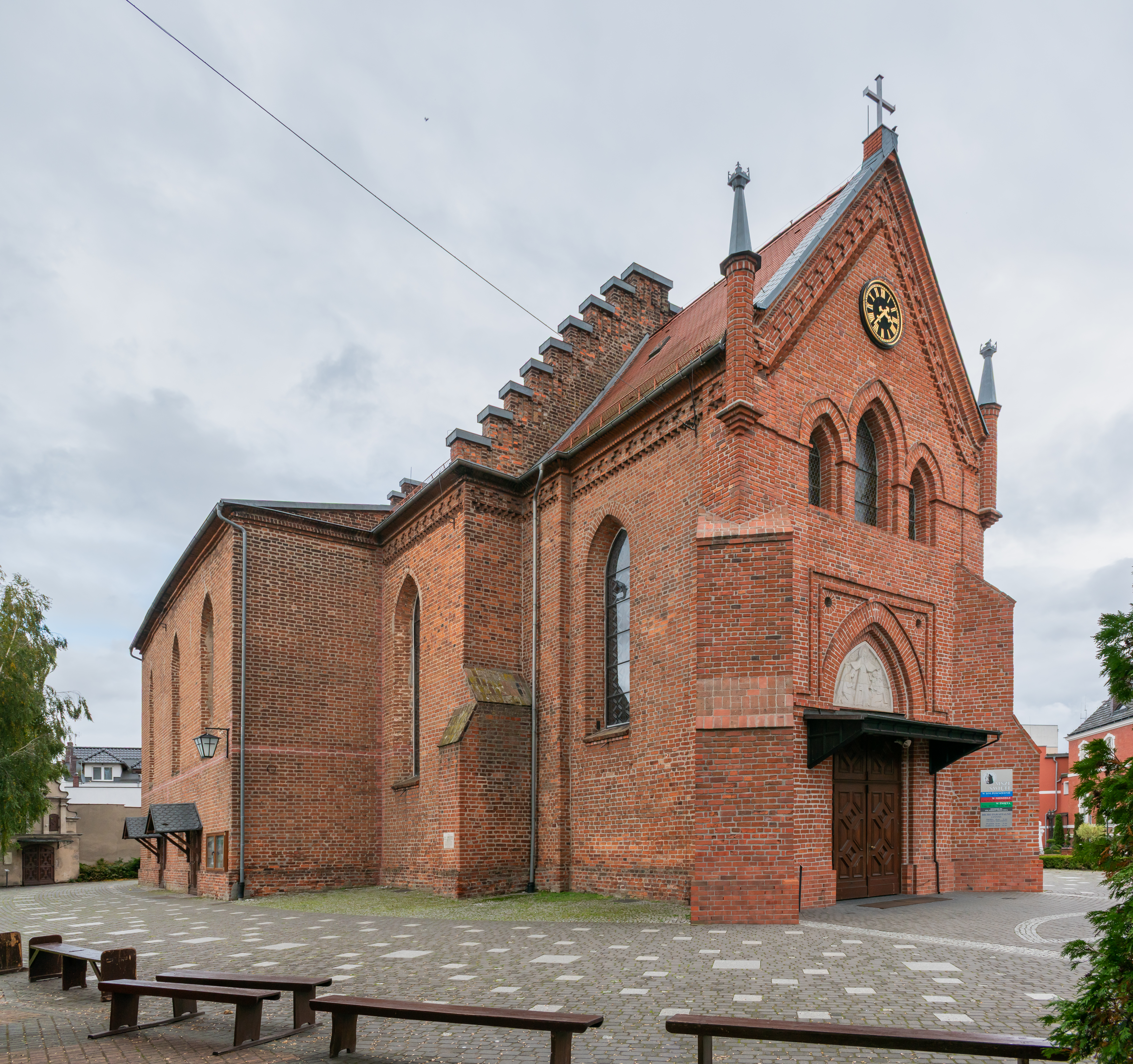
Saint Matthew church

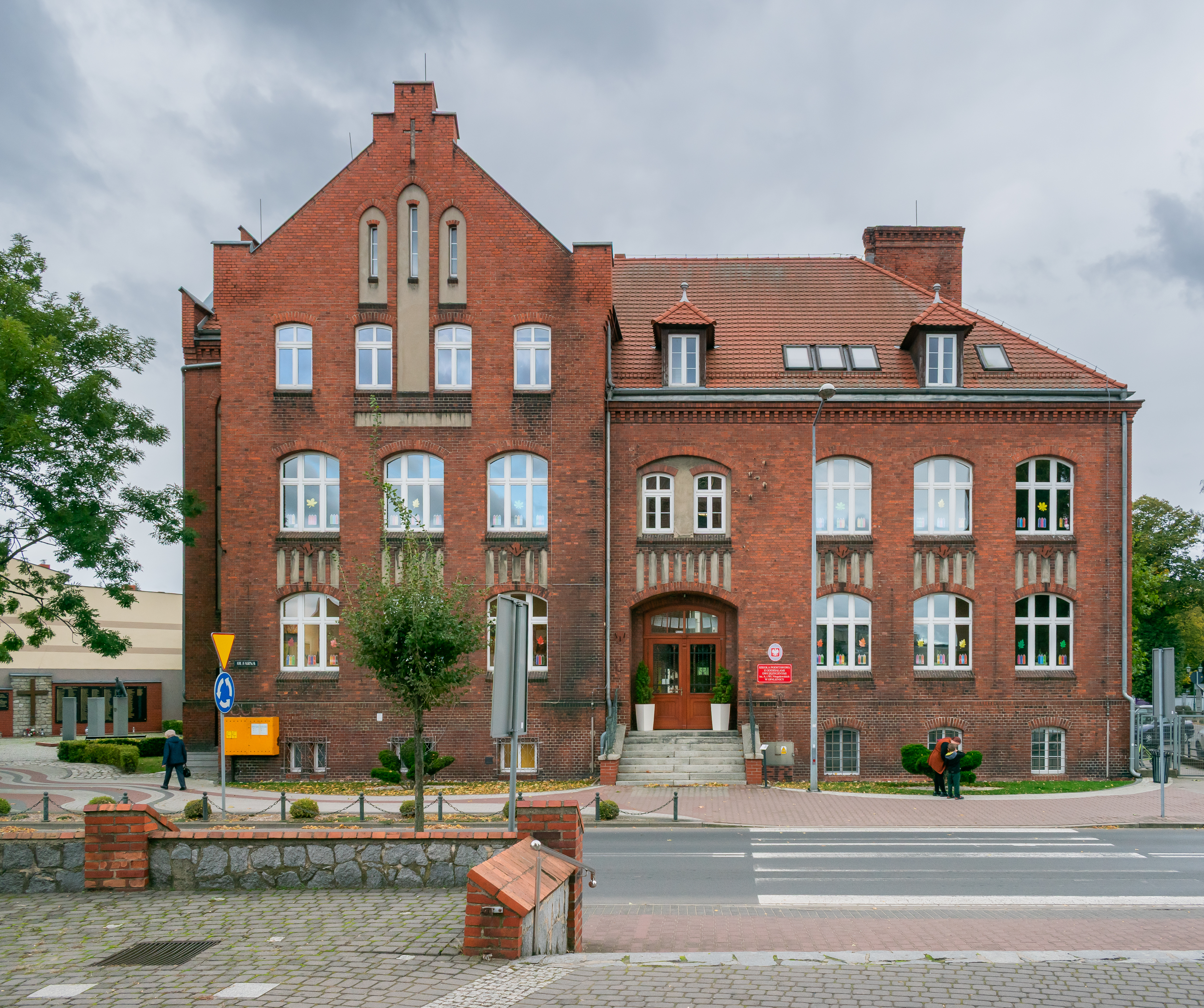
Primary school

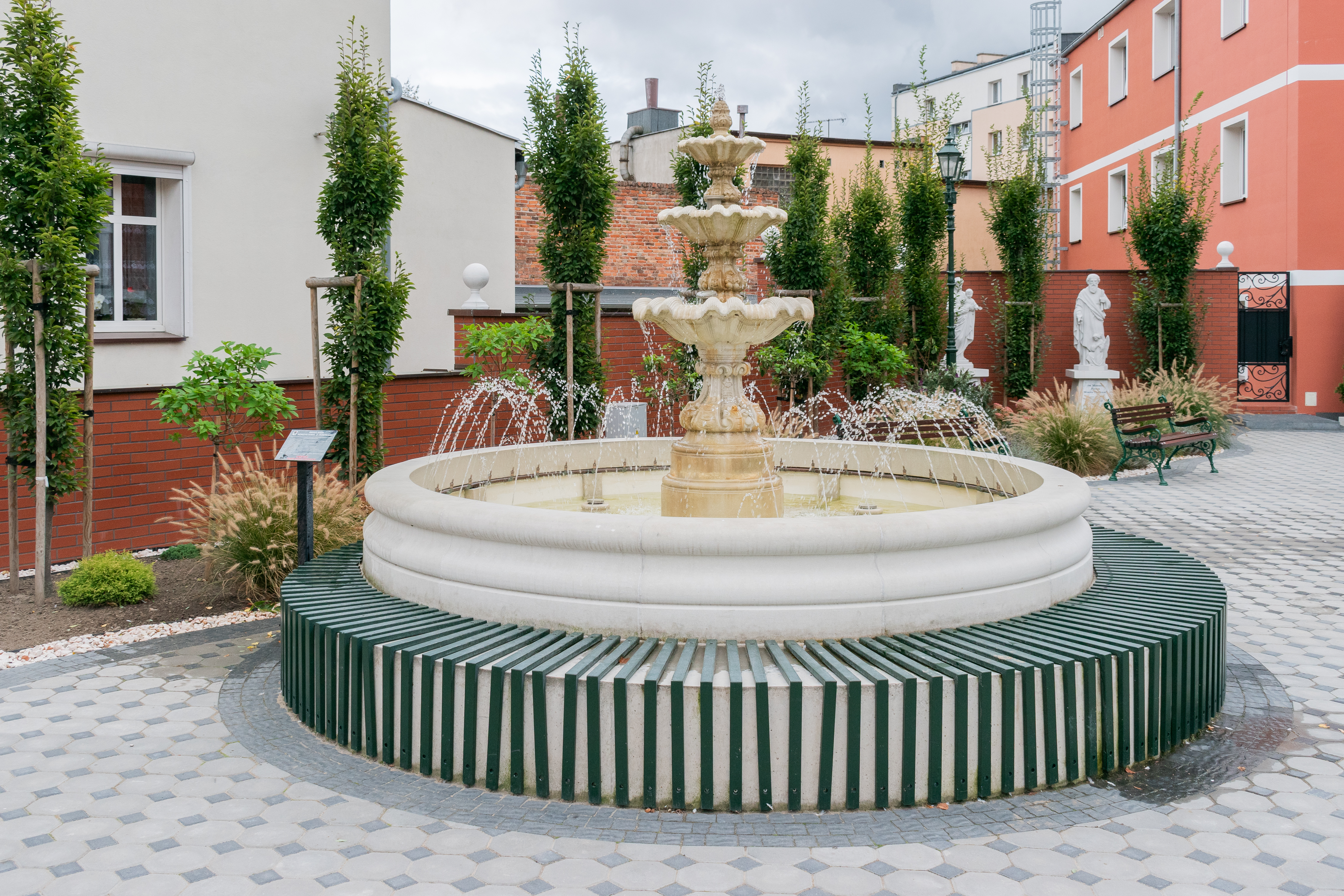
Fountain
