= List of highways numbered 41 =

The following highways are numbered 41:

== International ==
- AH41 Asian Highway 41
- E41 European route E41

== Australia ==
- Olympic Highway
- Mid-Western Highway

== Canada ==
- Alberta Highway 41
- British Columbia Highway 41
- Manitoba Highway 41
- Newfoundland and Labrador Route 41
- Ontario Highway 41
- Saskatchewan Highway 41

== Iceland ==
- Iceland Route 41

== India ==
- National Highway 41 (India)

== Iran ==
- Road 41

== Israel ==
- Highway 41 (Israel)

== Japan ==
- Japan National Route 41
- E41 Noetsu Expressway
- E41 Tōkai-Hokuriku Expressway

== Korea, South ==
- National Route 41

== New Zealand ==
- New Zealand State Highway 41

== Norway ==
- Norwegian National Road 41

== Poland ==
- Autostrada A41 - former short motorway near Kraków (1999-2003/2004)
- National road 41

== United Kingdom ==
- British A41 (Birkenhead-London)

== United States ==
- Interstate 41
- U.S. Route 41
  - U.S. Route 41W (Georgia–Tennessee) (former)
  - U.S. Route 41W (Tennessee–Kentucky) (former)
  - U.S. Route 41E (Georgia) (former)
  - U.S. Route 41E (Georgia–Tennessee) (former)
  - U.S. Route 41E (Tennessee–Kentucky) (former)
- Alabama State Route 41
  - County Route 41 (Lee County, Alabama)
- Arkansas Highway 41
- California State Route 41
  - County Route J41 (California)
- Colorado State Highway 41
- Connecticut Route 41
- Delaware Route 41
- Florida State Road 41
  - County Road 41 (Pasco County, Florida)
- Georgia State Route 41
- Idaho State Highway 41
- Illinois Route 41
- Iowa Highway 41 (former)
- K-41 (Kansas highway)
- Louisiana Highway 41
  - Louisiana State Route 41 (former)
- Maine State Route 41
- Maryland Route 41
- Massachusetts Route 41
- M-41 (Michigan highway) (former)
- Minnesota State Highway 41
- Mississippi Highway 41
- Missouri Route 41
- Montana Highway 41
- Nebraska Highway 41
  - Nebraska Link 41D
  - Nebraska Spur 41B
  - Nebraska Spur 41C
- Nevada State Route 41 (former)
- New Hampshire Route 41
- New Jersey Route 41
  - County Route 41 (Bergen County, New Jersey)
- New Mexico State Road 41
- New York State Route 41
  - County Route 41 (Allegany County, New York)
  - County Route 41 (Dutchess County, New York)
  - County Route 41 (Erie County, New York)
  - County Route 41 (Essex County, New York)
  - County Route 41 (Genesee County, New York)
  - County Route 41 (Greene County, New York)
  - County Route 41 (Livingston County, New York)
  - County Route 41 (Madison County, New York)
  - County Route 41 (Onondaga County, New York)
  - County Route 41 (Ontario County, New York)
  - County Route 41 (Orleans County, New York)
  - County Route 41 (Putnam County, New York)
  - County Route 41 (Rensselaer County, New York)
  - County Route 41 (Rockland County, New York)
  - County Route 41 (Schoharie County, New York)
  - County Route 41 (St. Lawrence County, New York)
  - County Route 41 (Steuben County, New York)
  - County Route 41 (Suffolk County, New York)
  - County Route 41 (Sullivan County, New York)
  - County Route 41 (Tioga County, New York)
  - County Route 41 (Ulster County, New York)
- North Carolina Highway 41
- North Dakota Highway 41
- Ohio State Route 41
- Pennsylvania Route 41
- South Carolina Highway 41
  - South Carolina Highway 41 (1920s) (former)
  - South Carolina Highway 41 (1930s) (former)
- South Dakota Highway 41 (former)
- Tennessee State Route 41
- Texas State Highway 41
  - Farm to Market Road 41
  - Texas State Highway Spur 41 (former)
  - Texas Park Road 41
- Utah State Route 41 (former)
- Virginia State Route 41
  - Virginia State Route 41 (1923-1933) (former)
- Washington State Route 41
- West Virginia Route 41
- Wisconsin Highway 41 (former)

Territories

- Puerto Rico Highway 41

== Thailand ==
- Thailand Route 41

== See also ==
- A41 (disambiguation)#Roads
- List of highways numbered 41A
- Route 41 (King County Metro)

Preceded by 40	Lists of highways 41	Succeeded by 42
