= Nysa–Ścinawa Mała railway =

Railway line in Poland

Overview
- Status: Defunct
- Owner: Neisser Kreisbahn AG; PKP PLK
- Line number: 256 (D29-1971)
- Locale: Poland
- Termini: Nysa Miasto; Ścinawa Mała
- Connecting lines: Sudeten Main Line
- Stations: 9

Service
- Type: Heavy rail
- Rolling stock: Prussian T 3

History
- Opened: 5 December 1911
- Closed: 1 January 1971

Technical
- Line length: 21 km (13 mi)
- Number of tracks: Single track
- Track gauge: 1,435 mm (4 ft 8 1/2 in) standard gauge
- Operating speed: 30 km/h (19 mph)

The Nysa–Ścinawa Mała railway is a defunct 21 km (13 mi) long railway in Poland that was part of the Neisse district railway, connecting the city of Nysa and the village of Ścinawa Mała, the railway later became a branchline. The railway opened in 1911, then it was integrated with Nysa railway station in 1951, the passenger traffic was ceased in 1966 and freight traffic was ceased in 1971, closing the railway.

The railway used to be numbered 126 according to D29 from 1949, the number was changed to 256 in 1971 where it is still used after the closure.

== Route ==
The line starts at Nysa Miasto railway station next to Nysa railway station in Nysa, it goes along the Sudeten Main Line heading south, the line passes Nysa Dworzec Mały railway station (0.9 km of the line) and changes direction to the industrial equipment plant, heading east crossing the railway above. Heading south east, the railway is branched with the industrial equipment plant and the customs warehouse, the line passes Nysa Średnia Wieś station (2.4 km of the line).

The railway shifts south, where it crosses Karol Świerczewski street (Marshal Józef Piłsudzki street) and Baligrodzka street, the line passes Hajduki Nyskie station (5.6 km of the line). The line curves east passing the hill and heads to Kępnica, where it passes Kępnica station (8.6 km of the line), then it heads to Wierzbięcice passing Wierzbięcice station (12 km of the line). The railway shifts east again passing Węża station (16.5 km of the line) and heads to Ścinawa Mała, passing Ścinawa Nyska station (20.4 km of the line) and stopping at Ścinawa Mała railway station (21 km of the line).

== History ==
Before the Neisse Kreisbahn AG company was founded, the plans for the railway existed in May 1901, which was planned to build a railway to improve the shipment of goods and agricultural products from nearby rich villages. The railway was planned to have Neunz (Niwnica) station and Schweinsdorf (Piorunkowice) loading track, however due to the far range from both of the villages, the loading track and the station were never built.

The Prussian State, the district of Neisse as well as other municipalities and interested parties, and Lenz & Co. GmbH company, founded Neisser Kreisbahn AG company on 20 April 1910, as with the plans for the construction of the railway, the Neisse–Steinau railway opened on 5 December 1911, built by Lenz & Co.

The railway was planned to be extended to Zülz (Biała) on the Gogolin–Neustadt (Gogolin–Prudnik) railway and further to Oberglogau (Głogówek) on the Sudeten Main Line, the narrow gauge railway between Steinau and Neustadt was also planned. However, due to the outbreak of World War II both plans were scrapped.

After the war, PKP took over the railway. In 1951, the railway was integrated with the central station for easier access to the railway, becoming a branch line on the Sudeten main line. With the increase of road transport, the passenger traffic was ceased on 1 January 1966, and with the lack of industry outside Nysa, the railway closed on 1 January 1971, as operating the railway seemed unprofitable. It was decided to dismantle the railway on 1 May 1971, with the railway being dismantled in the 1970s. The railway was used as a short branch line to the industrial equipment plant, until it was disused somewhere in the 1990s.

== Service ==
=== Passenger ===
The railway had a planned operating schedule from 1901, where it was supposed to have 6 passenger trains operating each day on the railway. The morning passenger train was meant to depart from Steinau (Ścinawa Mała) and arrive at Neisse, the next 4 trains were meant to stop at Neisse Neuland (Nysa Średnia Wieś) station for freight, making them a mixed train (trains towards Steinau will load their freight and trains towards Neisse will unload their freight.), the last passenger train was meant to depart from Neisse and arrive at Steinau.

Passenger
Mixed

Planned timetable of passenger and mixed trains from 1901
Station	1st train		2nd train		3rd train		4th train		5th train		6th train	
Station	Arrival	Departure	Arrival	Departure	Arrival	Departure	Arrival	Departure	Arrival	Departure	Arrival	Departure
Neisse Stadtbahnhof	6:40	–	–	7:00	14:20	–	–	14:40	21:27	–	–	21:47
Neisse Neuland	6:32	6:33	7:07	7:17	14:08	14:13	14:47	14:57	21:15	21:19	21:54	22:00
Neunz	6:25	6:26	7:23	7:27	13:58	14:02	15:03	15:07	21:05	21:09	22:06	22:07
Heidau	6:18	6:19	7:33	7:37	13:48	13:52	15:13	15:17	20:55	20:59	22:13	22:14
Deutsch Kamitz	6:09	6:09	7:47	7:51	13:34	13:38	15:27	15:31	20:41	20:45	22:22	22:23
Oppersdorf	6:01	6:01	8:00	8:04	13:21	13:25	15:40	15:44	20:28	20:32	22:31	22:32
Prockendorf	5:51	5:51	8:14	8:18	13:07	13:11	15:54	15:58	20:14	20:16	22:41	22:42
Steinau	–	5:38	8:32	–	–	12:53	16:12	–	–	20:00	22:54	–
Direction	To Neisse		To Steinau		To Neisse		To Steinau		To Neisse		To Steinau	

The railway saw 4 passenger trains operating each day in May 1914. The journey between Neisse Stadt and Steinau took between 56 minutes and 1 hour, 3 minutes.

The railway saw 4 passenger trains operating each day in 1943 and 1944.

After the war, PKP took over the railway. The railway saw 3 trains operating each day between 1946 and 1947.

The railway saw 2 trains operating each day between 1947 and 1960, and 3 to 4 trains between 1960 and 1966.

=== Freight ===
In the planned operating schedule from 1901, the railway was meant to have a scheduled freight traffic where it was supposed to have 2 freight trains operating on the railway each day. The morning freight train was meant to depart from Steinau and arrive at Neisse, with the evening freight train it was meant to depart from Neisse and arrive at Steinau. Both freight trains were meant to terminate at Neisse Neuland station.

Freight

Planned timetable of freight trains from 1901
Station	1st train		2nd train	
Station	Arrival	Departure	Arrival	Departure
Neisse Neuland	9:12	–	–	17:32
Neunz	8:57	9:05	17:39	17:47
Heidau	8:42	8:50	17:54	18:02
Deutsch Kamitz	8:23	8:31	18:13	18:21
Oppersdorf	8:04	8:12	18:32	18:40
Prockendorf	7:44	7:52	18:52	19:00
Steinsdorf	7:24	7:30	19:14	19:22
Steinau	–	7:20	19:26	–
Direction	To Neisse		To Steinau	

The railway relied mostly on agricultural products, and sometimes industrial products. The most important freight customer of the railway was Zakłady Urządzeń Przemysłowych w Nysie (Industrial Equipment Plant in Nysa), which relied on rail transport to transport industrial equipment from the factory, the factory used the railway until the 1990s when it considered relying it on road transport. The other goods railway relied came from certain villages, including Oppersdorf (Wierzbięcice). Agricultural products were relied mostly on the railway, as the railway was built on purpose to transport grain and other products from rich villages.

== Rolling stock ==
The railway used mostly Prussian T 3 locomotives from Neisse, the locomotives were used for passenger, mixed and freight traffic on the railway. After the war, the railway used locomotives from Nysa railway depot.
