= National road 41 (Poland) =

Road in Poland

National Road 41
- Droga krajowa nr 41

Route information
- Maintained by GDDKiA
- Length: 33 km (21 mi)

Major junctions
- From: Nysa
- To: Prudnik

Location
- Country: Poland
- Regions: Opole Voivodeship
- Major cities: Nysa, Prudnik

Highway system
- National roads in Poland; Voivodeship roads
← DK 40	→ DK 42

National Road 41 (Polish: Droga krajowa 41) is a route belonging to the Polish national roads network. The route runs from Nysa to Prudnik, in the Opole Voivodeship, then on to the border with the Czech Republic.

From 1999 to 2003/2004 there was a motorway A41 in Poland, that had nothing in common with national road 41.

== Settlements along the National Road 41 ==
- Nysa
- Niwnica
- Wierzbięcice
- Piorunkowice
- Rudziczka
- Niemysłowice
- Prudnik
- Trzebina

== Route plan ==
km	Icon	Name	Crossed roads
0		Roundabout Nysa	
0.04		Bridge over the Nysa Kłodzka	—
1.26		Nysa	
2.24		Nysa	
2.40		Drive under a railway viaduct Katowice—Legnica	—
28.39		Roundabout Prudnik	
29.70		Roundabout Prudnik	
33		Border crossing with the Czech Republic at Trzebina—Bartultovice	
