= Jędrzychów =

Jędrzychów may refer to:

- Jędrzychów, Lower Silesian Voivodeship (south-west Poland)
- Jędrzychów, Opole Voivodeship (south-west Poland)
