= Podkamień =

- Village
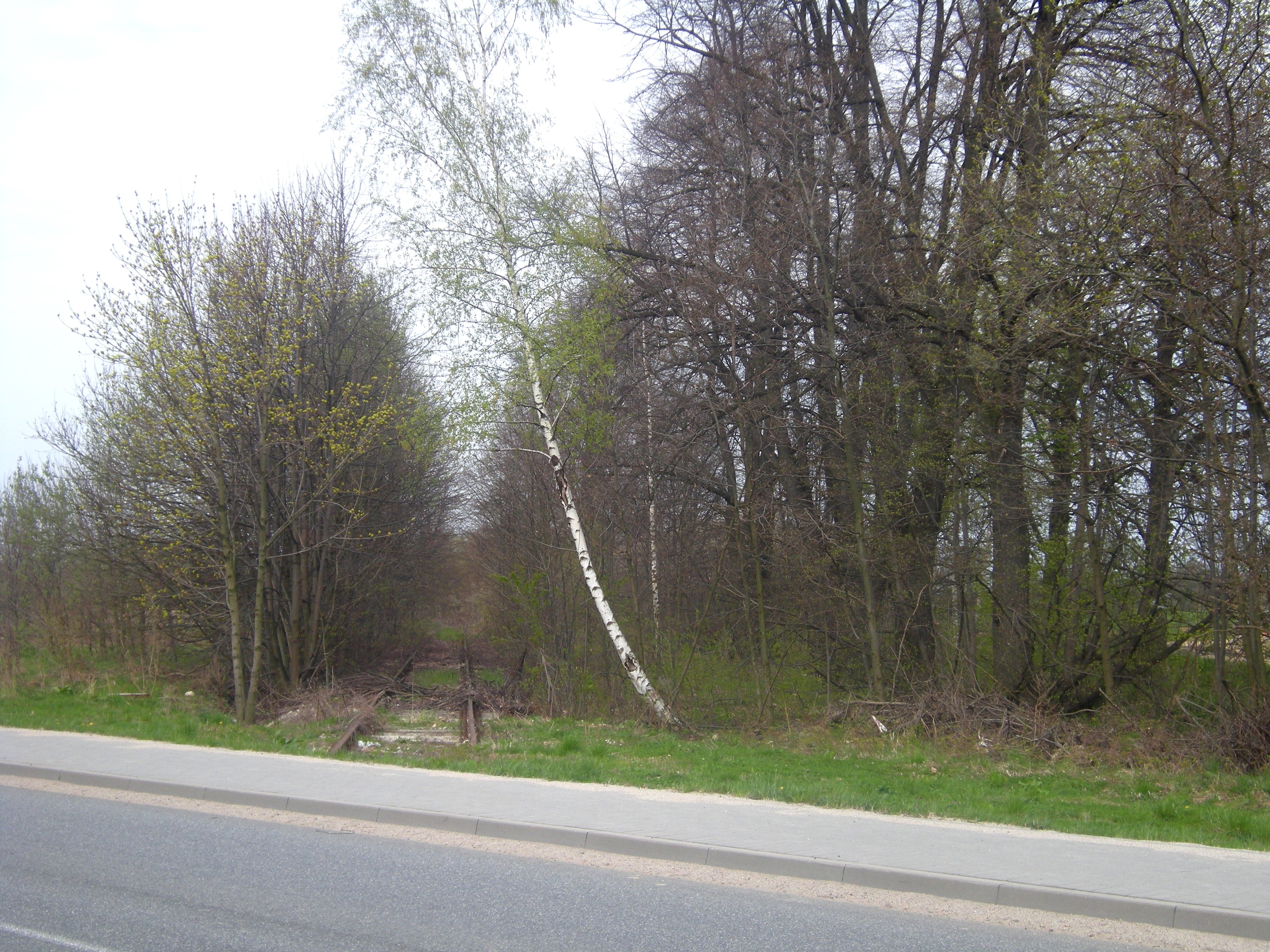

- Location within Poland
- Coordinates: 50°26′N 17°21′E
- Country: Poland
- Voivodeship: Opole
- County: Nysa
- Gmina: Nysa
- Population (approx.): 100

Podkamień [pɔtˈkamjɛɲ] (German: Steinhübel) is a village in the administrative district of Gmina Nysa, within Nysa County, Opole Voivodeship, in south-western Poland.

== Notable people ==
- Rudolf Günsberg, German chemist
