= Gunsberg =

Gunsberg may refer to:

- Isidor Gunsberg, a Hungarian chess player
- Andrew Günsberg, an Australian radio and television presenter
- Rudolf Günsberg, a Ukrainian chemist
- Günsberg, a municipality in Solothurn, Switzerland
