= Grünau =

Grünau or Grunau might refer to:

== Places ==
=== Austria ===
- Grünau im Almtal, a gemeinde in the bezirk of Gmunden, Oberösterreich
- Hofstetten-Grünau, a marktgemeinde in the bezirk of Sankt Pölten-Land, Niederösterreich

=== Czech Republic ===
- German name for Gruna, a village and municipality (obec) in Svitavy District, Pardubice

=== Germany ===
- Grünau, Berlin, an ortsteil in the bezirk of Treptow-Köpenick, Berlin
- Grünau Charterhouse, a former monastery in the Regierungsbezirk of Unterfranken, Bavaria
- Grünau (Leipzig), a late 20th century housing estate in Leipzig

=== Namibia ===
- Grünau, Namibia, a settlement in ǁKharas Region

=== Poland ===
- German name for Stare Gronowo, a village in Człuchów County, Pomorze
- German name for Siestrzechowice, a village in Nysa County, Opole
- German name for Jeżów Sudecki, a village in Jelenia Góra County, Lower Silesian Voivodeship

=== Russia ===
- Grünau (Grunau) - rustic village #6 of the Russian Empire (now the territory of Ukraine), founded by German colonists from Prussia in 1823-1824

== People ==
- August Grunau (1881–1931), German politician and Unionist
- Simon Grunau, 16th-century German chronicler

== See also ==
- Schneider Grunau Baby, a German sailplane
