= Latinisation of names =

Practice of rendering a non-Latin name in a Latin style

Latinisation (or Latinization) of names is the practice of changing certain non-Latin names into a form that more closely fits the style, structure, and rules of Latin. The practice is found with historical proper names, including personal names and toponyms, and in the standard binomial nomenclature of the life sciences. In present-day English, the practice of using Latinised names for certain prominent individuals began in the medieval period of Europe and peaked in the Renaissance. In some cases, the individuals themselves even used or created these Latinised names.

Latinisation is distinct from romanisation, which is the transliteration of a word to the Latin alphabet, more or less letter-for-letter or sound-for-sound, from another script (e.g. the writing systems of Cyrillic, Devanagari/Hindi, Arabic, etc.). For authors writing in Latin, this change allows the name to function grammatically in a sentence through declension. Many other reasons for an author to apply this to their own name also existed, such as forming a more international identity or hiding the modest social background revealed by their origin name.

In a scientific context, the main purpose of Latinisation may be to produce a name which is internationally consistent.

Latinisation may be carried out by:

- transforming the name into Latin sounds (e.g. Geber for Jabir), or
- adding Latinate suffixes to the end of a name (e.g. Meibomius for Meibom), or
- translating a name with a specific meaning into Latin (e.g. Venator for Italian Cacciatore; both mean 'hunter'), or
- choosing a new name based on some attribute of the person (e.g. Daniel Santbech became Noviomagus, possibly from the Latin (actually Latinised Gaulish) name for the town of Nijmegen, and meaning 'new field').

== Personal names ==
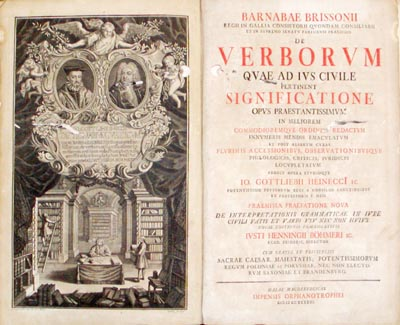
Frontispiece of a 1743 legal text by Barnabé Brisson shows his name Latinised in the genitive Barnabae Brissonii ('of Barnabas Brissonius'). Barnabas is itself a Greek version of an Aramaic name.

English, and sometimes other modern European languages, use Latinised names for certain historical figures from the medieval and particularly Renaissance periods, or in references that begin in the Renaissance to even older figures.

Renaissance humanists largely assumed Latinised names, though in some cases (e.g. Melanchthon) they invoked Ancient Greek. For instance, Beatus Bild from Rhinau assumed the Latinised named Beatus Rhenanus. Latinisation in humanist names may consist of translation from vernacular European languages, sometimes involving a playful element of punning. Such names could also be a cover for humble social origins.

The title of the "Wilhelmus", national anthem of the Netherlands, preserves a Latinised form of the name of William the Silent.

=== Notable examples ===
Some English examples of Latinised names that are typical for certain historical figures include:

- The ancient Chinese philosopher Confucius, from his Chinese name Kong Fuzi (lit. 'Master Kong')
- The ancient Chinese philosopher Mencius, from his Chinese name Mengzi (lit. 'Master Meng')
- The Islamic Golden Age philosopher and medical scholar Avicenna, from his Arabic name ibn Sina (lit. 'male descendant of Sina')
- The German Christian scholar and saint Albertus Magnus, meaning Albert the Great, from the original German Albert
- The Italian Christian scholar and saint Thomas Aquinas, originally the Italian Tommaso plus his hometown of Aquino
- The Scottish Christian scholar Duns Scotus, meaning Duns the Scot
- The Netherlandish artist Hieronymus Bosch, originally the Dutch Jheronimus plus his hometown of Den Bosch
- The explorer Columbus, from his original Western Romance name of Corombo or Colombo
- The Polish-Prussian astronomer Nicolaus Copernicus, from the Middle Low German Niclas or Niklas plus Koppernigk (lit. 'from Koperniki': his father's hometown)

== Place names ==
In English, place names often appear in Latinised form. This is a result of the fact that many early mentions of the place were in text books written in Latin. Because of this, the English language often uses Latinised forms of foreign place names instead of anglicised forms or the original names.

Examples of Latinised names for countries or regions are:

- Estonia (Estonian name Eesti, Dutch/German/Scandinavian name Estland, i.e. 'land of the Aesti')
- Ingria (Finnish Inkerinmaa, German/Scandinavian Ingermanland, i.e. 'land of the Ingermans', the local tribe)
- Livonia (German/Scandinavian name Livland', i.e. 'land of the Livs', the local tribe)

Eboracum was the Latinised name for the modern English city York. It is a Latinised form of the Brittonic name *Eburākon which means 'place of (the) yew trees'. The Common Brittonic language was spoken by the indigenous people of Britain and evolved into modern Welsh, Cornish, and Breton (Brezhoneg).

== Scientific names ==
Latinisation is a common practice for scientific names. For example, Livistona, the name of a genus of palm trees, is a Latinisation of Livingstone.

== Historical background ==
During the age of the Roman Empire, translation of names into Latin (in the West) or Greek (in the East) was common. Additionally, Latinised versions of Greek substantives, particularly proper nouns, could easily be declined by Latin speakers with minimal modification of the original word.

During the medieval period, after the Empire collapsed in Western Europe, the main bastion of scholarship was the Roman Catholic Church, for which Latin was the primary written language. In the early medieval period, most European scholars were priests and most educated people spoke Latin, and as a result, Latin became firmly established as the scholarly language for the West.

By the middle of the 19th century, Europe had largely abandoned Latin as a scholarly language (at first for a combination of several major modern European languages - but by the early 21st century, most scientific studies and scholarly publications were being printed in English), but a variety of fields still use Latin terminology as the norm. By tradition, it is still common in some fields to name new discoveries in Latin. And because Western science became dominant during the 18th and 19th centuries, the use of Latin names in many scholarly fields has gained worldwide acceptance, at least when European languages are being used for communication.

== Sources ==
- Nicolson, Dan H. (1974). "Orthography of Names and Epithets: Latinization of Personal Names". Taxon. 23 (4). International Association for Plant Taxonomy: 549–561. doi:10.2307/1218779. JSTOR 1218779.
- Gordin, Michael D. (2015). Scientific Babel: The Language of Science from the Fall of Latin to the Rise of English. London: Profile Books. ISBN 978-1-781-25114-0.
