= Gmina Nysa =

Gmina Nysa Nysa Commune
- Gmina
- Flag Coat of arms
- Interactive map of Gmina Nysa
- Coordinates (Nysa): 50°28′17″N 17°20′2″E
- Country: Poland
- Voivodeship: Opole
- County: Nysa
- Seat: Nysa

Area
  - Total: 217.6 km^{2} (84.0 sq mi)

Population (2019-06-30)
  - Total: 57,077
  - Density: 262.3/km^{2} (679.4/sq mi)
  - Urban: 43,849
  - Rural: 13,228
- Website: http://www.nysa.pl

Gmina Nysa is an urban-rural gmina (administrative district) in Nysa County, Opole Voivodeship, in south-western Poland. Its seat is the town of Nysa, which lies approximately 48 kilometres (30 mi) south-west of the regional capital Opole.

The gmina covers an area of 217.6 square kilometres (84.0 sq mi), and as of 2019 its total population is 57,077.

== Villages ==
Apart from the town of Nysa, Gmina Nysa contains the villages and settlements of Biała Nyska, Domaszkowice, Głębinów, Goświnowice, Hajduki Nyskie, Hanuszów, Iława, Jędrzychów, Kępnica, Konradowa, Koperniki, Kubice, Lipowa, Morów, Niwnica, Podkamień, Przełęk, Radzikowice, Regulice, Rusocin, Sękowice, Siestrzechowice, Skorochów, Wierzbięcice, Wyszków Śląski and Złotogłowice.

== Neighbouring gminas ==
Gmina Nysa is bordered by the gminas of Głuchołazy, Korfantów, Łambinowice, Otmuchów, Pakosławice and Prudnik.

== Twin towns – sister cities ==
Gmina Nysa is twinned with:

- (Georgia (country)) Batumi, Georgia
- Ingelheim am Rhein, Germany
- Jeseník, Czech Republic
- Kolomyia, Ukraine
- Lüdinghausen, Germany
- Šumperk, Czech Republic
- Ternopil, Ukraine
