= Głębinów =

- Village
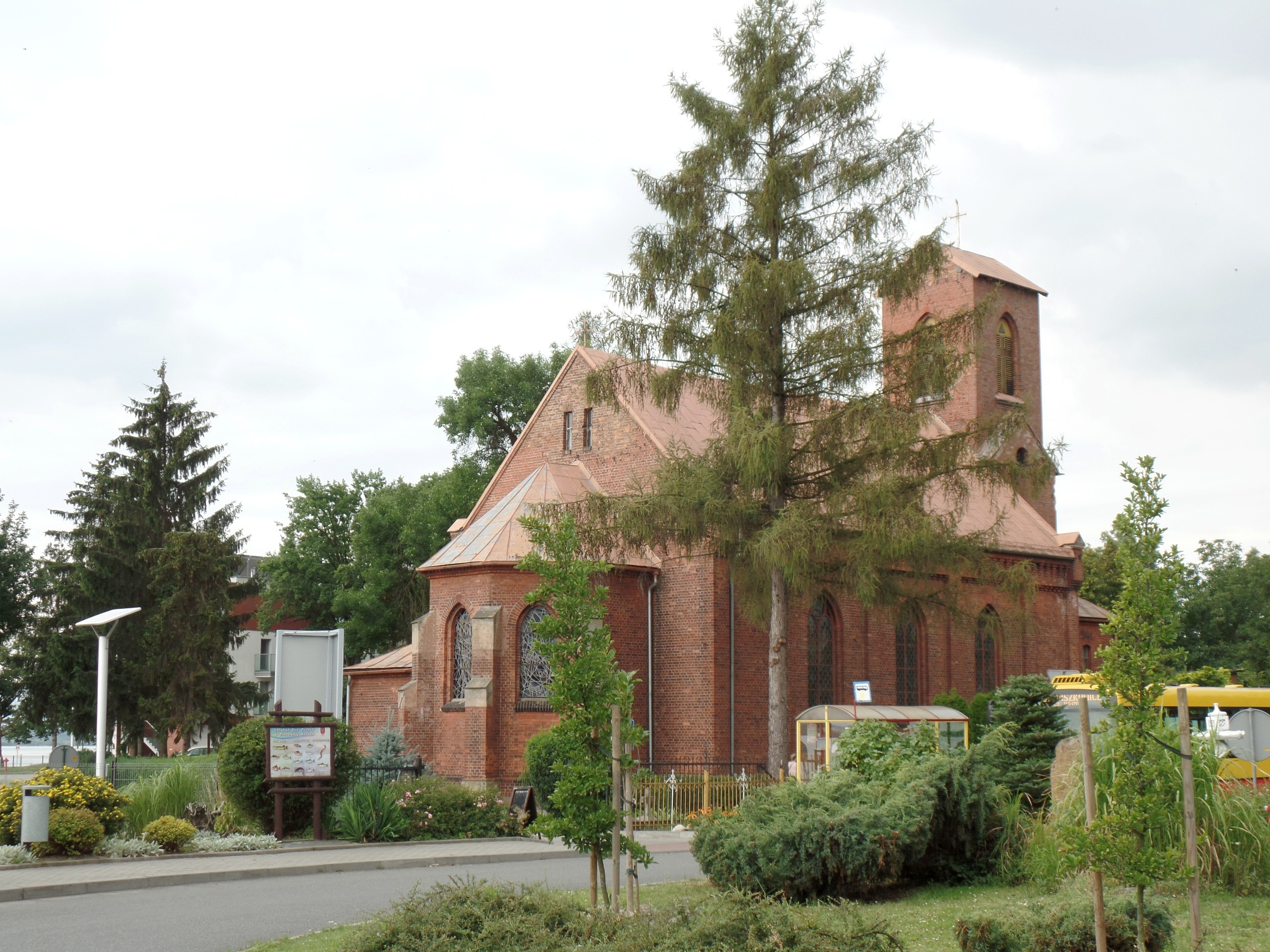
- Catholic church

- Location within Poland
- Coordinates: 50°27′N 17°16′E
- Country: Poland
- Voivodeship: Opole
- County: Nysa
- Gmina: Nysa
- Population: 150

Głębinów [ɡwɛmˈbinuf] (German: Glumpenau) is a village in the administrative district of Gmina Nysa, within Nysa County, Opole Voivodeship, in south-western Poland.
