= Skorochów =

- Village
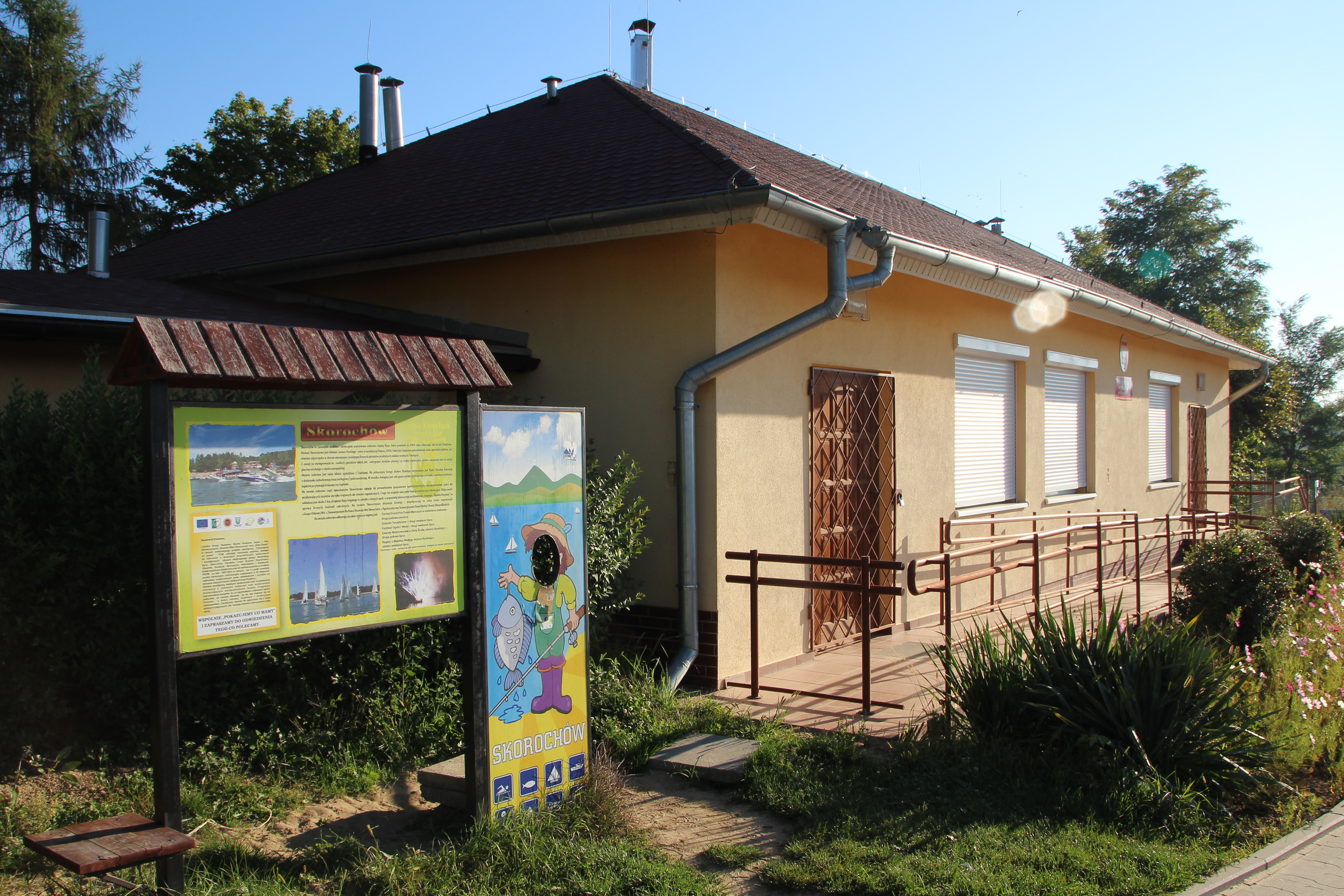

- Location within Poland
- Coordinates: 50°28′28″N 17°17′11″E
- Country: Poland
- Voivodeship: Opole
- County: Nysa
- Gmina: Nysa
- Population: 115

Skorochów [skɔˈrɔxuf] (German: Kohlsdorf) is a village in the administrative district of Gmina Nysa, within Nysa County, Opole Voivodeship, in south-western Poland.
