= Wyszków Śląski =

- Village
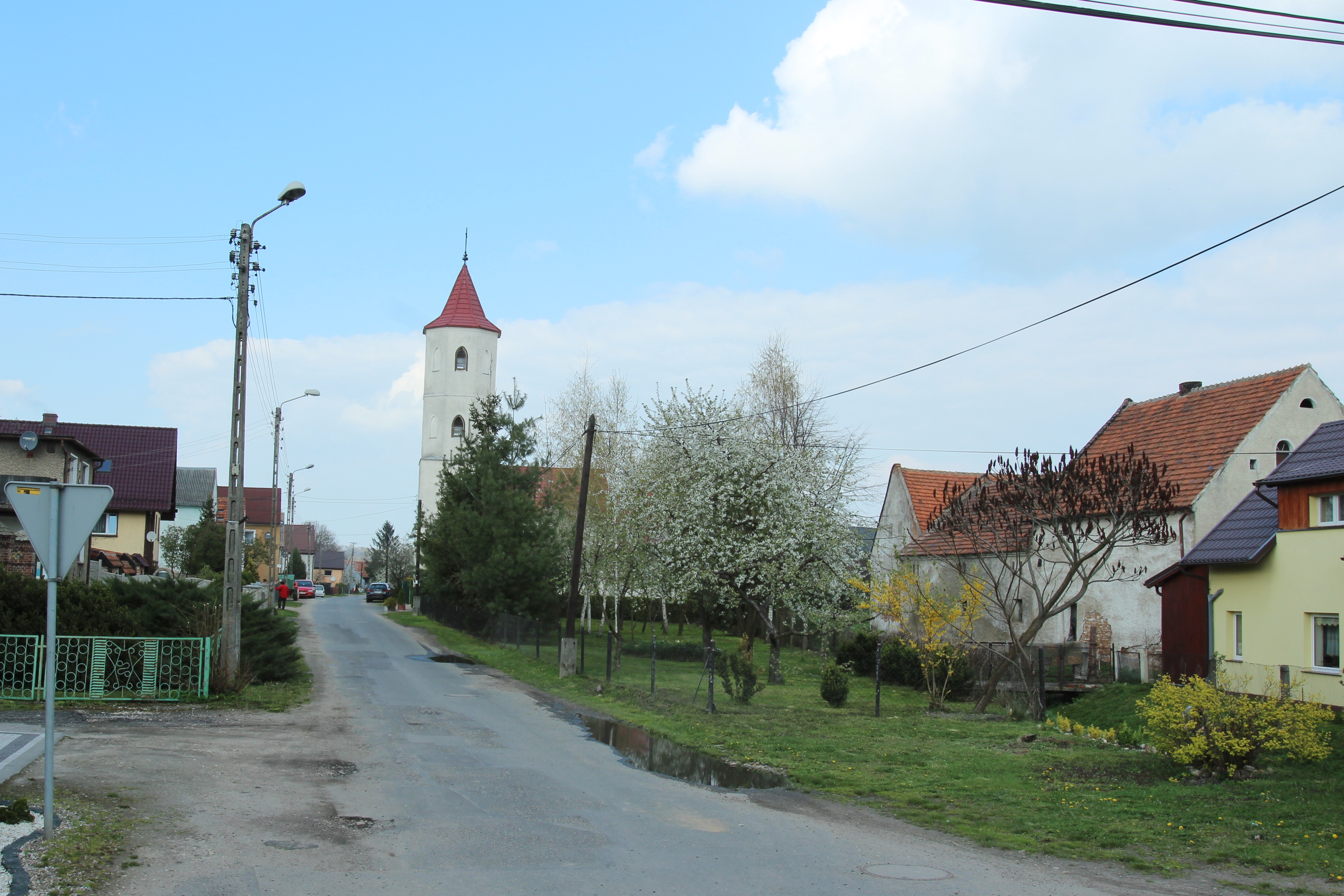

- Location within Poland
- Coordinates: 50°28′06″N 17°23′26″E
- Country: Poland
- Voivodeship: Opole
- County: Nysa
- Gmina: Nysa

Wyszków Śląski Polish pronunciation: [ˈvɨʂkuf ˈɕlɔ̃skʲi] (German: Wischke) is a village in the administrative district of Gmina Nysa, within Nysa County, Opole Voivodeship, in south-western Poland.
