= Sękowice, Opole Voivodeship =

Sękowice
- Village
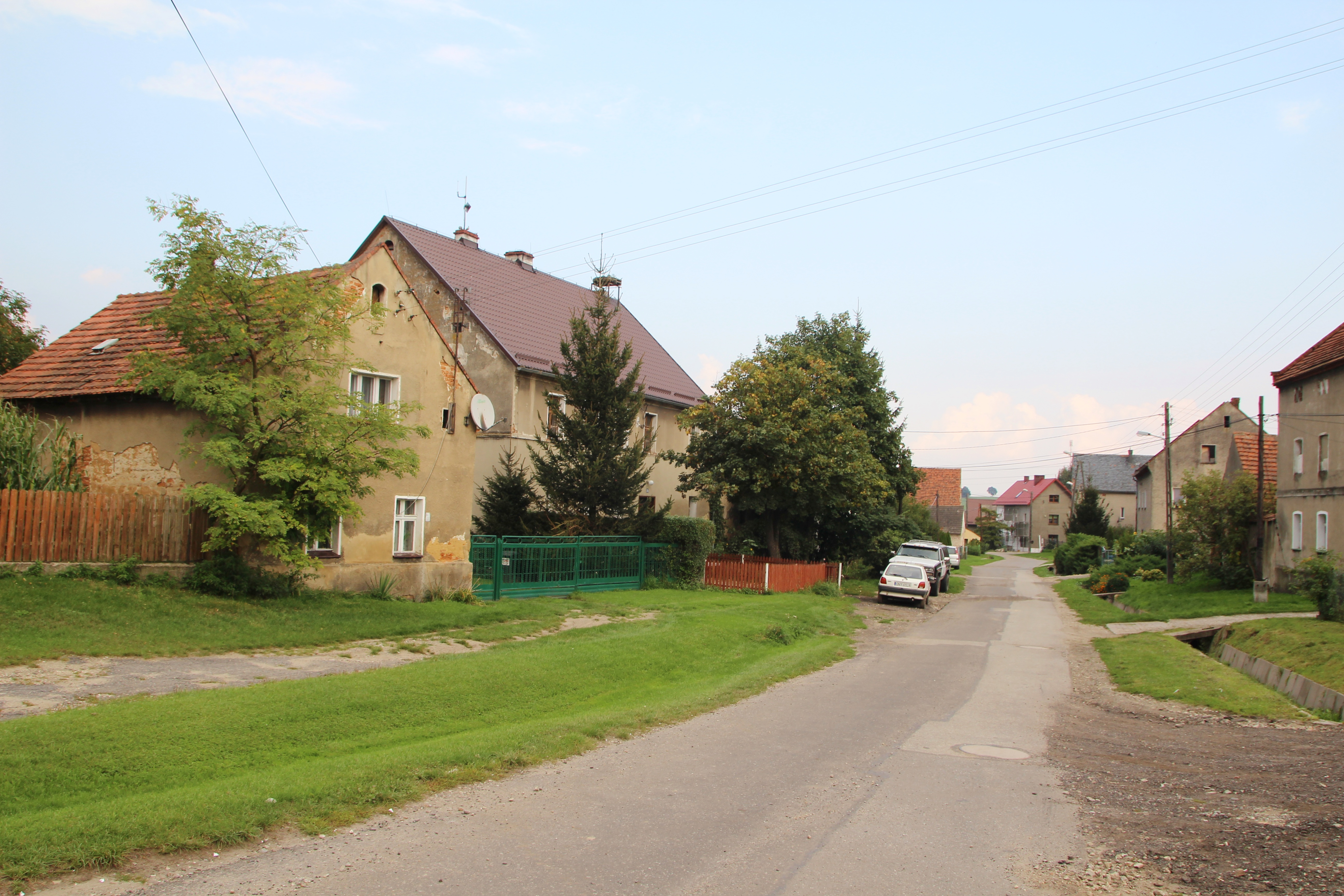
- Sękowice, Opole Voivodeship

- Location within Poland
- Coordinates: 50°30′53″N 17°18′26″E
- Country: Poland
- Voivodeship: Opole
- County: Nysa
- Gmina: Nysa

Sękowice [sɛnkɔˈvit͡sɛ] (German: Sengwitz) is a village in the administrative district of Gmina Nysa, within Nysa County, Opole Voivodeship, in south-western Poland.
