= Domaszkowice =

- Village
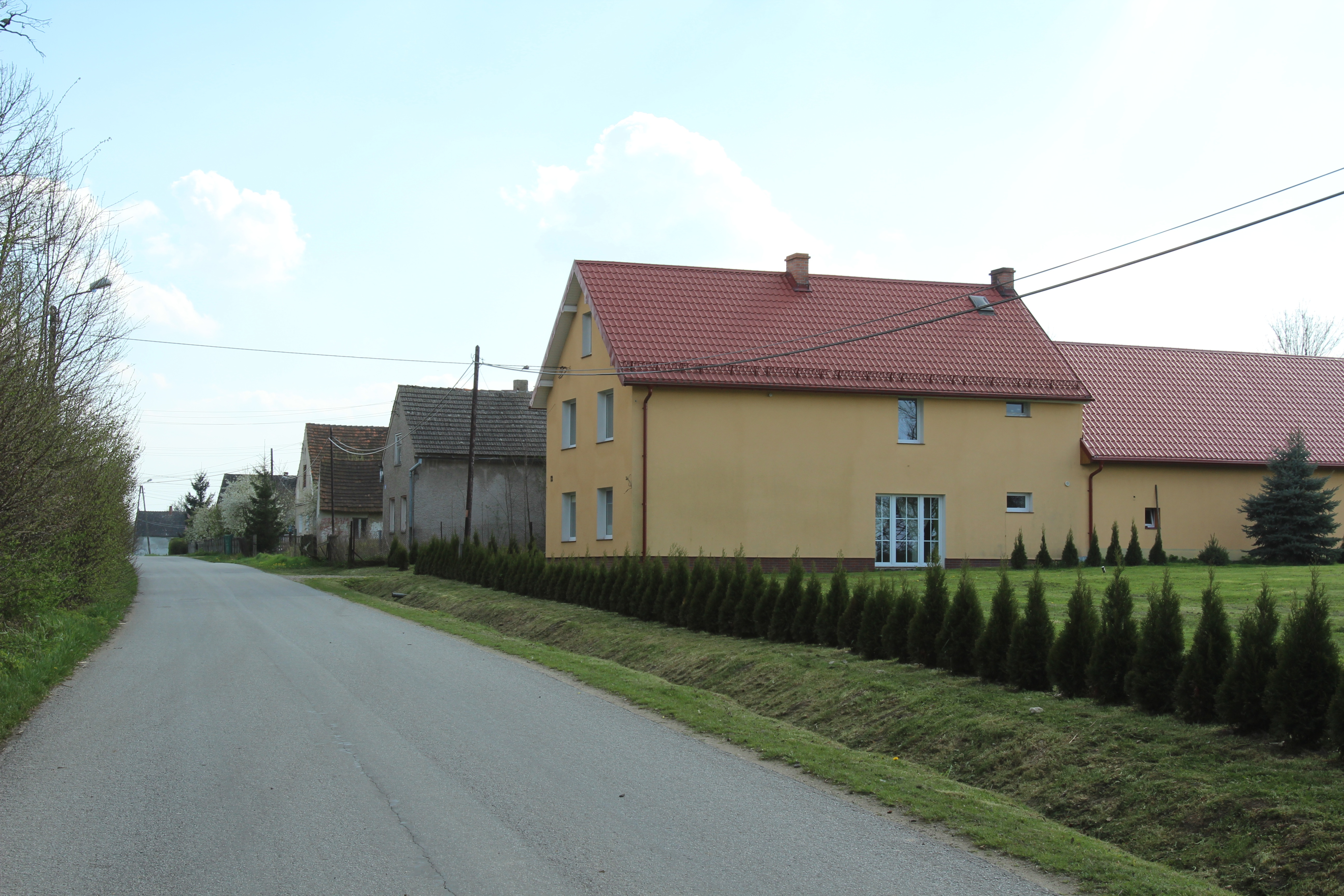

- Location within Poland
- Coordinates: 50°27′N 17°26′E
- Country: Poland
- Voivodeship: Opole
- County: Nysa
- Gmina: Nysa
- Population: 633

Domaszkowice [dɔmaʂkɔˈvit͡sɛ] (German: Ritterswalde) is a village in the administrative district of Gmina Nysa, within Nysa County, Opole Voivodeship, in south-western Poland.

Before 1945 the area was part of Silesia (Schlesien) Germany and was known as the town of Ritterswalde (see Territorial changes of Poland after World War II).
