= Morów =

- Village
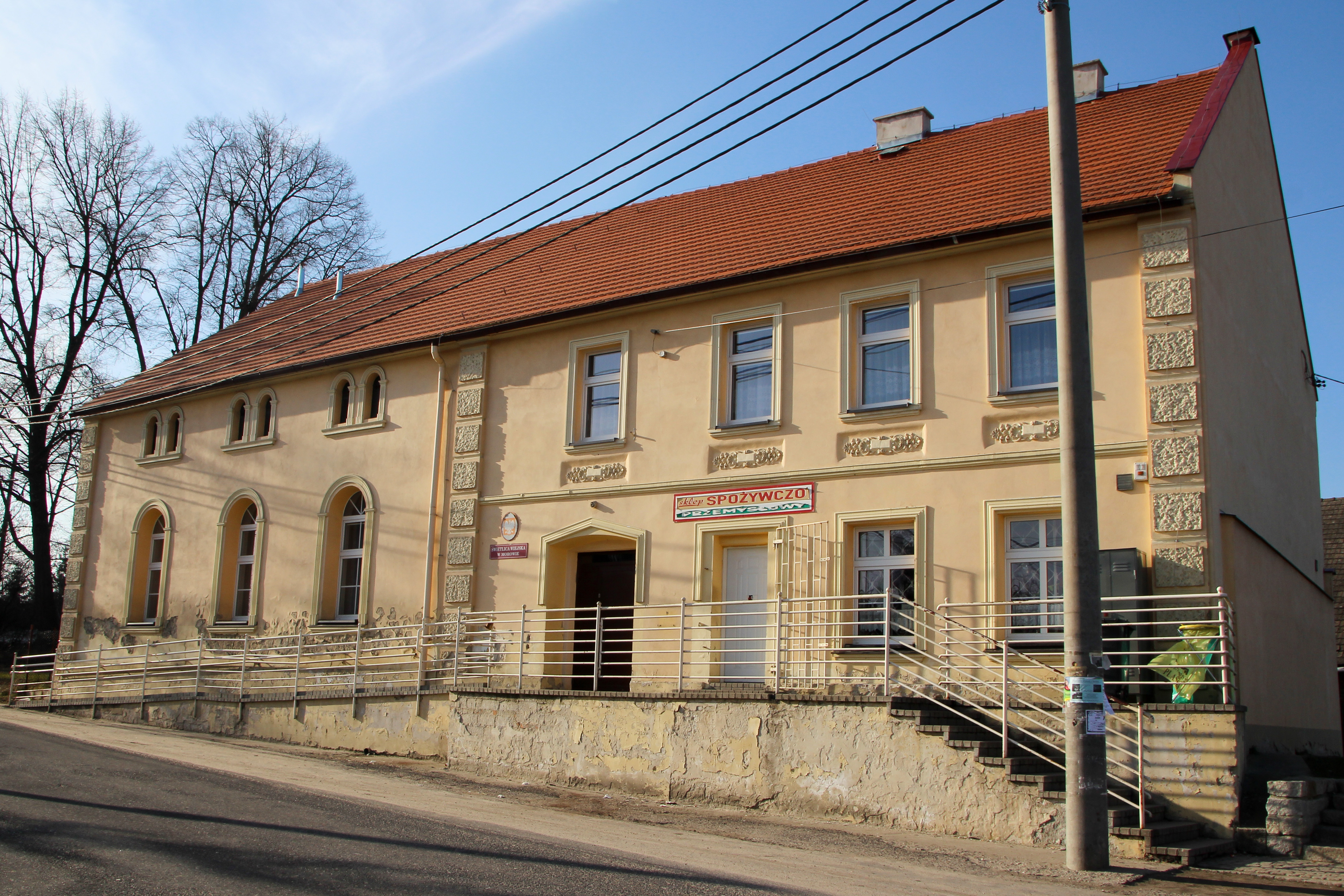
- Community center and grocery store in Morów

- Location within Poland
- Coordinates: 50°25′N 17°17′E
- Country: Poland
- Voivodeship: Opole
- County: Nysa
- Gmina: Nysa
- Time zone: UTC+1 (CET)
  - Summer (DST): UTC+2 (CEST)
- Vehicle registration: ONY

Morów [ˈmɔruf] (German: Mohrau) is a village in the administrative district of Gmina Nysa, within Nysa County, Opole Voivodeship, in south-western Poland.

10 Polish citizens were murdered by Nazi Germany in the village during World War II.
