= Lipowa, Nysa County =

Lipowa
- Village
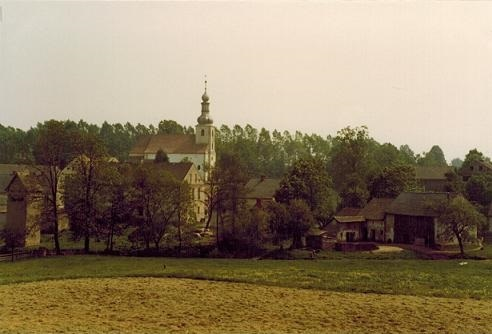

- Location within Poland
- Coordinates: 50°24′N 17°29′E
- Country: Poland
- Voivodeship: Opole
- County: Nysa
- Gmina: Nysa

Lipowa [liˈpɔva] (German: Lindenau) is a village in the administrative district of Gmina Nysa, within Nysa County, Opole Voivodeship, in south-western Poland.

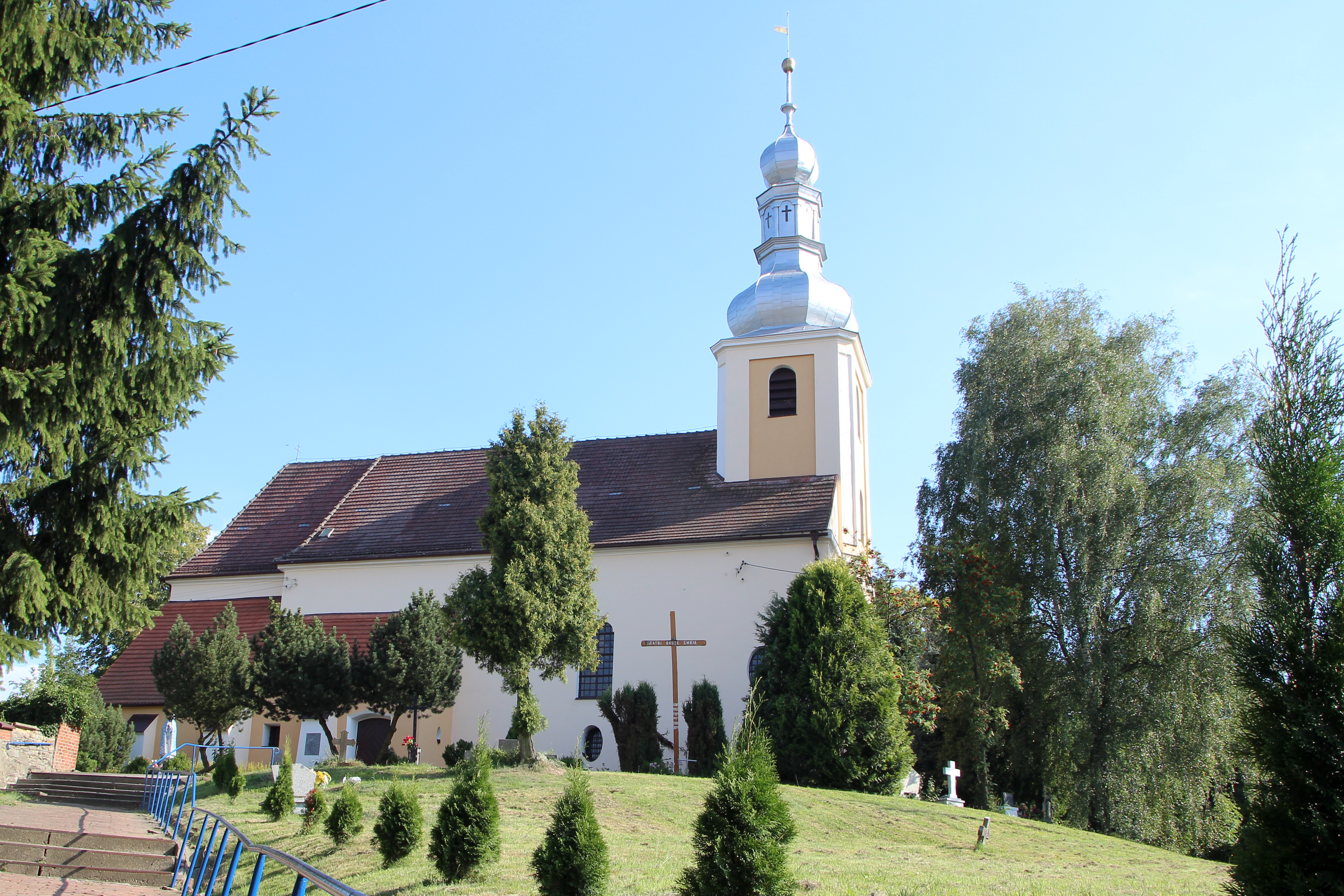
Church St. Katharina

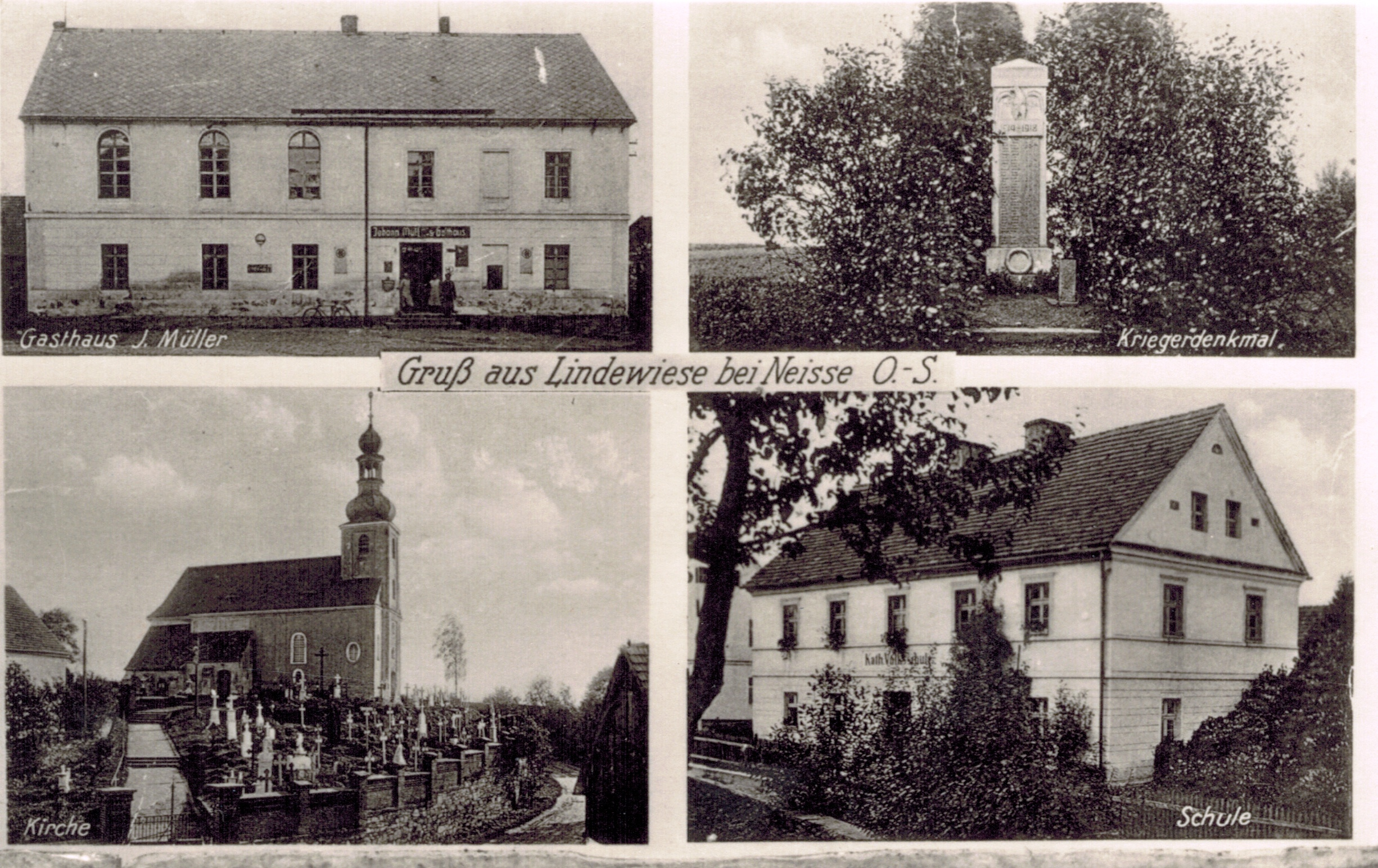
Postcard (1930)

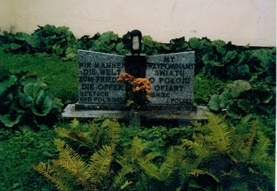
memorial stone for the victims of NS-violence and World War II at St. Katharina
