= Hanuszów =

- Village
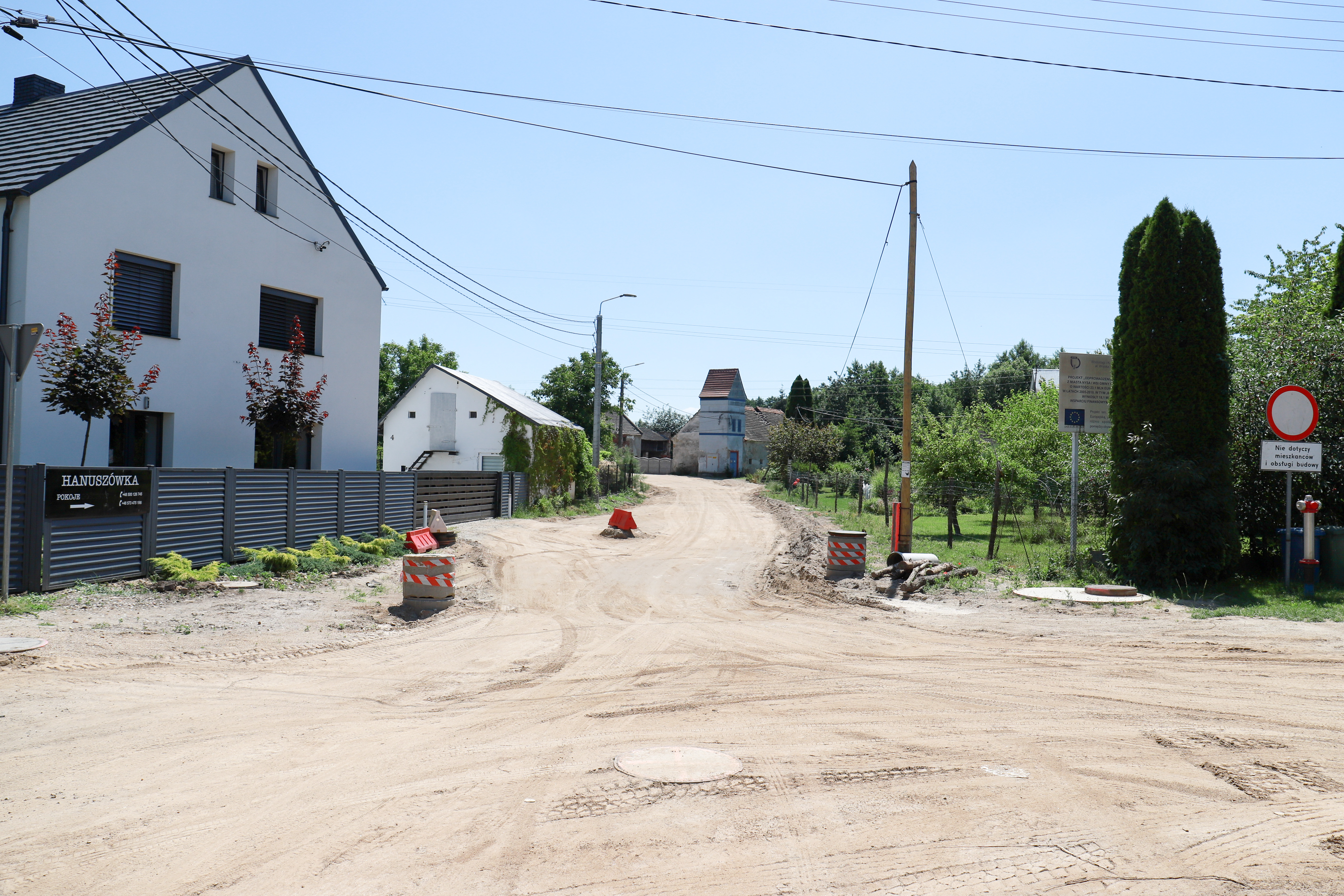

- Location within Poland
- Coordinates: 50°31′N 17°21′E
- Country: Poland
- Voivodeship: Opole
- County: Nysa
- Gmina: Nysa

Hanuszów [xaˈnuʂuf] (German: Hannsdorf) is a village in the administrative district of Gmina Nysa, within Nysa County, Opole Voivodeship, in south-western Poland.
