= Rusocin, Opole Voivodeship =

Rusocin
- Village
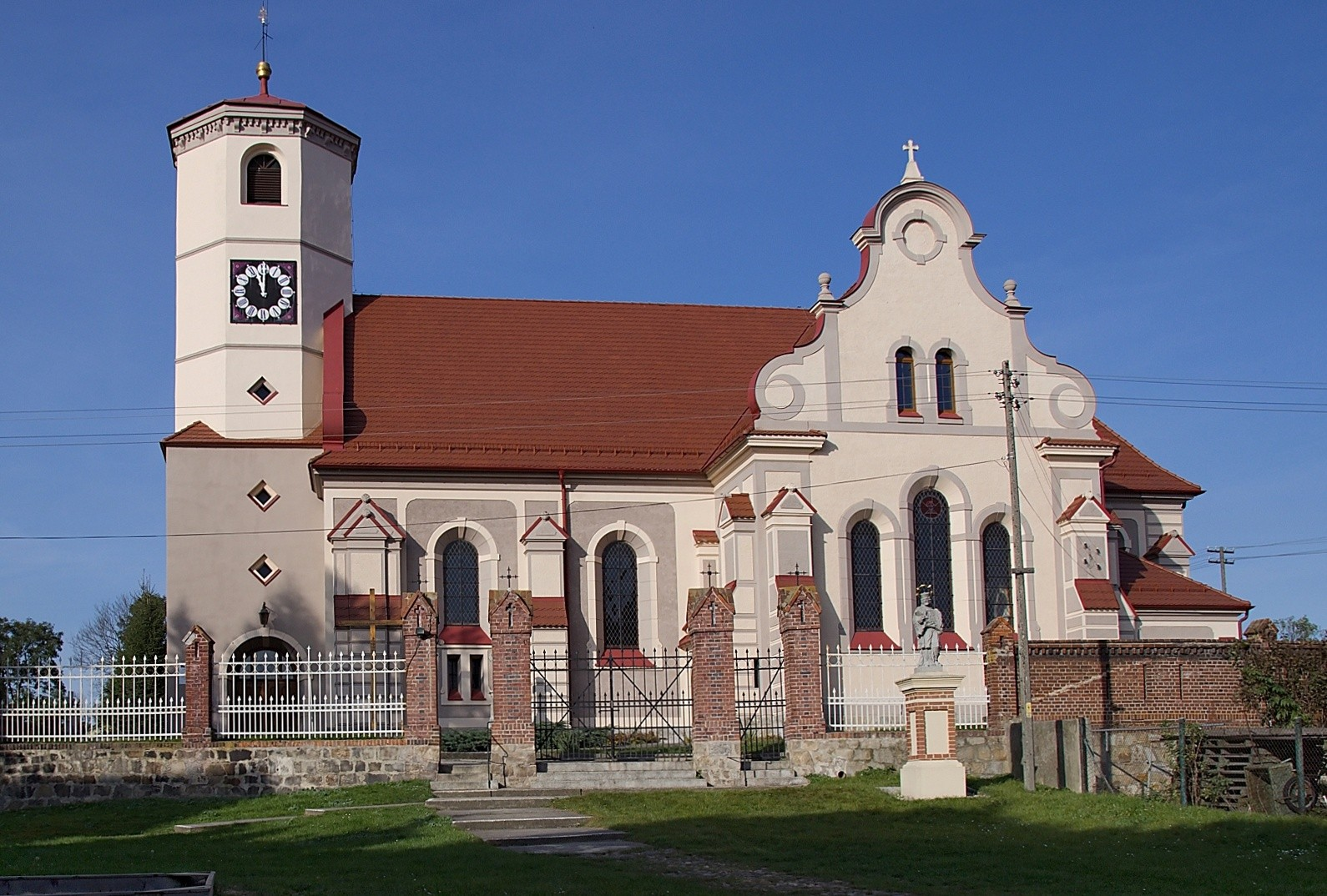
- Catholic church

- Location within Poland
- Coordinates: 50°30′N 17°23′E
- Country: Poland
- Voivodeship: Opole
- County: Nysa
- Gmina: Nysa

Rusocin [ruˈsɔt͡ɕin] (German: Riemertsheide) is a village in the administrative district of Gmina Nysa, within Nysa County, Opole Voivodeship, in south-western Poland.
