= Iława, Opole Voivodeship =

Iława
- Village
- Location within Poland
- Coordinates: 50°24′N 17°18′E
- Country: Poland
- Voivodeship: Opole
- County: Nysa
- Gmina: Nysa

Iława [iˈwava] (German: Eilau) is a village in the administrative district of Gmina Nysa, within Nysa County, Opole Voivodeship, in south-western Poland.
