= Złotogłowice =

- Village
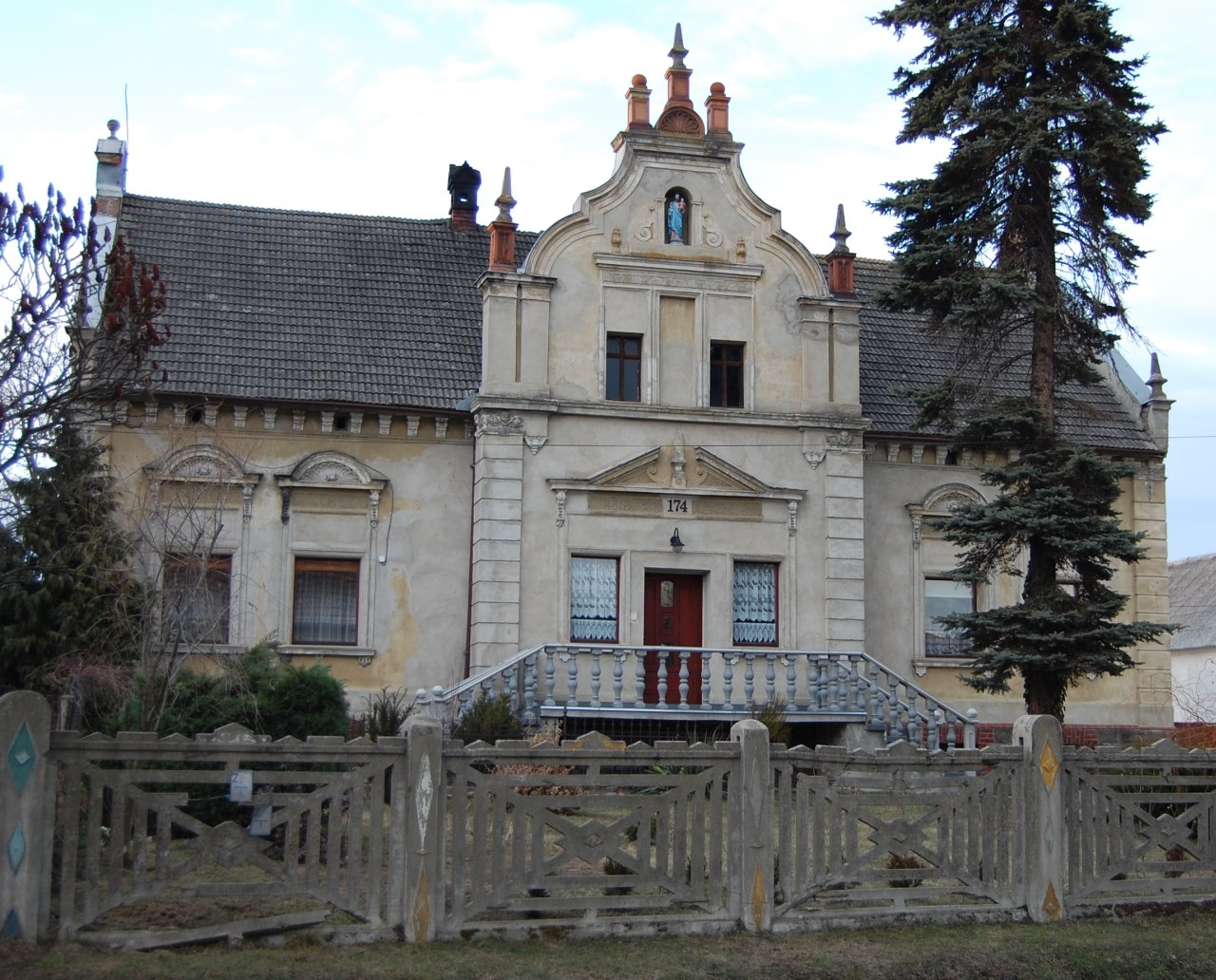
- Residential house no. 174, formerly Hof Kinne

- Location within Poland
- Coordinates: 50°30′N 17°23′E
- Country: Poland
- Voivodeship: Opole
- County: Nysa
- Gmina: Nysa

Population
  - Total: 780

Złotogłowice [zwɔtɔɡwɔˈvit͡sɛ] (German: Gross Neundorf) is a village in the administrative district of Gmina Nysa, within Nysa County, Opole Voivodeship, in south-western Poland.
