= Przełęk =

- Village
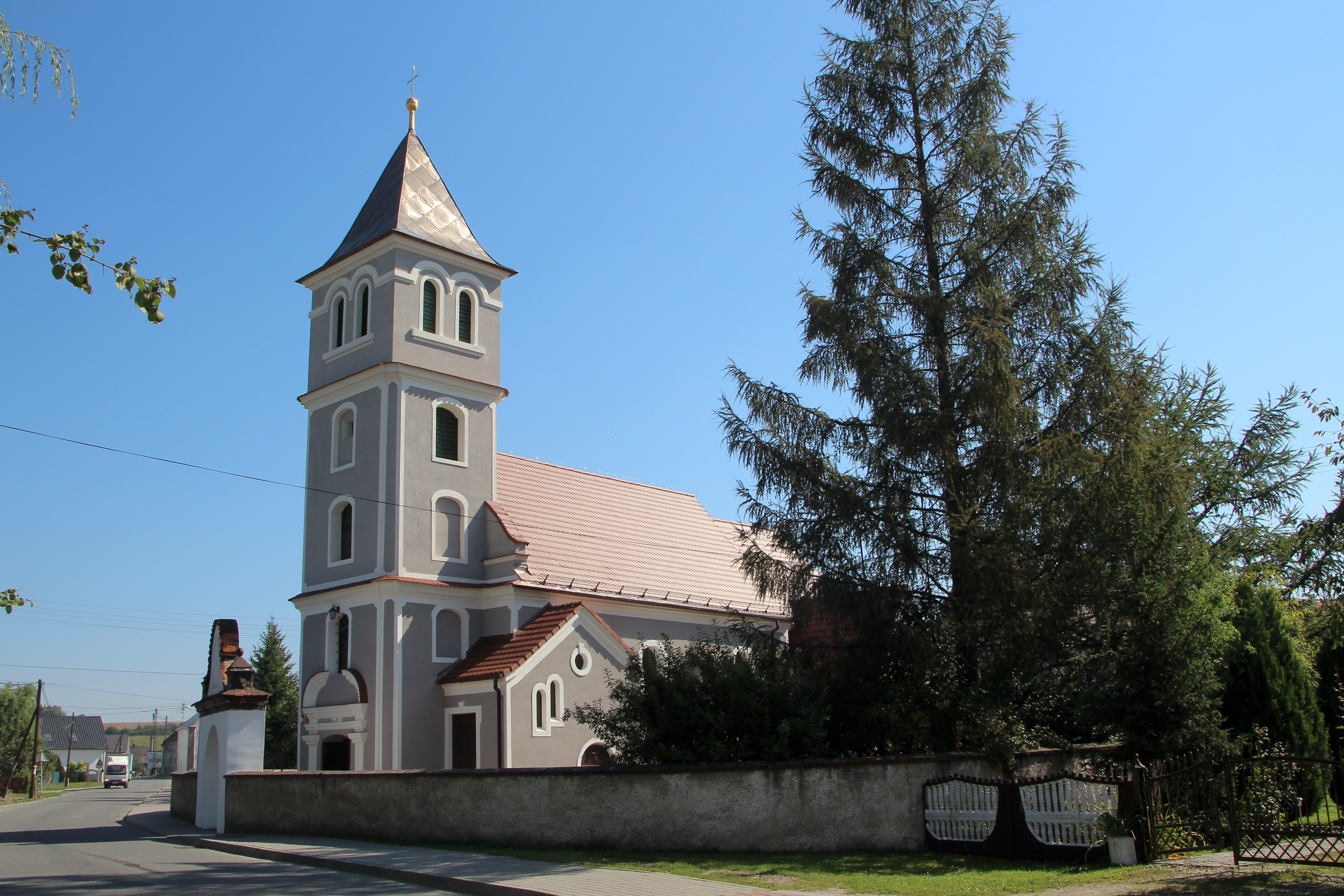

- Location within Poland
- Coordinates: 50°24′39″N 17°20′0″E
- Country: Poland
- Voivodeship: Opole
- County: Nysa
- Gmina: Nysa

Przełęk [ˈpʂɛwɛnk] (German: Preiland) is a village in the administrative district of Gmina Nysa, within Nysa County, Opole Voivodeship, in south-western Poland.
