= Kubice, Opole Voivodeship =

Kubice
- Village
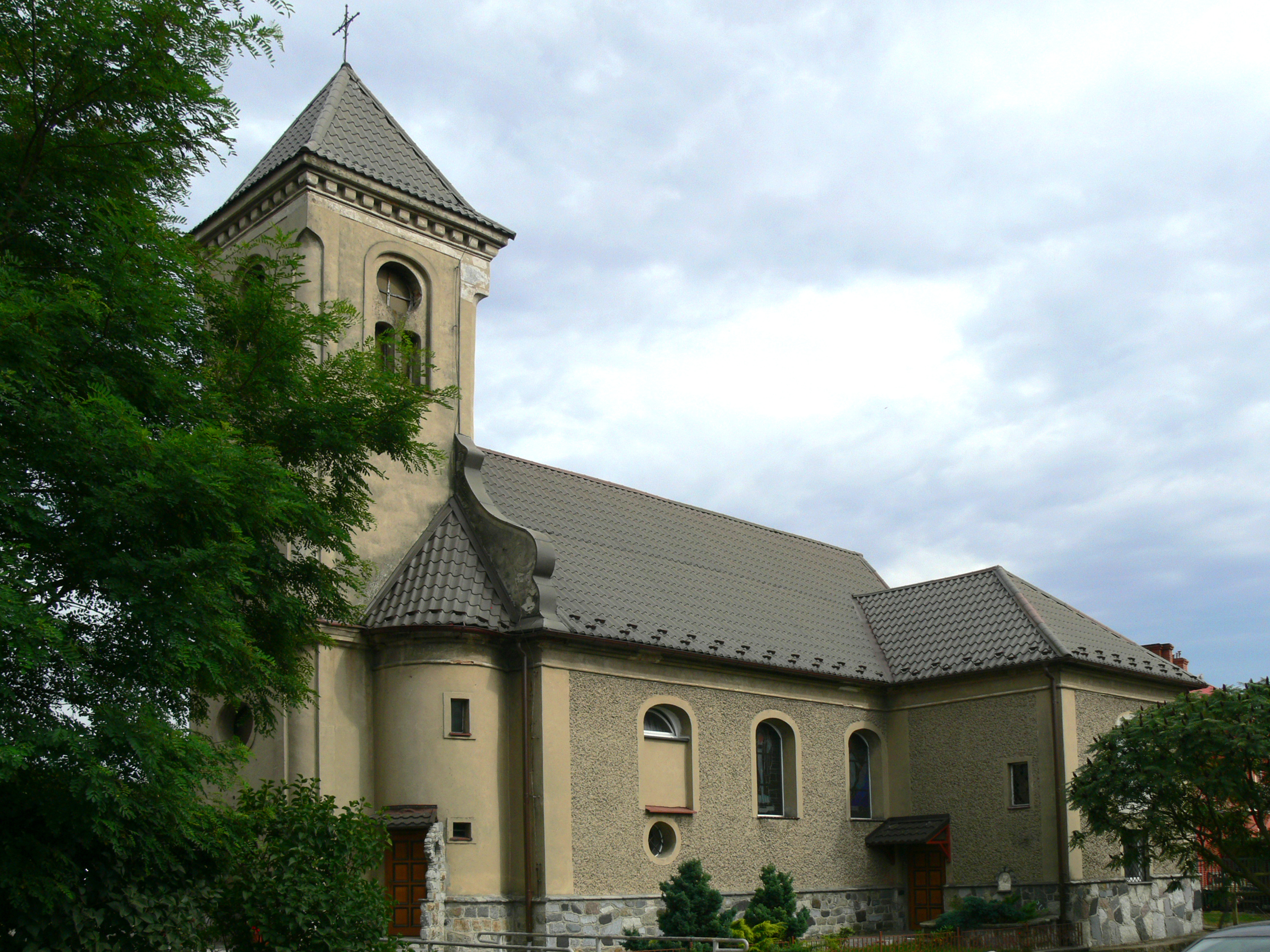
- Church of the Assumption

- Location within Poland
- Coordinates: 50°28′N 17°26′E
- Country: Poland
- Voivodeship: Opole
- County: Nysa
- Gmina: Nysa

Kubice [kuˈbit͡sɛ] (German: Kaundorf) is a village in the administrative district of Gmina Nysa, within Nysa County, Opole Voivodeship, in south-western Poland.
