= Utah State Route 41 =

State Route 41

Location
- Country: United States
- State: Utah

Highway system
- Utah State Highway System; Interstate; US; State; Minor; Scenic
← SR-40	→ SR-42

Utah State Route 41 may refer to:

- Utah State Route 41 (1968-2006), a former state highway in eastern Juab County, Utah, United States, that was essentially a western business loop off Interstate 15 through Nephi
- Utah State Route 41 (1927-1962), a former state highway designation (legislative overlay) for the former routing of U.S. Route 191 in northeastern Box Elder County, Utah, United States, running from Brigham City north to the Idaho state line (along what is now mostly Utah State Route 13)

== See also ==
- List of state highways in Utah
- List of U.S. Highways in Utah
- List of highways numbered 41
