= Konradowa =

- Village
- Location within Poland
- Coordinates: 50°29′N 17°23′E
- Country: Poland
- Voivodeship: Opole
- County: Nysa
- Gmina: Nysa

Konradowa [kɔnraˈdɔva] (German: Konradsdorf) is a village in the administrative district of Gmina Nysa, within Nysa County, Opole Voivodeship, in south-western Poland.
