= Jędrzychów, Opole Voivodeship =

Jędrzychów
- Village
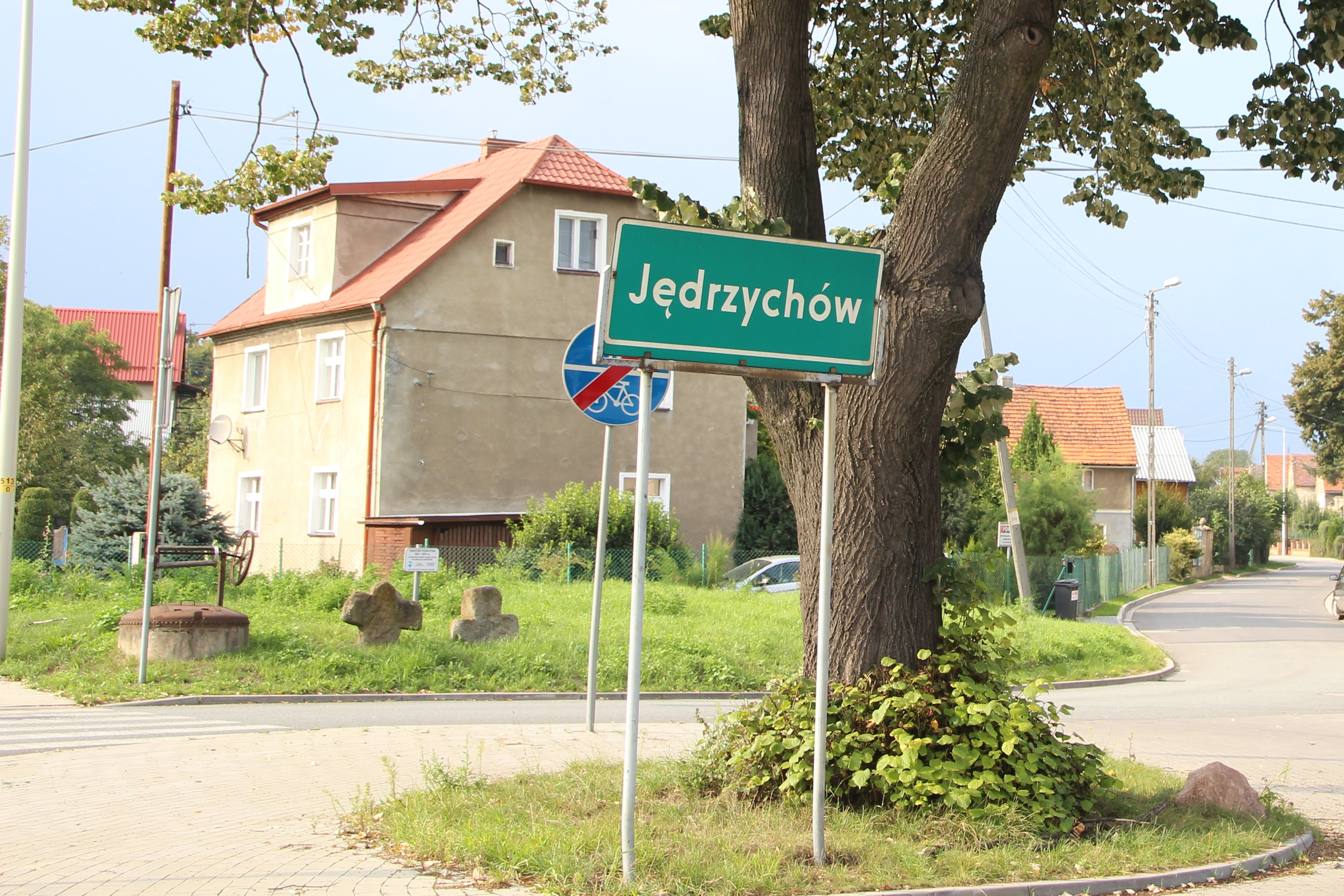

- Location within Poland
- Coordinates: 50°29′20″N 17°18′13″E
- Country: Poland
- Voivodeship: Opole
- County: Nysa
- Gmina: Nysa

Jędrzychów [jɛnˈdʐɨxuf] (German: Heidersdorf) is a village in the administrative district of Gmina Nysa, within Nysa County, Opole Voivodeship, in south-western Poland.
