= A41 =

A41 may refer to:

- A41, War Office Inventions Branch
- A41 (album), a studio album by All-4-One
- Queen's Pawn Game, Encyclopaedia of Chess Openings code
- Samsung Galaxy A41, a smartphone
- Vultee XA-41, an American World War II attack prototype

== Roads ==
- A41 road, a road connecting London and Birkenhead in England
- A41 autoroute, a road connecting Grenoble and the A40 in France
