= Siestrzechowice =

- Village
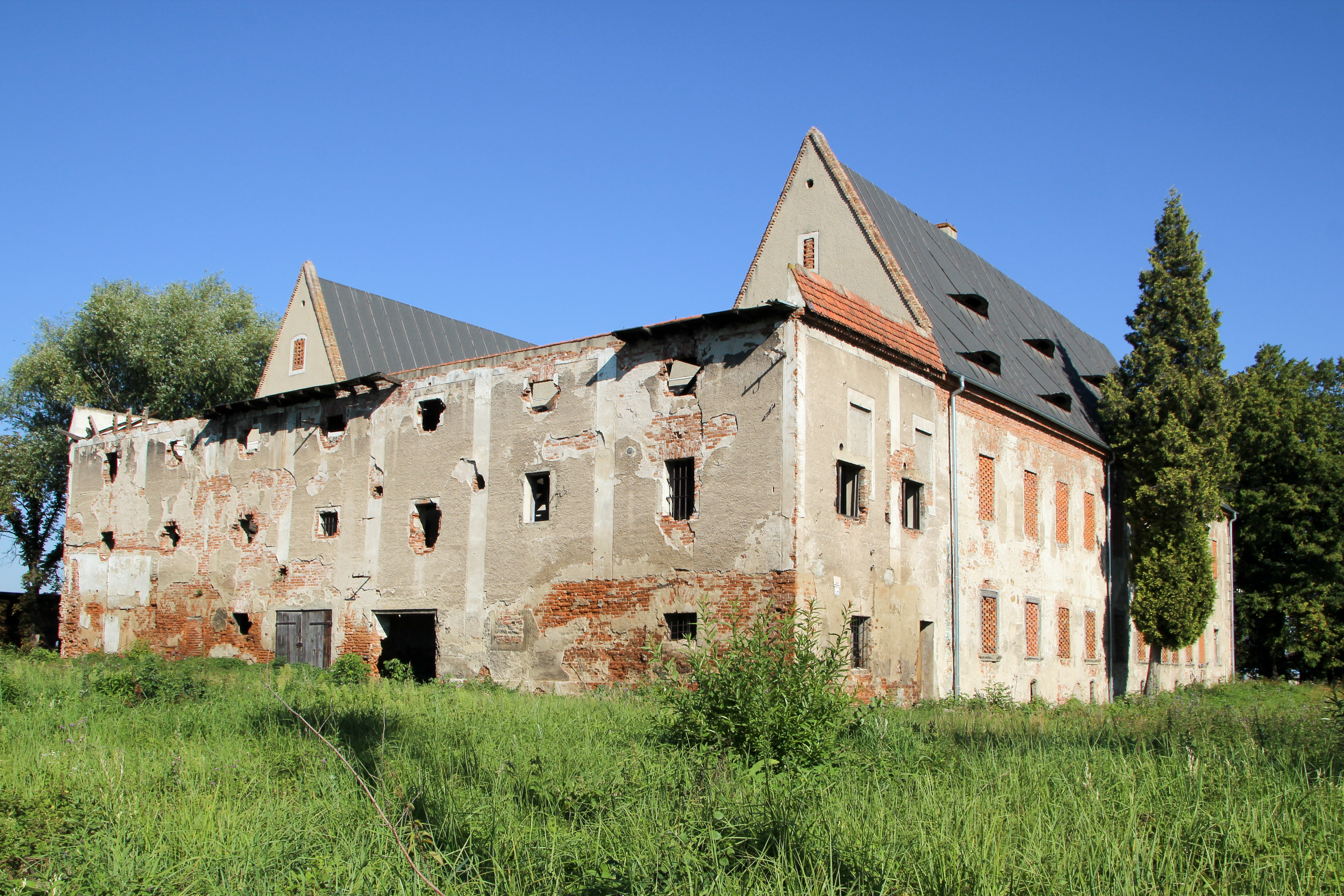
- Ruins of the palace

- Location within Poland
- Coordinates: 50°27′N 17°17′E
- Country: Poland
- Voivodeship: Opole
- County: Nysa
- Gmina: Nysa

Siestrzechowice [ɕɛstʂɛxɔˈvit͡sɛ] (German: Grunau) is a village in the administrative district of Gmina Nysa, within Nysa County, Opole Voivodeship, in south-western Poland. In the village is a palace, built near the end of the 16th century and now partly in ruins.
