= Kępnica =

- Village
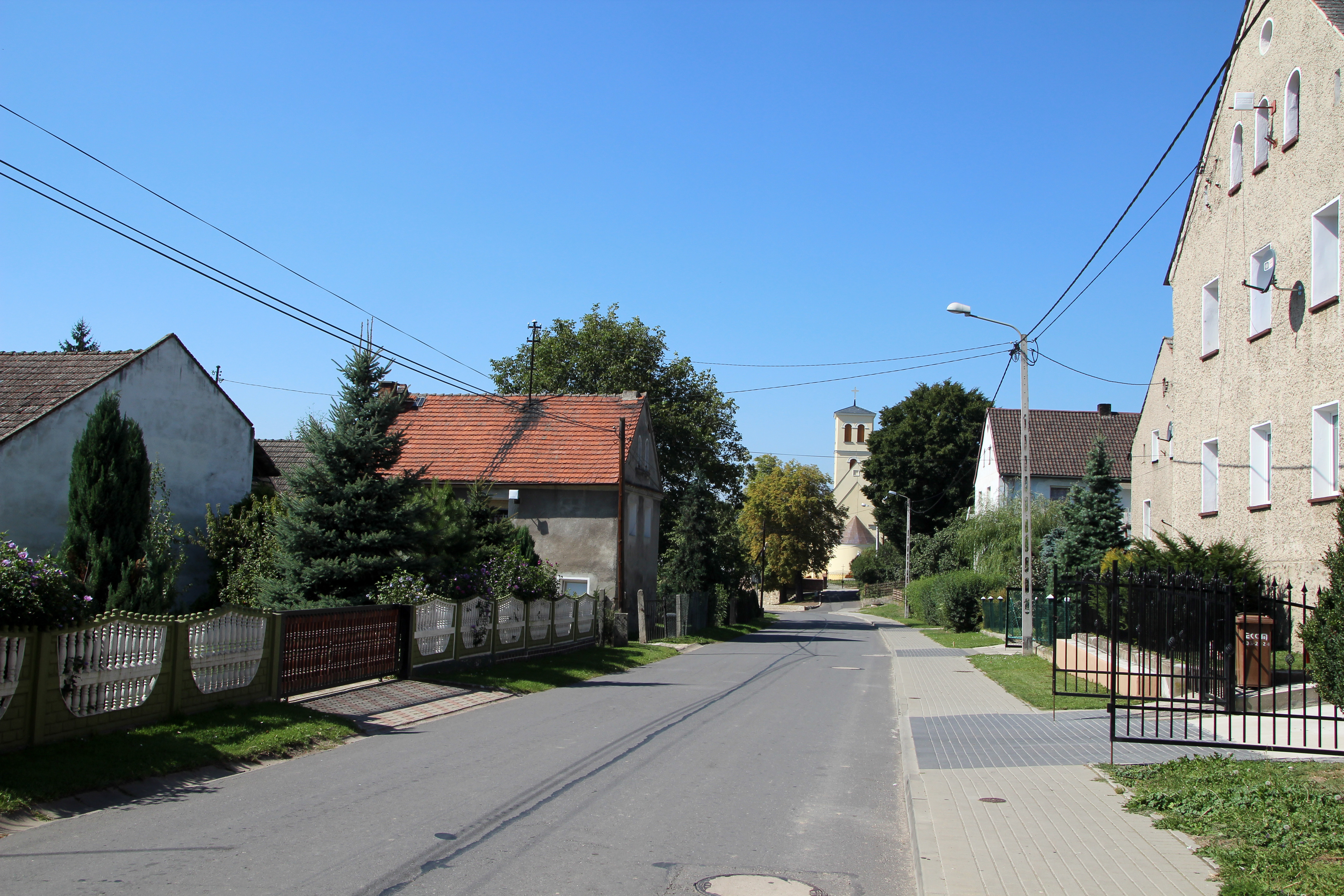

- Location within Poland
- Coordinates: 50°25′1″N 17°23′35″E
- Country: Poland
- Voivodeship: Opole
- County: Nysa
- Gmina: Nysa

Kępnica [kɛmpˈnit͡sa] (German: Deutsch Kamitz) is a village in the administrative district of Gmina Nysa, within Nysa County, Opole Voivodeship, in south-western Poland.
