= List of highways numbered 41A =

The following highways are numbered 41A:

== Canada ==
- Alberta Highway 41A
- Saskatchewan Highway 41A

== United States ==
- County Road 41A (Pasco County, Florida)
- Nebraska Spur 41A
- Nevada State Route 41A (former)
- New York State Route 41A
