= Koperniki =

- Village
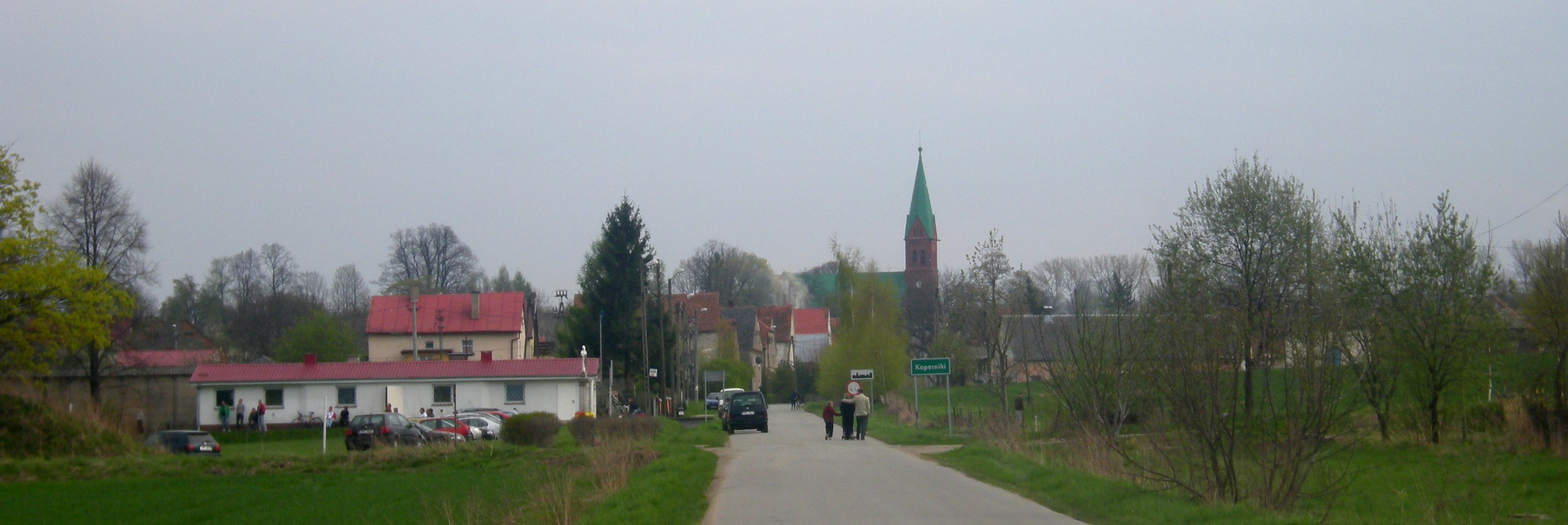
- General view

- Location within Poland
- Coordinates: 50°24′N 17°17′E
- Country: Poland
- Voivodeship: Opole
- County: Nysa
- Gmina: Nysa
- Time zone: UTC+1 (CET)
  - Summer (DST): UTC+2 (CEST)
- Area code: +48 77
- Car plates: ONY

Koperniki [kɔpɛrˈniki] (German: Köppernig) is a village in the administrative district of Gmina Nysa, within Nysa County, Opole Voivodeship, in southwestern Poland. It was the ancestral village of Nicolaus Copernicus, whose great-grandfather had moved to then Polish capital Kraków around 1380. The etymology of the name has been debated especially in the context of the biography of Copernicus, since at least the 1870s, surrounding two competing proposals, one suggesting the name root origin from the German word for copper (Kupfer), the other from the Polish word for dill (koper). The suffix -nik (or plural -niki) denotes a Slavic and Polish agent noun.

It is first mentioned in 1272, as Coprnih. and in 1284 was listed as one of 65 major German settlements in the Duchy of Nysa. As part of the Duchy of Nysa, it passed from the rule of Silesian branch of the Polish Piast dynasty to the Crown of Bohemia in 1342, and with Bohemia to the House of Habsburg in 1542. In 1742, it fell to Prussia as part of the settlement following the First Silesian War. In 1945, it became part of Poland, as Koperniki. The German population was displaced, and the village was re-populated with Polish settlers from Wiktorówka (Tarnopol Voivodeship) and Jeleśnia.
