= A41 autostrada (Poland) =

A41

Autostrada A41 - former official label for the northern part of the Kraków road bypass between 1999 and 2003/4. The road used to go from junction Balice to junction Kraków Radzikowskiego (which today is called Modlniczka), where it ended and connected to the contemporary national road 914 (today national road 79). Usually, this signage did not appear in road atlantes. Instead of using official numbering, many books described it as a "highway without number", a part of the S7 or national road 94. In the field, the highway was likely labeled as A4a.

As of today, this motorway is a part of expressway S52 and national road 7.
