= Wierzbięcice =

- Village
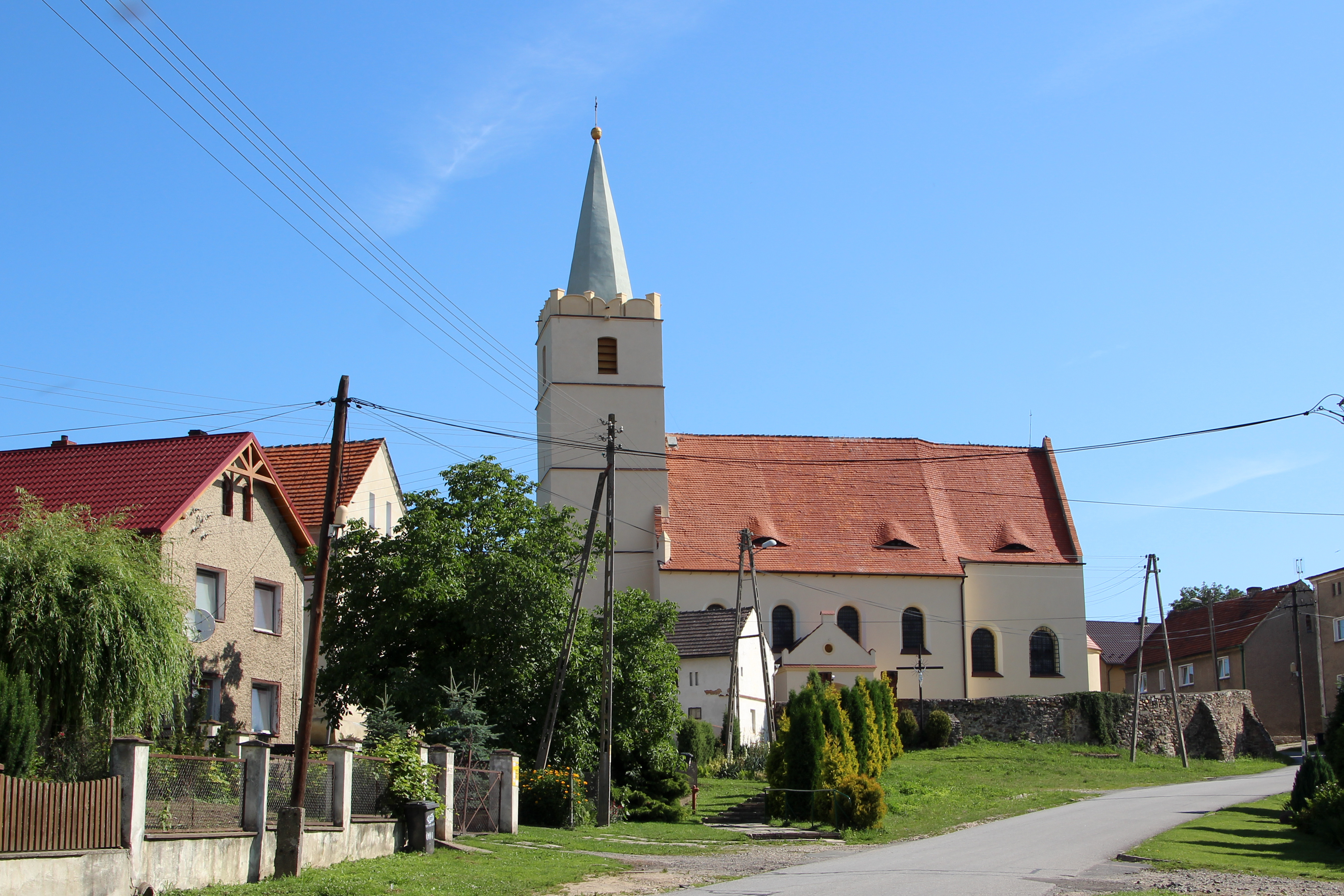
- Church of Saint Nicholas

- Location within Poland
- Coordinates: 50°26′N 17°26′E
- Country: Poland
- Voivodeship: Opole
- County: Nysa
- Gmina: Nysa

Wierzbięcice [vjɛʐbjɛnˈt͡ɕit͡sɛ] (German: Oppersdorf) is a village in the administrative district of Gmina Nysa, within Nysa County, Opole Voivodeship, in south-western Poland.
