= Rudolf Günsberg =

German chemist (1827–1879)

Herman Rudolf Günsberg (1827–1879) was a chemist from Pidkamin, near Brody, who distinguished himself by his fostering of the economic development of Galicia.

== Biography ==
He launched his academic career by completing a doctoral thesis at the University of Jena. Subsequently, he worked as an assistant professor at the Lviv Polytechnic in Lemberg between 1857 and 1868 and after that he started as the full Professor of Applied Chemistry at the same institution until 1879.

He published both in Polish and German several scientific written works relating to the organising of higher technical education, industrial chemistry and agricultural chemistry. Among his first articles worthy of notice are "Die Fachschule für chemische Technik an der K. K. Technischen Hochschule zu Lemberg" (1866, Szkoly techniczne), "Mysli odpowiedniego urzadzenia szkol technicznych" (1868) and "Die chemisch-technischen Fachschulen" (1869). His papers were presented in important central European, British, American and Scandinavian scientific journals particularly in the latter half of the 19th century.

He especially wrote about questions concerning industrial and agricultural chemistry in Austrian scientific journals like Berichte der Deutschen Chemischen Gesellschaft, Wiener Akademische Sitzungsberichte and Dingler's Polytechnic Journal. He wrote about the ammonia-soda process (Berichte der Deutschen Chemischen Gesellschaft, 1874), the analysis of the water of the Bronislaw Spring (Wiener Akademische Sitzungsberichte, 1861), of vegetable glue made of water-soluble grain (Wiener Akademische Sitzungsberichte, 1861), about the reactions of rubber with protein (Wiener Akademische Sitzungsberichte, 1862), of the structure of acetone (Wiener Akademische Sitzungsberichte, 1873) and about hydrocarbons (Dingler's Polytechnic Journal, 1873). His articles concerning agriculture were also published in the magazine called Rolnik in Lemberg between 1872 and 1873.

=== References and bibliography ===
- Cottam, Kazimiera Janina (1978). Boleslaw Limanowski, 1835-1935: a study in socialism and nationalism. East European quarterly. ISBN 9780914710349.
- The history of the Lviv Polytechnic (in Polish).
- Günsberg, Rudolph (1863). "Ueber das Verhalten von Gummin gegen Eiweisskörper". Journal für Praktische Chemie (in German). 88. Leipzig: Barth: 237. doi:10.1002/prac.18630880138 – via Google Books.
- Günsberg, Rudolph (1862). "Ueber die in Wasser löslichen Bestandtheile des Weizenklebers". Journal für Praktische Chemie (in German). 85. Leipzig: Barth: 213. doi:10.1002/prac.18620850123.
- Watts, Henry (1864). A Dictionary of Chemistry and the allied branches of other sciences. Longmans, Green, and co.
- Proceedings of the American Pharmaceutical Association at the annual meeting. Vol. 11. American Pharmaceutical Association. September 1863. p. 155.
- Knop, Wilhelm (1868). Der Kreislauf des Stoffs: Lehrbuch der Agricultur-Chemi (in German). Leipzig: Haessel. ISBN 9785876668738 – via Google Books.
- Wagner, Johannes Rudolf; Fischer, Ferdinand; Schmidt, Paul F.; Rassow, Berthold; Gottschalk, Friedrich (1863). Jahresbericht über die Leistungen der chemischen Technologie (in German). J. A. Barth – via Google Books.
- Günsberg, Rudolph (1861). "Über eine massanalytische Methode zur Bestimmung des Alkoholgehaltes in alkoholischen Zuckerlösungen". Sitzungsberichte der Kaiserlichen Akademie der Wissenschaften (in German) – via Google Books.
- Gascoigne, Robert Mortimer (1984). A historical catalogue of scientists and scientific books: from the earliest times to the close of the nineteenth century. Garland. ISBN 9780824089597.
- Royal Society (Great Britain), ed. (1925). Catalogue of scientific papers, (1800–1863). G. E. Eyre and W. Spottiswoode.
- Günsberg, Rudolf (1867). "Erfindung eins Verfahrens, aus dem Erdwachse Paraffin, Photogen, Maschinenschmieröl und Wagenschmiere darzustellen". Pharmazeutische Zentralhalle für Deutschland (in German). T. Steinkopff – via Google Books.
- Günsberg, Rudolf (1863). "On the Behavior of Dextrin and Gum Arabic toward Albumen". The American Journal of Science and Arts. S. Converse: 268 – via Google Books.
- Günsberg, Rudolf (1862). "Om Stivelsefabrikationen efter Martins Methode og Plantelimens Afbenyttelse som Naeringsmiddel for Mennesker og Dyr". Archiv for pharmaci og technisk chemi med deres grundvidenskaber (in Danish). Reitzel – via Google Books.
- Günsberg, Rudolf (1863). "Sur les réactions de l'albumine en présence de la gomme'". Journal de Pharmacie et de Chimie (in French) – via Google Books.
- Malaguti, Faustino Giovita Mariano (1868). Leçons élementaires de chimie (in French). Delagrave – via Google Books.
- Henle, J.; Keferstein, W.; Meissner, G. (1864). Bericht über die Fortschritte der Anatomie und Physiologie (in German). C.F. Winter – via Google Books.
- Gmelin, Leopold; Watts, Henry (1871). Hand-book of chemistry. Cavendish Society – via Google Books.
- Siemion, Ignacy Z. (1995). O chemikach polskich doby zaborów (in Polish). Wydawnictwo Uniwersytetu Wrocławskiego. ISBN 9788322911907 – via Google Books.
- Kenngott, Johann Gustav Adolf (1862). Uebersicht der Resultate mineralogi scher Forschungen in den Jahren 1844-1861 (in German). Engelmann – via Google Books.
