= Niwnica =

- Village
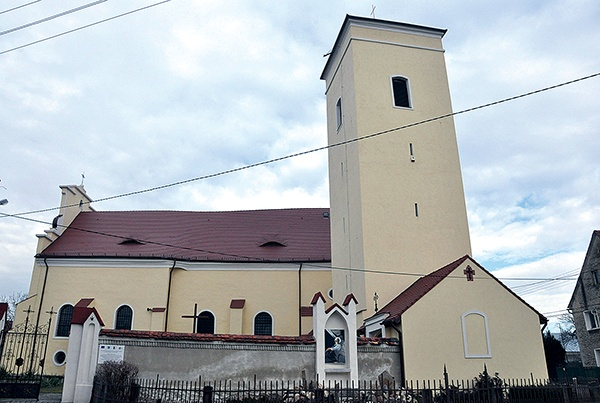
- Catholic church

- Location within Poland
- Coordinates: 50°27′N 17°25′E
- Country: Poland
- Voivodeship: Opole
- County: Nysa
- Gmina: Nysa

Niwnica [nivˈnit͡sa] (German: Neunz) is a village in the administrative district of Gmina Nysa, within Nysa County, Opole Voivodeship, in south-western Poland.
