= Behemoth discography =

Band discography

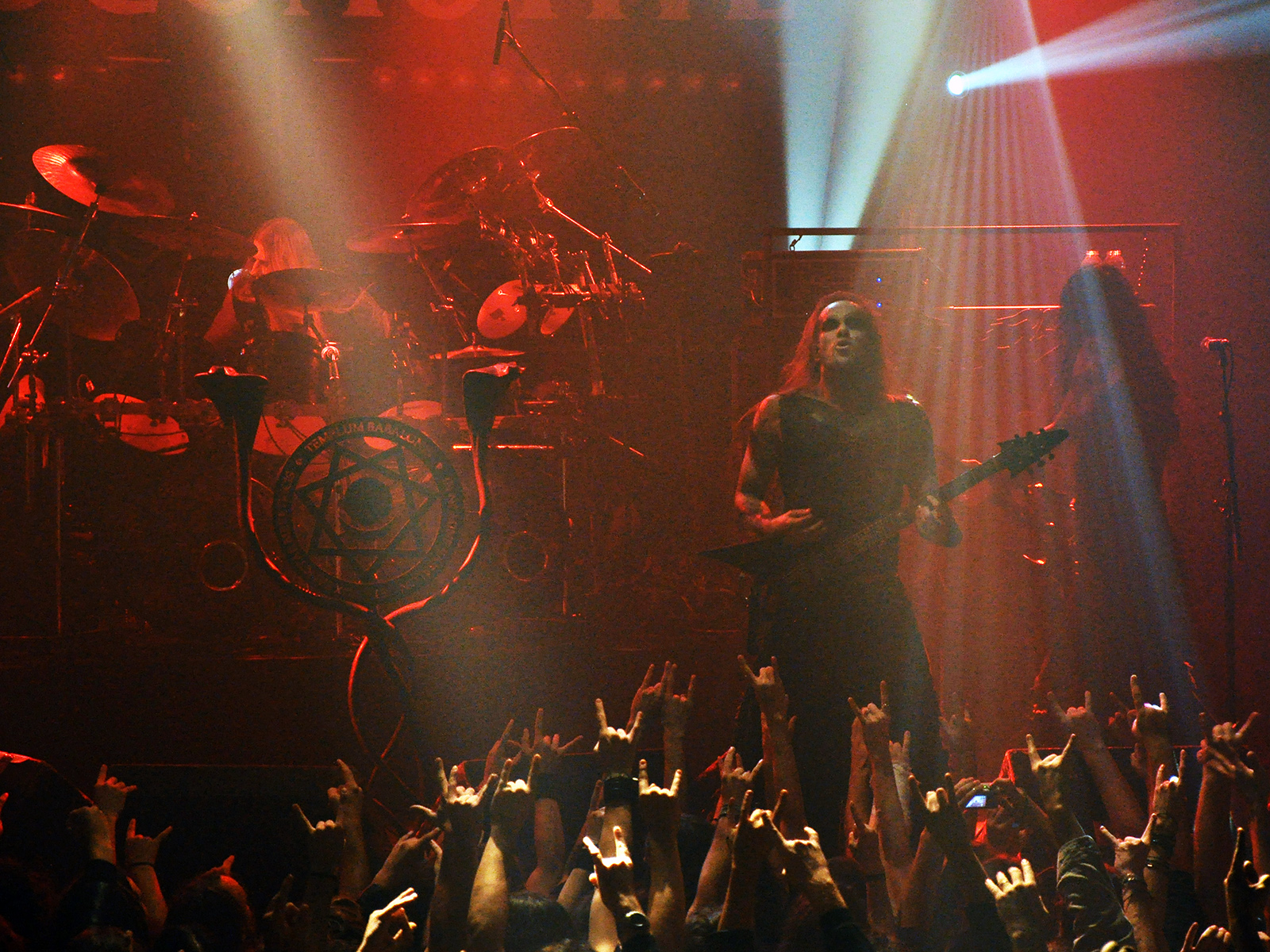
- Behemoth, 2009
- Studio albums: 13
- Extended plays: 11
- Live albums: 4
- Compilation albums: 2
- Video albums: 3
- Music videos: 29
- Demo albums: 4
- Other appearances: 4
- Split albums: 1

The discography of Behemoth, a Polish extreme metal band, consists of thirteen studio albums, four live albums, two compilation albums, eleven extended plays, three video albums, twenty-nine music videos, four demo albums, and one split album.

Formed by Nergal during mid-1991, Behemoth released their first record a year later with the rehearsal tape Endless Damnation, followed by the 1993 demos The Return of the Northern Moon, and …From the Pagan Vastlands. Later that year, Behemoth signed with the Italian independent record label Entropy and released the EP And the Forests Dream Eternally in 1994, followed by the debut full-length, 1995's Sventevith (Storming Near the Baltic). Behemoth signed a deal with Solistitium Records and released their second studio album, Grom in 1996. The third album, titled Pandemonic Incantations was released in 1998, the first with drummer Inferno. Later that year the group signed a record deal with label Avantgarde Music. The first album released was Satanica in 1999, followed by 2000's Thelema.6, and Zos Kia Cultus (Here and Beyond), issued in 2002. Behemoth signed a deal with Swedish label Regain Records in 2003, and later that year two members joined the band: bassist Orion, along with session guitarist Seth. With this new line-up they released Demigod in 2005, followed by 2007's The Apostasy, the first ever Behemoth album that did chart. It peaked at number 149 on the US Billboard.

== Albums ==
=== Studio albums ===
List of studio albums, with selected chart positions and certifications
Album details	Peak chart positions										Sales	Certifications
Album details	POL	AUT	BEL (FL)	CAN	FIN	GER	SWE	SWI	UK	US	Sales	Certifications
Sventevith (Storming Near the Baltic): Released: 3 April 1995; Label: Pagan	—	—	—	—	—	—	—	—	—	—		
Grom: Released: 2 January 1996; Label: Solistitium	—	—	—	—	—	—	—	—	—	—		
Pandemonic Incantations: Released: 2 March 1998; Label: Solistitium	—	—	—	—	—	—	—	—	—	—		
Satanica: Released: 25 October 1999; Label: Avantgarde Music	—	—	—	—	—	—	—	—	—	—		
Thelema.6: Released: 27 November 2000; Label: Avantgarde Music	31	—	—	—	—	—	—	—	—	—		
Zos Kia Cultus (Here and Beyond): Released: 28 October 2002; Label: Avantgarde Music	—	—	—	—	—	—	—	—	—	—		
Demigod: Released: 25 January 2005; Label: Century Media	15	—	—	—	—	—	—	—	—	—	US: 10,000 (as of 2005)	
The Apostasy: Released: 17 July 2007; Label: Century Media	9	—	—	—	—	—	—	—	—	149	US: 5,000 (as of 2007)	
Evangelion: Released: 11 August 2009; Label: Metal Blade	1	45	—	61	17	59	—	88	—	55	US: 8,500 (as of 2009)	ZPAV: Gold
The Satanist: Released: 4 February 2014; Label: Metal Blade	1	24	88	46	7	11	45	33	57	34	US: 10,225 (as of 2014)	
I Loved You at Your Darkest: Released: 5 October 2018; Label: Metal Blade	4	12	47	78	7	7	19	17	42	85	US: 10,925 (as of 2018)	
Opvs Contra Natvram: Released: 16 September 2022; Label: Nuclear Blast	1	14	38	—	8	13	16	14	—	—		
The Shit Ov God: Released: 9 May 2025; Label: Nuclear Blast	1	4	43	—	32	19	60	12	—	—		
"—" denotes a recording that did not chart or was not released in that territory.

=== Live albums ===
List of live albums, with selected chart positions
Album details	Peak chart positions	
Album details	GER	SWI
At the Arena ov Aion – Live Apostasy: Released: 14 October 2008; Label: Regain; Format: CD, LP, DD	—	—
Live Barbarossa: Released: 28 February 2014; Label: Nuclear Blast; Format: CD	—	—
Messe Noire: Released: 13 April 2018; Label: Nuclear Blast; Format: CD, LP, DVD, Blu-ray	27	—
In Absentia Dei: Released: 17 December 2021; Label: Nuclear Blast; Format: CD, LP, Blu-ray	27	60
XXX Years ov Blasphemy: Released: 25 October 2024; Label: Nuclear Blast; Format: CD, LP, Blu-ray	—	—
"—" denotes a recording that did not chart or was not released in that territory.

=== Compilation albums ===
Title	Album details
Demonica	Released: 10 July 2006; Label: Regain; Format: CD, LP, CS, DD
Abyssus Abyssum Invocat	Released: 16 May 2011; Label: Peaceville, Metal Blade; Format: CD, LP, DD

=== Split albums ===
Title	Album details	Note
And the Forests Dream Eternally/Forbidden Spaces	Released: 1997; Label: Last Episode, Vox Mortis; Format: CD, CS	split with Damnation

=== Demo albums ===
Title	Album details
Endless Damnation	Released: June 1992; Label: Self-released; Format: CS, LP
The Return of the Northern Moon	Released: January 1993; Label: Pagan; Format: CD, CS, LP
Thy Winter Kingdom	Released: June 1993; Label: Self-released; Format: CS
...From the Pagan Vastlands	Released: February 1994; Label: Pagan; Format: CD, CS, LP

== Extended plays ==
Title	EP details	Peak chart positions		Sales
Title	EP details	POL	US Heat.	Sales
And the Forests Dream Eternally	Released: 14 August 1995; Label: Entropy; Format: CD, CS	—	—	
Bewitching the Pomerania	Released: 19 September 1997; Label: Solistitium; Format: CD, CS	—	—	
Antichristian Phenomenon	Released: 4 December 2000; Label: Avantgarde Music; Format: CD, LP, CS	—	—	
Conjuration	Released: 13 September 2003; Label: Regain; Format: CD, LP, CS	—	—	
Slaves Shall Serve	Released: 20 October 2005; Label: Regain; Format: CD, LP, DD	—	—	US: 500+
Ezkaton	Released: 11 November 2008; Label: Regain; Format: CD, LP, DD	—	26	US: 1,600+
Blow Your Trumpets Gabriel	Released: 4 December 2013; Label: New Aeon Musick; Format: LP	—	—	
Xiądz	Released: 1 November 2014; Label: New Aeon Musick; Format: LP	—	—	
O Pentagram Ignis	Released: 26 September 2019; Label: New Aeon Musick; Format: LP	—	—	
A Forest	Released: 29 May 2020; Label: New Aeon Musick; Format: CD, LP, CS, DD	—	—	
I, Scvlptor	Released: 4 September 2026; Label: Nuclear Blast; Format: CD	1	—	
"—" denotes a recording that did not chart or was not released in that territory.

== Videography ==
=== Video albums ===
Title	Album details	Peak chart positions			Sales	Certifications
Title	Album details	FRA	US	CAN	Sales	Certifications
Live Eschaton	Released: July 2000; Label: Metal Mind; Format: VHS	—	—	—		
Crush.Fukk.Create: Requiem for Generation Armageddon	Released: 6 September 2004; Label: Regain; Format: DVD	—	—	—		
Evangelia Heretika	Released: 5 November 2010; Label: Nuclear Blast, Metal Blade; Format: DVD+CD, LP	22	15	12	POL: 10,000+; US: 1,000+	ZPAV: Platinum
"—" denotes a recording that did not chart or was not released in that territory.

=== Music videos ===
Title	Director(s)	Album	Year	Ref.
"Decade of Therion"	Unknown	Satanica	1999	
"Antichristian Phenomenon"	Roman Przylipiak	Thelema.6	2001	
"As Above So Below"	Kuba Miszczak	Zos Kia Cultus (Here and Beyond)	2003	
"Conquer All"	Joanna Rechnio	Demigod	2005	
"Slaves Shall Serve"	Joanna Rechnio	Demigod	2005	
"Prometherion"	Soren	The Apostasy	2007	
"At the Left Hand ov God"	Dariusz Szermanowicz, Grupa 13	The Apostasy	2008	
"Inner Sanctum"	Mateusz "Mania" Winkiel, Mania Studio	The Apostasy	2008	
"Ov Fire and the Void"	Dariusz Szermanowicz, Paweł Krawczyk, Grupa 13	Evangelion	2009	
"Alas, Lord Is Upon Me"	Dariusz Szermanowicz, Grupa 13	Evangelion	2010	
"Lucifer"	Dariusz Szermanowicz, Łukasz Tunikowski, Grupa 13	Evangelion	2011	
"Blow Your Trumpets Gabriel"	Grupa 13	The Satanist	2013	
"Ora Pro Nobis Lucifer"	Grupa 13	The Satanist	2014	
"Messe Noire"	Zev Deans, Panorama Programming	The Satanist	2015	
"The Satanist"	Andrzej Dragan	The Satanist	2015	
"Ben Sahar"	Sturla Viðar, Dariusz Szermanowicz, Adam 'Nergal' Darski	The Satanist	2016	
"O Father O Satan O Sun!"	N/A	The Satanist	2017	
''God = Dog''	Grupa 13	I Loved You at Your Darkest	2018	
"Wolves ov Siberia"	Kyle Kadow, Steven Cleavland	I Loved You at Your Darkest	2018	
"Bartzabel"	Grupa 13	I Loved You at Your Darkest	2018	
''Ecclesia Diabolica Catholica''	Grupa 13	I Loved You at Your Darkest	2019	
''Sabbath Mater''	Grupa 13	I Loved You at Your Darkest	2019	
''Rom 5:8''	Grupa 13	I Loved You at Your Darkest	2020	
''Ov My Herculean Exile''	Zuzanna Plisz	Opvs Contra Natvram	2022	
''Off to War!''	Påhl Sundström, Erik Sundström	Opvs Contra Natvram	2022	
''The Deathless Sun''	Błażej Jankowiak	Opvs Contra Natvram	2022	
''Thy Becoming Eternal''	Unknown	Opvs Contra Natvram	2022	
''Versvs Christvs''	Agata Alexander	Opvs Contra Natvram	2022	
''Once Upon a Pale Horse''	Grupa13	Opvs Contra Natvram	2023	

== Other appearances ==
Title	Notes
"Ostatni Tabor"	Year: 1996; Album: Czarne Zastępy: W Hołdzie Kat
"Carnage"	Year: 2001; Album: Originators of the Northern Darkness – A Tribute to Mayhem
"Day of Suffering"	Year: 2002; Album: Tyrants from the Abyss: A Tribute to Morbid Angel
"Force Fed the Excrements of Satan"	Year: 2015; Album: Anthology: A Tribute to Sewer Music

== Bibliography ==
- Dunaj, Lukasz (2004). Crush.Fukk.Create: Requiem for Generation Armageddon (DVD booklet). Behemoth. São Paulo, Brazil: Hellion Records. pp. 7–13. HELDVD381AB.
