= Xiądz =

EP by Behemoth
- Released: 1 November 2014
- Recorded: February–May 2009 at Radio Gdańsk in Gdańsk; February–June 2013 at Hertz Studio in Białystok; RG Studio in Gdańsk
- Genre: Black metal, death metal
- Language: English, Polish
- Label: New Aeon Musick
- Producer: Behemoth, Wojciech & Sławomir Wiesławscy, Daniel Bergstrand

Behemoth chronology
Live Barbarossa (2014)	Xiądz (2014)	Messe Noire (2018)

Xiądz is the eighth EP by Polish extreme metal band Behemoth. It was released on 1 November 2014 through New Aeon Musick in a limited edition of 2,000 copies; all copies were hand numbered by the band. The EP features three tracks, including "Nieboga Czarny Xiądz" from The Satanist recording session, "Towards the Dying Sun We March" from Evangelion recording session, along with re-recorded "Moonspell Rites", originally released in 1994 on And the Forests Dream Eternally EP. The title is of the old Polish language that translates to 'Priest'.

== Track listing ==
No.	Title	Lyrics	Music	Length
1.	"Nieboga Czarny Xiądz"	Nergal	Nergal	6:05
2.	"Moonspell Rites"	Nergal	Nergal	7:02
3.	"Towards the Dying Sun We March"	Nergal	Nergal	6:58

== Personnel ==
Behemoth

- Adam "Nergal" Darski – lead guitar, vocals
- Tomasz "Orion" Wróblewski – bass
- Zbigniew Robert "Inferno" Promiński – drums, percussion

Production

- Ted Jensen – mastering (1–3)
- Daniel Bergstrand – producer (1, 2), drums producing (3)
- Matt Hyde – audio mixing (1, 2)
- Colin Richardson – audio mixing (3)
- Arkadiusz "Malta" Malczewski – sound engineering (3)
- Kuba Mańkowski – sound engineering (3)
- Jan Bryt – solos and vocals tracking (3)
- Wojciech Wiesławski – engineering, producer (1, 2), guitars co-producing (3)
- Sławomir Wiesławski – engineering, producer (1, 2), guitars co-producing (3)
- Denis Forkas – cover design and artwork

Additional musicians

- Patryk Dominik "Seth" Sztyber – rhythm guitar
- Michał Łapaj (Riverside) – keyboards, hammond organ on "Nieboga Czarny Xiądz"

Note

- Recorded at Hertz Studio in Białystok, Poland, Feb–June 2013 (1, 2)
- Mixed at Hydeaway Studio, Los Angeles, Aug–Sept 2013 (1, 2)
- Mastered at Sterling Sound, New York City, Sept–Oct 2013 (1, 2)
- Recorded at RG Studios, Jan–May 2009 (3)
- Mixed at Musikbox, Miloco Studios, London, May 2009 (3)
- Mastered in Sterling Studio, New York, May 2009 (3)
