= Blow Your Trumpets Gabriel =

EP by Behemoth
- Released: 4 December 2013
- Recorded: February–June 2013
- Studio: Hertz Studio in Białystok and RG Studio in Gdańsk
- Genre: Blackened death metal
- Length: 12:03
- Label: New Aeon Musick
- Producer: Behemoth; Wojciech Wiesławski; Sławomir Wiesławski; Daniel Bergstrand

Behemoth chronology
Abyssus Abyssum Invocat (2011)	Blow Your Trumpets Gabriel (2013)	The Satanist (2014)

Professional ratings
Review scores
Source	Rating
Fearnet	favorable

Blow Your Trumpets Gabriel is the seventh EP by Polish extreme metal band Behemoth. It was released on 4 December 2013 through the band's record label New Aeon Musick. Blow Your Trumpets Gabriel was limited to 2000 copies, available only through Behemoth Webstore and Nuclear Blast Store, most copies bought through Behemoth's webstore were signed by the band. The EP features three tracks, including title song, and two non-album tracks "If I Were Cain", along with cover of Siekiera's "Ludzie wschodu".

== Track listing ==
No.	Title	Lyrics	Music	Length
1.	"Blow Your Trumpets Gabriel"	Nergal	Nergal	4:25
2.	"If I Were Cain"	Nergal	Nergal	3:27
3.	"Ludzie Wschodu" (Siekiera cover)	Tomasz Adamski	Adamski	4:11
Total length:				12:03

== Personnel ==
Behemoth

- Adam "Nergal" Darski – vocals, guitars
- Tomasz "Orion" Wróblewski – bass guitar
- Zbigniew Robert "Inferno" Promiński – drums and percussion

Additional musicians

- Patryk Dominik "Seth" Sztyber – guitars
- Michał Łapaj (Riverside) – keyboards, hammond organ on "If I Were Cain"

Production

- Ted Jensen – mastering
- Daniel Bergstrand – producer
- Matt Hyde – audio mixing
- Wojciech Wiesławski – engineering, producer
- Sławomir Wiesławski – engineering, producer
- Denis Forkas – cover design and artwork

Note

- Recorded at Hertz Studio in Białystok, Poland, Feb–June 2013
- Mixed at Hydeaway Studio, Los Angeles, Aug–Sept 2013
- Mastered at Sterling Sound, New York City, Sept–Oct 2013

== Release history ==
Region	Date	Label
Poland	4 December 2013	New Aeon Musick
