= Ov Fire and the Void =

Single by Behemoth

from the album Evangelion
- Released: July 19, 2009 (Europe); August 11, 2009 (United States)
- Recorded: February 16, 2009 – May 2009 at Radio Gdańsk in Gdańsk, Poland
- Genre: Blackened death metal
- Length: 4:28
- Label: Metal Blade; Nuclear Blast
- Songwriter(s): Nergal
- Producer(s): Daniel Bergstrand; Wojciech Wiesławski; Sławomir Wiesławski

"Ov Fire and the Void" is a song by the extreme metal band Behemoth from their 2009 album Evangelion. The lyrics are inspired by Max Stirner's philosophy. When the first demo versions were recorded, Adarm "Nergal" Darski shared how he perceived the aural essence:

Whilst listening to the first demo versions of this track I had an irresistible feeling that every single tone is filled with overwhelming spirit of Dionysus; god of ecstatic chaos, source of pure joy which reaches far beyond false boundaries between good and evil, life and death, love and hate. Dionysian rave focuses entirely on Here and Now, experiential knowledge, intuition and passion. All of these are essential factors or components of any form of Art. The world governed by such virtues cannot be corrupted or repressed by an order which every culture or civilization tries to force on. In its nature it is much more primordial and pure. The same can be said about a creative chaos; it goes beyond any sort of intellectual analysis or speculation. It becomes released energy. Potential in action, never in inertia. Let us joy for we are as streams of lava erupting under our oceanic and cosmic Will.

— Nergal

== Music video ==
=== Recording and production ===
The video for Ov Fire and the Void was filmed by Grupa 13 in Wrocław, Poland and was directed by Dariusz Szermanowicz. Both parties had previously worked on the video for At The Left Hand Ov God. Behemoth began working on the project in early July 2009 and they aimed to have its premiere in late July / early August, just preceding the release of Evangelion.

While filming the video in July, the band wanted to keep their fans informed by filming and posting behind the scene material.

It was a natural choice for us to work with Grupa 13 again. They did amazing work for us in the past and we knew we could do something even more spectacular this time. [...] In At The Left Hand Ov God, despite being more modern, the new clip contains biblical references. The final scene showing the band with an angel and what happens to it at the end is about to cause much consternation.

— Nergal

On July 30 the trailer aired on YouTube, offering a glimpse into the theme of the video, followed by the premiere of the final video also on YouTube on August 6, just before the release of their album Evangelion which was released on August 7 in Europe.

=== Censorship ===
On August 7, 2009, a day after the premiere of the video, the uncensored version of the video was removed from YouTube, causing a backlash from fans. The band uploaded a censored version of the video in response, and re-uploaded the original version to their Metal Blade page using Vimeo.
