= Crush.Fukk.Create: Requiem for Generation Armageddon =

Video by Behemoth
- Released: 6 September 2004
- Genre: Death metal; black metal
- Length: 1:19:27
- Language: English, Polish
- Label: Regain Records
- Producer: Alfred Sosgórnik, Adam "Nergal" Darski, Tomasz "Orion" Wróblewski

Behemoth chronology
Conjuration (2003)	Crush.Fukk.Create: Requiem for Generation Armageddon (2004)	Demigod (2004)

Professional ratings
Review scores
Source	Rating
Chronicles of Chaos	7.5/10 stars

Crush.Fukk.Create: Requiem for Generation Armageddon is the second video album by Polish extreme metal band Behemoth.

== Track listing ==
=== Disc 1 ===
Live Pandemonium – Live at Party San Festival 2003
No.	Title	Lyrics	Music	Length
1.	"Antichristian Phenomenon"	Nergal	Nergal	06:04
2.	"From the Pagan Vastlands"	Tomasz Krajewski	Nergal	03:40
3.	"Heru Ra Ha (Let There Be Might)"	Nergal, Krzysztof Azarewicz	Nergal	03:19
4.	"Christians to the Lions"	Nergal	Nergal	03:07
5.	"Hekau 718"	Azarewicz	Trotzky, Nergal	00:48
6.	"No Sympathy for Fools"	Nergal	Nergal, Havoc	03:58
7.	"Decade ov Therion"	Azarewicz	Nergal	03:11
8.	"As Above So Below"	Azarewicz	Nergal	05:50
9.	"Chant for Eskhaton 2000"	Azarewicz	Nergal	06:05
10.	"Pure Evil and Hate"	Nergal	Nergal	03:22

Mother Khaoz on Stage – Live at Mystic Festival 2001
No.	Title	Lyrics	Music	Length
1.	"Christians to the Lions"	Nergal	Nergal	3:50
2.	"Decade ov Therion"	Krzysztof Azarewicz	Nergal	3:51
3.	"From the Pagan Vastlands"	Tomasz Krajewski	Nergal	3:44
4.	"Antichristian Phenomenon"	Nergal	Nergal	4:56
5.	"LAM"	Azarewicz	Nergal	4:10
6.	"Satan's Sword"	Nergal	Nergal	4:12
7.	"Chant for Eskhaton"	Azarewicz	Nergal	6:31

Music videos
No.	Title	Lyrics	Music	Length
1.	"As Above So Below"	Krzysztof Azarewicz	Nergal	5:03
2.	"Christians to the Lions"	Nergal	Nergal	3:46

=== Disc 2 ===
Speak with the Devil (documentary)
No.	Title	Length
1.	"Interview and introduction to selected episodes by Nergal"
2.	"The past is like a funeral..."
3.	"X-Mass festivals"
4.	"Italian affair"
5.	"First headlining experience"
6.	"Poland"
7.	"Barbarossa east tour"
8.	"Mexican episode"
9.	"European crusade"
10.	"Album production and studio scenes"
11.	"Conquering US and other stuff..."

== Personnel ==
- Adam "Nergal" Darski – lead vocals, rhythm guitar, production
- Mateusz "Havoc" Śmierzchalski – lead guitar, backing vocals
- Marcin "Novy" Nowak – bass, backing vocals (Live at Mystic Festival 2001)
- Tomasz "Orion" Wróblewski – bass, backing vocals (Live at Party San Festival 2003), production
- Zbigniew "Inferno" Promiński – drums
- Tomasz "Graal" Daniłowicz – cover art
- Łukasz Dunaj – band biography
- Arkadiusz "Malta" Malczewski – sound engineering
- Alfred Sosgórnik – production
- Rafał "Brovar" Brauer – technician
- Melissa – translations

== Release history ==
Region	Date	Label
Sweden	6 September 2004	Regain Records
UK	3 May 2005	Candlelight Records
US	31 May 2005	Candlelight Records
