= Conjuration (EP) =

EP by Behemoth
- Released: 14 September 2003
- Recorded: June–September 2002
- Genre: Blackened death metal
- Length: 29:40
- Label: Regain
- Producer: Adam "Nergal" Darski

Behemoth chronology
Zos Kia Cultus (Here and Beyond) (2002)	Conjuration (2003)	Crush.Fukk.Create: Requiem for Generation Armageddon (2004)

Alternative cover
- US edition cover art

Professional ratings
Review scores
Source	Rating
Teraz Rock	4/5 stars

Conjuration is the fourth EP by Polish extreme metal band Behemoth. The first three tracks were recorded between June and September 2002. The live songs were recorded at the Mystic Festival on 13 October 2001. The tracks were then mastered at the High End Studio in June 2003.

In 2011, the EP (along with several previously unreleased live tracks) was bundled with Slaves Shall Serve and released as part of the compilation album Abyssus Abyssum Invocat.

== Track listing ==
No.	Title	Lyrics	Music	Length
1.	"Conjuration ov Sleep Daemons"	Krzysztof Azarewicz	Nergal	3:24
2.	"Wish" (Nine Inch Nails cover)	Trent Reznor	Trent Reznor	3:37
3.	"Welcome to Hell" (Venom cover)	Abaddon, Cronos, Mantas	Abaddon, Cronos, Mantas	3:15
4.	"Christians to the Lions" (live)	Nergal	Nergal	3:49
5.	"Decade ov Therion" (live)	Krzysztof Azarewicz	Nergal	3:47
6.	"Antichristian Phenomenon" (live)	Nergal	Nergal	5:03
7.	"Chant for Eschaton 2000" (live)	Krzysztof Azarewicz	Nergal	6:45
Total length:				29:40

== Personnel ==
Behemoth

- Adam "Nergal" Darski – vocals, guitars, production, mix
- Mateusz "Havoc" Śmierzchalski – guitars
- Zbigniew "Inferno" Promiński – drums

Additional musicians

- Marcin "Novy" Nowak – bass guitar

Production

- Arkadiusz "Malta" Malczewski – engineering, mix
- Grzegorz Piwkowski – mastering
- Tomasz "Graal" Daniłowicz – cover art

Note

- Tracks 1 to 3 recorded between June and September 2002, Hendrix Studios, Lublin, Poland
- Tracks 4 to 7 recorded live at Mystic Festival on 13 October 2001.
- Mastered in June 2003 at High End Studio, Warsaw, Poland.

== Release history ==
Region	Date	Label
Sweden, Poland, USA	14 September 2003	Regain Records, Mystic Production, Olympic Recordings/Century Media Records
