= Evangelia Heretika =

Video by Behemoth
- Released: 5 November 2010
- Genres: Death metal; black metal
- Length: 300:00
- Languages: English, Polish
- Labels: Nuclear Blast, Metal Blade, Mystic

Behemoth chronology
Evangelion (2009)	Evangelia Heretika (2010)	Abyssus Abyssum Invocat (2011)

Professional ratings
Review scores
Source	Rating
Blabbermouth.net	8/10 stars
Teraz Rock	4/5 stars

Evangelia Heretika is the third video album by Polish extreme metal band Behemoth. It was released on 9 November 2010.

On 13 March 2011 Evangelia Heretika was certified platinum in Poland.

== Track listing ==
=== Disc 1 ===
Live in Warsaw 2009 (25 September 2009, Stodoła, Warsaw)
No.	Title	Lyrics	Music	Length
1.	"Intro" (instrumental)		Nergal	2:32
2.	"Ov Fire and the Void"	Nergal	Nergal	4:53
3.	"Demigod"	Nergal	Nergal	3:48
4.	"Pan Satyros"	Nergal, Krzysztof Azarewicz	Nergal	4:54
5.	"Shemhamforash"	Nergal	Nergal	4:22
6.	"Conquer All"	Nergal	Nergal	4:29
7.	"Decade Ov Therion"	Azarewicz	Nergal	3:21
8.	"Wolves Guard My Coffin"	Nergal	Nergal	4:29
9.	"Christians to the Lions"	Nergal	Nergal	3:47
10.	"At the Left Hand Ov God"	Nergal, Azarewicz	Nergal	5:13
11.	"Slaves Shall Serve"	Azarewicz	Nergal	4:03
12.	"As Above So Below"	Azarewicz	Nergal	5:00
13.	"Drum Solo" (instrumental)		Inferno	1:18
14.	"Lam"	Azarewicz	Nergal	5:18
15.	"Alas, Lord Is Upon Me"	Nergal	Nergal	3:50
16.	"Antichristian Phenomenon"	Nergal	Nergal	5:15
17.	"Chant For Ezkaton 2000 E.V."	Azarewicz	Nergal	6:34
18.	"Lucifer"	Tadeusz Miciński	Nergal	8:22

Live in Paris 2008 (17 February 2008, La Locomotive, Paris)
No.	Title	Lyrics	Music	Length
1.	"Rome 64 C.E." (instrumental)		Nergal	1:34
2.	"Slaying the Prophets ov Isa"	Nergal	Nergal	3:38
3.	"Antichristian Phenomenon"	Nergal	Nergal	4:16
4.	"Demigod"	Nergal	Nergal	3:34
5.	"From the Pagan Vastlands"	Tomasz Krajewski	Nergal	3:59
6.	"Conquer All"	Nergal	Nergal	4:16
7.	"Prometherion"	Nergal	Nergal	3:13
8.	"Drum Solo" (instrumental)		Inferno	1:16
9.	"Slaves Shall Serve"	Azarewicz	Nergal	3:48
10.	"As Above So Below"	Azarewicz	Nergal	4:56
11.	"At the Left Hand ov God"	Nergal, Azarewicz	Nergal	5:59
12.	"Summoning ov the Ancient Ones"	Nergal	Nergal	3:57
13.	"Christgrinding Avenue"	Nergal	Nergal	4:29
14.	"Christians to the Lions"	Nergal	Nergal	3:42
15.	"Sculpting the Throne ov Seth"	Nergal	Nergal	4:13
16.	"Decade ov Therion"	Azarewicz	Nergal	3:10
17.	"Chant for Ezkaton 2000 e.v."	Azarewicz	Nergal	7:07
18.	"I Got Erection" (Turbonegro cover)			3:23
19.	"Pure Evil & Hate"	Nergal	Nergal	4:27

=== Disc 2 ===
Documentaries
No.	Title	Directed and produced	Length
1.	"Evangelia Nova"	Fabryczna Art Film Group	56:51
2.	"De Arte Heretika"	Kuba Mańkowski & Behemoth	55:45

Music videos
No.	Title	Directed and produced	Length
1.	"Decade Ov Therion"	Lucjan Hirszmajer
2.	"As Above So Below"	Jakub Miszczak
3.	"Conquer All"	Joanna Rechnio
4.	"Slaves Shall Serve"	Joanna Rechnio
5.	"Prometherion"	Soren
6.	"At the Left Hand Ov God"	Dariusz Szermanowicz
7.	"Inner Sanctum"	Mateusz "Mania" Winkiel
8.	"Ov Fire and the Void"	Dariusz Szermanowicz
9.	"Alas, Lord Is Upon Me"	Dariusz Szermanowicz
10.	"Making of Prometherion"	Kuba Mańkowski, Sounds Great Promotion Studio
11.	"Making of at the Left Hand Ov God"	Grupa 13
12.	"Making of Inner Sanctum"	Mania Studio
13.	"Making of Ov Fire and the Void"	Grupa 13
14.	"Making of Alas, Lord Is Upon Me"	Grupa 13

=== CD ===
Live in Warsaw 2009 (25 September 2009, Stodoła, Warsaw, Poland)
No.	Title	Lyrics	Music	Length
1.	"Intro" (instrumental)		Nergal	2:32
2.	"Ov Fire and the Void"	Nergal	Nergal	4:53
3.	"Demigod"	Nergal	Nergal	3:48
4.	"Pan Satyros"	Nergal, Krzysztof Azarewicz	Nergal	4:54
5.	"Shemhamforash"	Nergal	Nergal	4:22
6.	"Conquer All"	Nergal	Nergal	4:29
7.	"Decade Ov Therion"	Azarewicz	Nergal	3:21
8.	"Wolves Guard My Coffin"	Nergal	Nergal	4:29
9.	"Christians to the Lions"	Nergal	Nergal	3:47
10.	"At the Left Hand Ov God"	Nergal, Azarewicz	Nergal	5:13
11.	"Slaves Shall Serve"	Azarewicz	Nergal	4:03
12.	"As Above So Below"	Azarewicz	Nergal	5:00
13.	"Drum Solo" (instrumental)		Inferno	1:18
14.	"Lam"	Azarewicz	Nergal	5:18
15.	"Alas, Lord Is Upon Me"	Nergal	Nergal	3:50
16.	"Antichristian Phenomenon"	Nergal	Nergal	5:15
17.	"Chant for Ezkaton 2000 E.V."	Azarewicz	Nergal	6:34
18.	"Lucifer"	Tadeusz Miciński	Nergal	8:22

== Personnel ==
Behemoth

- Adam "Nergal" Darski – lead vocals, rhythm guitar
- Zbigniew "Inferno" Promiński – drums, percussion
- Tomasz "Orion" Wróblewski – bass, backing vocals, co-lead vocals on "Wolves Guard my Coffin" and "At the Left Hand of God"

Additional musicians

- Patryk "Seth" Sztyber – lead guitar, backing vocals

== Release history ==
Region	Date	Label
Poland, Europe	5 November 2010	Mystic Production, Nuclear Blast
USA	9 November 2010	Metal Blade Records

== Charts ==
Chart (2000)	Peak position
Billboard Top Music Videos	15
Canadian Top Music Videos	12
French DVD Albums Chart	22

== Certifications ==
Region	Certification	Certified units/sales
Poland (ZPAV)	Platinum	10,000^{*}
^{*} Sales figures based on certification alone.
