= Opvs Contra Natvram =

Studio album by Behemoth
- Released: 16 September 2022
- Genre: Blackened death metal
- Length: 43:10
- Language: English; Latin; Greek; German
- Label: Nuclear Blast
- Producer: Behemoth

Behemoth chronology
In Absentia Dei (2021)	Opvs Contra Natvram (2022)	The Shit Ov God (2025)

Behemoth studio album chronology
I Loved You at Your Darkest (2018)	Opvs Contra Natvram (2022)	The Shit Ov God (2025)

Singles from Opvs Contra Natvram
- 1. "Ov My Herculean Exile" Released: 11 May 2022; 2. "Off to War!" Released: 15 June 2022; 3. "The Deathless Sun" Released: 27 July 2022; 4. "Thy Becoming Eternal" Released: 17 August 2022

Opvs Contra Natvram (or Work Against Nature) is the twelfth studio album by Polish extreme metal band Behemoth, released on 16 September 2022 through Nuclear Blast.

== Critical reception ==
Professional ratings
Review scores
Source	Rating
Angry Metal Guy	3.0/5.0
Blabbermouth.net	8.5/10
Metal Injection	7.5/10
Wall of Sound	9/10

Upon release, Opvs Contra Natvram was met with universal acclaim from music critics like its predecessors, The Satanist and I Loved You at Your Darkest. A 9/10 was given to the album from Wall of Sound, saying "What we can say without a shred of doubt is that Opvs Contra Natvram stands firmly amongst the year's best music releases."

== Track listing ==
All music composed by Nergal, except where noted.

Opvs Contra Natvram track listing
No.	Title	Music	Length
1.	"Post-God Nirvana"	Nergal; Tomasz Wroblewski	3:11
2.	"Malaria Vvlgata"		2:18
3.	"The Deathless Sun"		4:40
4.	"Ov My Herculean Exile"	Nergal; Tomasz Wroblewski	4:43
5.	"Neo-Spartacvs"		4:18
6.	"Disinheritance"		4:22
7.	"Off to War!"		4:47
8.	"Once Upon a Pale Horse"		4:16
9.	"Thy Becoming Eternal"	Nergal; Tomasz Wroblewski	4:09
10.	"Versvs Christvs"		6:32
Total length:			43:07

== Personnel ==
Behemoth

- Adam "Nergal" Darski – guitar, vocals, lyrics
- Tomasz "Orion" Wróblewski – bass
- Zbigniew Robert "Inferno" Promiński – drums
- Patryk Dominik "Seth" Sztyber – guitar

Additional personnel

- Daniel Bergstrand – production, editing
- Sebastian Has – engineering, management
- Filip Hałucha and Haldor Grunberg – engineering
- Joe Barresi – mixing
- Bob Ludwig – mastering
- Jun Murakawa – musical assistance
