= Ezkaton =

EP by Behemoth
- Released: 11 November 2008
- Recorded: November 2006 – April 2007; October 2007
- Genre: Death metal; blackened death metal
- Length: 27:53
- Label: Metal Blade, Regain, Mystic Production
- Producer: Behemoth

Behemoth chronology
At the Arena ov Aion – Live Apostasy (2008)	Ezkaton (2008)	Evangelion (2009)

Alternative cover
- Limited edition box set cover

Professional ratings
Review scores
Source	Rating
AllMusic	3.5/5 stars
Chronicles of Chaos	8/10 stars

Ezkaton is the sixth EP by Polish extreme metal band Behemoth. It was released in North America through Metal Blade Records on 11 November 2008, and in Europe through Regain Records on 20 November 2008. The EP features seven tracks, including one new song titled "Qadosh", a live recording and new studio version to "Chant for Ezkaton 2000 e.v.", live versions of "From the Pagan Vastlands" and "Decade ov Therion", along with covers of Master's Hammer's "Jáma pekel" (lead vocal BigBoss-Root) and Ramones' "I'm Not Jesus".

The first four tracks were recorded during The Apostasy studio sessions at the Radio Gdańsk Studios from November 2006 till March 2007. The other three live tracks were recorded in Leeuwarden, The Netherlands in October 2007 the during the European Apostasy tour.

Ezkaton has also been released as a limited edition box set, that includes four 7-inch picture discs. The set also comes with a bonus track, "Devilock" (Misfits cover) on the third picture disc. Each picture disc has one track on each side.

In 2014, the EP (including the "Devilock" bonus track and several live tracks) was included in a re-release of The Apostasy by Peaceville Records.

The limited edition box set also has two manufacturing mistakes: the CD title for track 3 "Jamal Pekel" is written as "Jamal Piekiel". And the back of the box misses the "live" mention for "Decade Ov Therion".

== Track listing ==
Regular CD and digipak

No.	Title	Lyrics	Music	Length
1.	"Chant for Ezkaton 2000 e.v."	Krzysztof Azarewicz	Nergal	5:11
2.	"Qadosh"	Krzysztof Azarewicz	Nergal	4:58
3.	"Jáma pekel" (Master's Hammer cover)	František Štorm	Milan Fibiger, Necrocock, Štorm	3:59
4.	"I'm Not Jesus" (Ramones cover)	Richie Ramone	Richie Ramone	2:41
5.	"From the Pagan Vastlands" (live)	Tomasz Krajewski	Nergal	3:01
6.	"Decade ov Therion" (live)	Krzysztof Azarewicz	Nergal	2:56
7.	"Chant for Ezkaton 2000 e.v." (live)	Krzysztof Azarewicz	Nergal	5:07
Total length:				27:53

== Personnel ==
Behemoth

- Adam "Nergal" Darski – guitars, vocals
- Tomasz "Orion" Wróblewski – bass
- Zbigniew Robert "Inferno" Promiński – drums

Additional musicians

- Patryk Dominik "Seth" Sztyber – guitars
- Igor Hubík (Root) – vocals on Jáma pekel
- Jiří "Big Boss " Valter (Root) – lead vocals on Jáma pekel

Production

- Tomasz "Graal" Danilowicz – cover concept, design, and artwork direction
- Arkadiusz "Malta" Malczewski – engineering (tracks (1–4)
- Bjorn Engelmann – mastering (tracks 1–2)
- Grzegorz Piwkowski – mastering (tracks 3–7)
- Daniel Bergstrand – mixing (tracks 1–6)
- Kuba Mankowski – recording (tracks 1–6)
- Krzysztof Azarewicz – lyrics

Note

- Songs 1–4 recorded during The Apostasy studio sessions at RG Studios, November 2006 – March 2007
- Mixed in Dug Out Studio, Uppsala, March 2007 e.v. and June 2008
- Additional vocal tracks recorded in Soundsgreat Studio, Gdynia, May 2008
- Songs 5–7 recorded in Leeuwarden, Holland, October 2007 during "European Apostasy" tour
- Songs 1–2 mastered in Cutting Room Studio, Stockholm, March 2007
- Songs 3–7 mastered in High-End Audio, Warsaw, June 2008

== Release history ==
Region	Date	Label
Poland	10 November 2008	Mystic Production
USA	11 November 2008	Metal Blade Records
Sweden	20 November 2008	Regain Records

== Chart performance ==
Chart (2008)	Peak position
U.S. Billboard Heatseekers	26
