= Zbigniew Robert Promiński =

Inferno
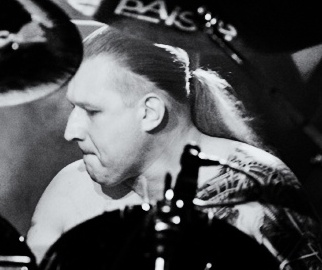
- Inferno with Azarath, 2011

Background information
- Also known as: Inferno
- Born: Zbigniew Robert Promiński; 30 December 1978 (age 47); Tczew, Poland
- Genres: Blackened death metal; black metal; death metal
- Occupation: Musician
- Instruments: Drums; percussion; guitar
- Years active: 1995–present

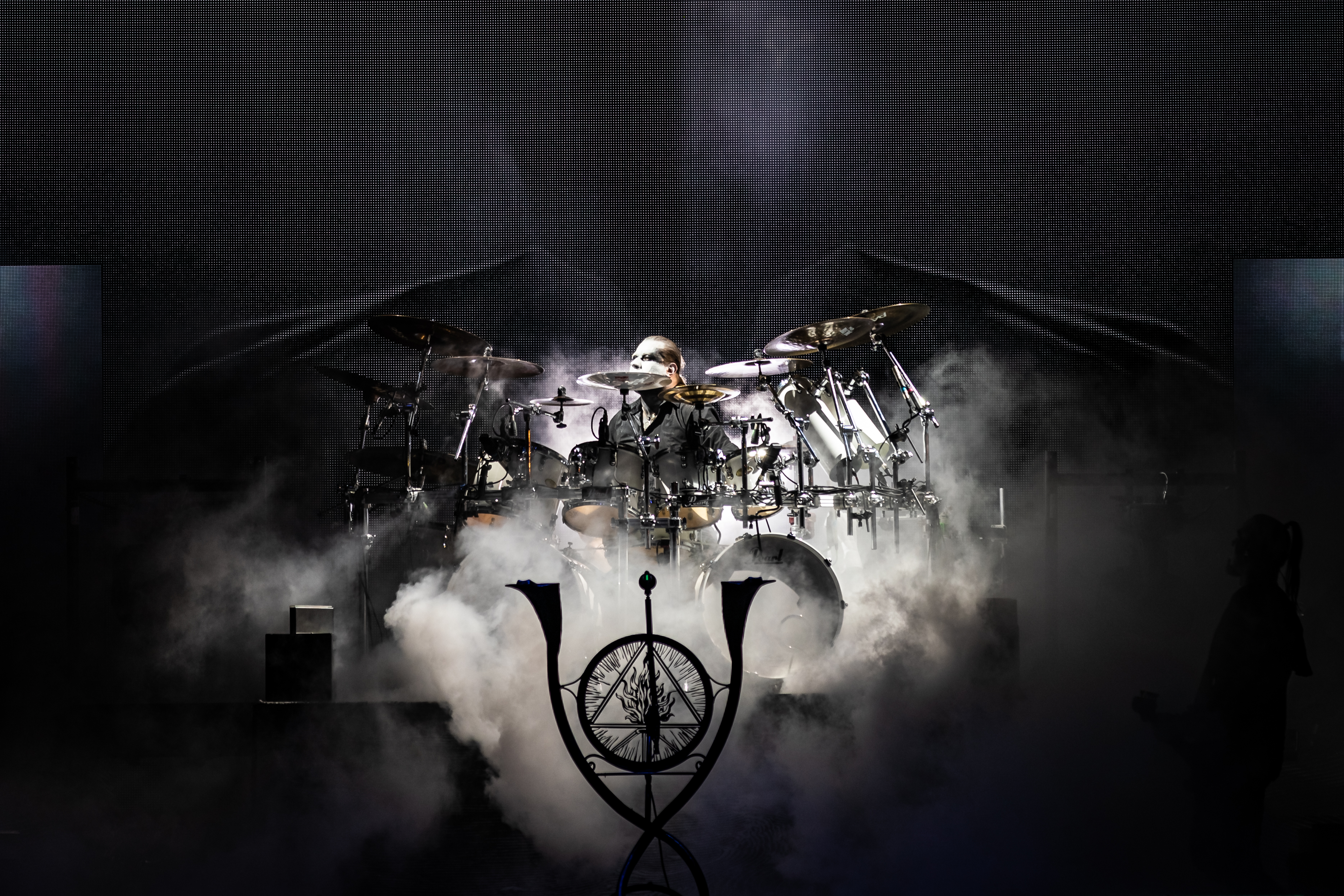
Inferno with Behemoth live at Rock am Ring 2019

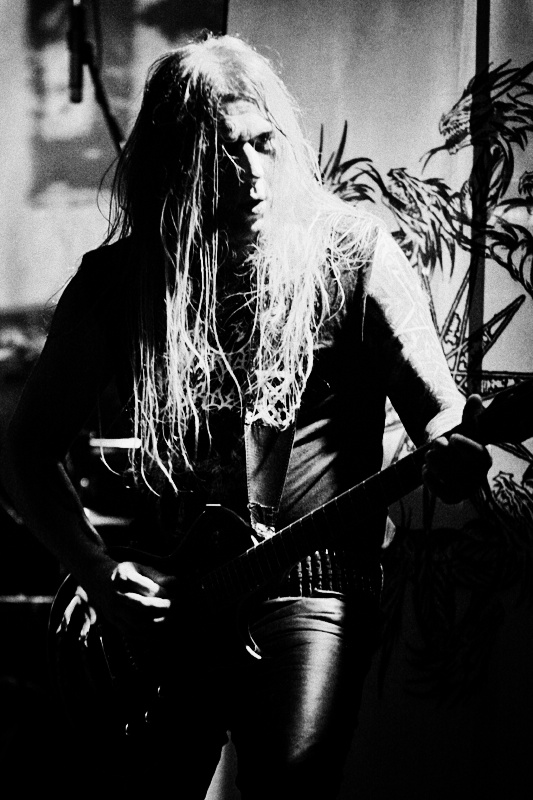
Inferno with Deus Mortem, 2011

Zbigniew Robert Promiński (born 30 December 1978 in Tczew), stage name Inferno, is a Polish heavy metal musician, best known as the drummer for extreme metal band Behemoth. He has also contributed to bands such as Azarath, Witchmaster, Damnation, Deus Mortem, Artrosis, Christ Agony, and Devilyn. Also, his endorsements include Paiste cymbals, Czarcie Kopyto pedals, Pearl drums, Evans Drumheads, and Vic Firth drumsticks.

Inferno joined Behemoth in 1997. He left the group briefly in 1999 during the release of Satanica, but returned in early 2000.

At the 2008 NAMM Show, Spaun Drums unveiled a 8x14 signature Inferno snare drum. The 18 ply Maple/Birch snare drum features a gun-metal finish with custom graphics and diecast hoops.

== Discography ==
Behemoth

- Bewitching the Pomerania (EP, 1997, Solistitium Records)
- Pandemonic Incantations (1998, Solistitium Records)
- Satanica (1999, Avantgarde Music)
- Originators of the Northern Darkness – A Tribute to Mayhem (2001, Avantgarde Music)
- Thelema.6 (2000, Avantgarde Music)
- Live Eschaton (2000, VHS, Metal Mind Records)
- Antichristian Phenomenon (EP, 2000, Avantgarde Music)
- Zos Kia Cultus (Here and Beyond) (2002, Avantgarde Music)
- Conjuration (EP, 2003, Regain Records)
- Demigod (2004, Regain Records)
- Crush.Fukk.Create: Requiem for Generation Armageddon (2004, DVD, Regain Records)
- Slaves Shall Serve (EP, 2005, Regain Records)
- Demonica (2006, Regain Records)
- The Apostasy (2007, Regain Records)
- At the Arena ov Aion – Live Apostasy (2008, Regain Records)
- Ezkaton (EP, 2008, Regain Records)
- Evangelion (2009, Nuclear Blast Records, Metal Blade Records)
- Evangelia Heretika (2010, DVD, Nuclear Blast, Metal Blade)
- Abyssus Abyssum Invocat (2011, Peaceville Records)
- Blow Your Trumpets Gabriel (EP, 2013, New Aeon Musick)
- The Satanist (2014, Nuclear Blast Records, Metal Blade Records)
- I Loved You at Your Darkest (2018, Nuclear Blast Records)
- Opvs Contra Natvram (2022, Nuclear Blast Records)
- The Shit Ov God (2025, Nuclear Blast Records)
- I, Scvlptor (2026, Nuclear Blast Records)

Witchmaster

- Masochistic Devil Worship (2002, Pagan Records)
- Witchmaster (2004, Agonia Records)
- Antichristus ex utero (2014, Osmose Productions)

Damnation

- Rebel Souls (1996, Last Epitaph)
- Coronation (1997, Last Episode)
- Czarne zastępy – W hołdzie KAT (1998, Pagan Records)
- Resurrection of Azarath (2003, Conquer Records)

Deus Mortem

- Darknessence (EP, 2011, Witching Hour Productions)
- Emanations of the Black Light (2013, Strych Promotions)

Guest and session work

- Devilyn - Promo 2000 (2000)
- Artrosis - Ukryty wymiar (2001, Metal Mind Records)
- Artrosis - W imię nocy (2001, Metal Mind Records)
- Christ Agony - NocturN (2011, Mystic Production)

== Setup ==
- Paiste
  - 14" RUDE Wild Hats
  - 13" Signature Mega Cup Chime
  - 20" RUDE Novo China
  - 18" RUDE Novo China
  - 18" RUDE Wild Crash
  - 15" 2002 Wild China
  - 19" RUDE Wild Crash
  - 20" RUDE China
  - 24" RUDE Mega Power Ride
  - 17" RUDE Wild Crash
- Pearl Reference
  - 2x 22" x 18" Bass Drum (RF2218BX)
  - 10" x 8" Tom (RF1008T)
  - 12" x 9" Tom (RF1209T)
  - 13" x 10" Tom (RF1310T)
  - 14" x 12" Tom (RF1412T)
  - 16" x 16" Floor Tom (RF1616F)
  - 18" x 16" Floor Tom (RF1816F)
  - 14" x 6.5" Snare Drum (RF1465S)

- Evans Drumheads
  - 22" Bass Drum - GMAD Clear(Batter), EQ3 Black(Resonant)
  - AF Patch - Kevlar Single Pedal
  - 14" Snare - Genera HD Dry(Batter), Hazy 300(Resonant)
  - Blasters Series Snare(20 Strand)
  - Toms - G2 Coated(Batter), G1 Clear(Resonant)
  - Magnetic Head Key
  - 12" 2-Sided Speed/Workout Pad
- Vic Firth American Classic Extreme 5B drumsticks
- Monolit Czarcie Kopyto Pedals
- Alesis DM5 Drum Module
