= Slaves Shall Serve =

EP by Behemoth
- Released: 20 October 2005
- Genre: Death metal
- Length: 21:12
- Label: Regain; Century Media
- Producer: Nergal

Behemoth chronology
Demigod (2004)	Slaves Shall Serve (2005)	Demonica (2006)

Professional ratings
Review scores
Source	Rating
Blabbermouth.net	7/10 stars
Tartarean Desire	7.5/10 stars

Slaves Shall Serve is the fifth EP by Polish extreme metal band Behemoth. The first four tracks were recorded during the Demigod studio sessions at Hendrix Studios during July and August in 2004. The last two tracks were recorded live at the Sweden Rock Festival in 2005.

The EP was released as an enhanced audio disc with two videos of Slaves Shall Serve. Both the censored and uncensored versions are included.

In 2011, the EP (along with several previously unreleased live tracks) was bundled with Conjuration and released as part of the compilation album Abyssus Abyssum Invocat.

== Track listing ==
No.	Title	Lyrics	Music	Length
1.	"Slaves Shall Serve"	Krzysztof Azarewicz	Nergal	3:05
2.	"Entering the Pylon ov Light"	Krzysztof Azarewicz	Nergal	3:42
3.	"Penetration" (Nefilim cover)	Carl McCoy	Carl McCoy, Cian Houchin, Paul Miles, Simon Rippin	3:10
4.	"Until You Call on the Dark" (Danzig cover)	Glenn Danzig	Glenn Danzig	4:26
5.	"Demigod" (live)	Nergal	Nergal	3:22
6.	"Slaves Shall Serve" (live)	Krzysztof Azarewicz	Nergal	3:27
Total length:				21:12

== Personnel ==
Behemoth

- Adam "Nergal" Darski – vocals, guitars, synth, programming
- Tomasz "Orion" Wróblewski – bass, backing vocals
- Zbigniew Robert "Inferno" Promiński – drums and percussion

Additional musicians

- Patryk Dominik "Seth" Sztyber – session guitars, backing vocals

Production

- Tomasz "Graal" Daniłowicz – cover design and artwork
- Thomas Eberger – audio mastering on track 1
- Grzegorz Piwkowski – audio mastering on tracks 2–6
- Arkadiusz "Malta" Malczewski – mixing on tracks 5 and 6, audio engineering
- Daniel Bergstrand – mixing on track 1
- Shelley Jambresic – photography of live performance

Note

- Tracks I to IV recorded during "Demigod" studio session at Hendrix Studios, July–August 2004.
- Vocals for tracks II to IV recorded and mixed at Hendrix Studios, July 2005.
- Additional vocals for track IV recorded at Radio Gdańsk, July 2005.
- Track I mixed at Dug Out Studio, Sweden, July–August 2004. Mastered at Cutting Room, Stockholm, August 2004.
- Tracks V & VI recorded at Sweden Rock Festival, 10 June 2005. Mixed at Hendrix Studios, July 2005.
- Tracks II to VI mastered at High End Studio, Warsaw, July 2005.

== Release history ==
Region	Date	Label
Europe	20 October 2005	Regain Records
USA	7 February 2006	Century Media Records
