= Demonica =

Box set by Behemoth
- Released: 10 July 2006
- Recorded: 19 December 1992; 24 September 1993; December 1993; December 1994; May–July 2004; July 2005
- Genre: Death metal; black metal; blackened death metal
- Length: 95:29
- Label: Regain
- Producer: Self-released

Behemoth chronology
Slaves Shall Serve (2005)	Demonica (2006)	The Apostasy (2007)

Professional ratings
Review scores
Source	Rating
AllMusic	3.5/5 stars
Teraz Rock	3.5/5 stars
Fearnet	favorable

Demonica is the first compilation album by Polish extreme metal band Behemoth. The boxset includes demos plus previously unreleased and re-recorded songs from Behemoth's "old school" days when they still played traditional black metal.

The boxset is limited to 10,000 copies and comes packed as an exclusive A5 digibook/slipcase with a 44-page book including rare photos and lyrics. It is also known that a limited edition gatefold double vinyl pressing was released, which is limited to 525 copies. It was re-released as a digipack containing all the original liner notes and lyrics from the box set through the band's current Metal Blade label in 2011.

== Track listing ==
CD 1

No.	Title	Lyrics	Music	Notes	Length
1.	"...Of My Worship" (Intro)	Nergal, Baal	Nergal	The Return of the Northern Moon	1:35
2.	"Summoning of the Ancient Gods"	Nergal, Baal	Nergal	The Return of the Northern Moon	6:07
3.	"The Arrival"	Nergal, Baal	Nergal	The Return of the Northern Moon	0:57
4.	"Dark Triumph"	Nergal, Baal	Nergal	The Return of the Northern Moon	5:24
5.	"Monumentum" (Instrumental)	–	Nergal	The Return of the Northern Moon	1:18
6.	"Rise of the Blackstorm of Evil"	Nergal, Baal	Nergal	The Return of the Northern Moon	7:02
7.	"Aggressor" (Hellhammer cover)	Tom Warrior	Tom Warrior	The Return of the Northern Moon	3:33
8.	"Goat with a Thousand Young" (Instrumental)	–	Nergal	The Return of the Northern Moon	3:09
9.	"Bless Thee for Granting Me Pain" (Previously unreleased)	Nergal	Nergal	Sventevith studio sessions	2:18
10.	"Cursed Angel of Doom" (Previously unreleased)	Nergal	Nergal	Sventevith studio sessions	3:09
11.	"Transylvanian Forest" (Previously unreleased, re-recorded)	Nergal	Nergal	Demigod studio sessions	3:16

CD 2

No.	Title	Lyrics	Music	Notes	Length
1.	"From Hornedlands to Lindisfarne"	Nergal	Nergal	...From the Pagan Vastlands	5:56
2.	"Thy Winter Kingdom"	Baal	Nergal	...From the Pagan Vastlands	5:17
3.	"Summoning (of the Ancient Ones)"	Baal	Nergal	...From the Pagan Vastlands	4:55
4.	"The Dance of the Pagan Flames"	Nergal	Nergal	...From the Pagan Vastlands	3:59
5.	"Blackvisions of the Almighty"	Nergal	Nergal	...From the Pagan Vastlands	4:49
6.	"Fields of Haar-Meggido"	Baal	Nergal	...From the Pagan Vastlands	6:35
7.	"Deathcrush" (Mayhem cover)	Mayhem	Mayhem	...From the Pagan Vastlands	3:20
8.	"Moonspell Rites" (Previously unreleased, alternate version)	Nergal	Nergal	...From the Pagan Vastlands pre-production	6:53
9.	"Blackvisions of the Almighty" (Previously unreleased, alternate version)	Nergal	Nergal	...From the Pagan Vastlands pre-production	6:40
10.	"Pure Evil & Hate" (Previously unreleased, alternate version)	Nergal	Nergal	...From the Pagan Vastlands pre-production	3:15
11.	"The Oak Between the Snows" (Instrumental, previously unreleased)	–	Nergal, Frost	...From the Pagan Vastlands pre-production	2:29
12.	"Spellcraft & Heathendom" (Previously unreleased, re-recorded)	Nergal	Nergal	Demigod studio sessions	3:33
Total length:					95:29

== Personnel ==
CD 1

- Tracks 1–8
  - Adam "Nergal" Darski – guitars, bass and vocals
  - Adam "Baal Ravenlock" Muraszko – drums and percussion
  - Additional effects and synth by Robert "Rob Darken" Fudali
- Tracks 9–10
  - Adam "Nergal" – rhythm & acoustic guitars, bass and vocals
  - Adam "Baal Ravenlock" Muraszko – drums and percussion
- Track 11
  - Adam "Nergal" – lead & rhythm guitars, all vocals
  - Zbigniew Robert "Inferno" Promiński – drums and percussion
  - Tomasz "Orion" Wróblewski – bass

CD 2

- Tracks 1–11
  - Adam "Nergal" Darski – lead & rhythm guitars, all vocals
  - Adam "Baal Ravenlock" Muraszko – drums and percussion
  - Rafał "Frost / Browar" Brauer – lead & rhythm guitars
  - Orcus – session bass
- Track 12
  - Adam "Nergal" Darski – lead & rhythm guitars, all vocals
  - Zbigniew Robert "Inferno" Promiński – drums and percussion
  - Tomasz "Orion" Wróblewski – bass
- All tracks re-mastered by Grzegorz Piwkowski at High-End Studio, September 2005.

== Release history ==
Region	Date	Label
Sweden, Russia	10 July 2006	Regain Records, CD-Maximum
United States	22 November 2011	Metal Blade Records
