= I Loved You at Your Darkest =

2018 studio album by Behemoth

Studio album by Behemoth
- Released: October 5, 2018
- Recorded: March – August 2018
- Genre: Blackened death metal
- Length: 46:32
- Label: Nuclear Blast; Metal Blade; Mystic; JVC Kenwood Victor; EVP
- Producer: Behemoth; Daniel Bergstrand; Grupa 13; Sławomir Wiesławski; Wojciech Wiesławski

Behemoth chronology
Messe Noire (2018)	I Loved You at Your Darkest (2018)	O Pentagram Ignis (2019)

Behemoth studio album chronology
The Satanist (2014)	I Loved You at Your Darkest (2018)	Opvs Contra Natvram (2022)

Singles from I Loved You at Your Darkest
- 1. "God = Dog" Released: 2 August 2018; 2. "Wolves ov Siberia" Released: 6 September 2018; 3. "Bartzabel" Released: 1 October 2018

I Loved You at Your Darkest is the eleventh studio album by Polish extreme metal band Behemoth, released on 5 October 2018.

== Reception ==
Professional ratings
Aggregate scores
Source	Rating
Metacritic	88/100
Review scores
Source	Rating
Consequence of Sound	A
Exclaim!	7/10
The Guardian	4/5 stars
Metal Injection	7/10
Metal Hammer	4.5/5 stars
Noizr Zine	7/10

Like its predecessor, The Satanist, I Loved You at Your Darkest was met with universal acclaim from music critics. Wall of Sound gave the album a perfect 10/10 review and said: "They have taken their sound, their style and their dynamic, as well as the best of their influences and put forth something that is beyond otherworldly." The album was also nominated for 'Best Album' at the 2019 Kerrang! Awards.

== Track listing ==
All tracks are written by Nergal, except where noted.

I Loved You at Your Darkest track listing
No.	Title	Lyrics	Length
1.	"Solve"		2:04
2.	"Wolves ov Siberia"		2:54
3.	"God = Dog"		3:58
4.	"Ecclesia Diabolica Catholica"		4:49
5.	"Bartzabel"	Aleister Crowley; Krzysztof Azarewicz	5:01
6.	"If Crucifixion Was Not Enough..."		3:16
7.	"Angelvs XIII"		3:41
8.	"Sabbath Mater"		4:56
9.	"Havohej Pantocrator"		6:04
10.	"Rom 5:8"		4:22
11.	"We Are the Next 1000 Years"		3:23
12.	"Coagvla" (instrumental)		2:04
Total length:			46:32

Japanese edition bonus track
No.	Title	Length
13.	"O Pentagram Ignis"	4:49
Total length:		51:21

== Personnel ==
Behemoth

- Nergal – guitar, lead vocals
- Orion – bass, backing vocals
- Inferno – drums

Technical staff

- Haldor Grunberg – engineer
- Ignacy Gruszecki – engineer
- Heinrich (Filip Hałucha) – engineer
- Dariusz Budkiewicz – engineer
- Sebastian Has – engineer
- Tomasz Budkiewicz – engineer
- Bartosz Rogalewicz – design (sigil), drawings and layout
- Denis Forkas Kostromitin – calligraphy
- Jan Stokłosa – orchestral arrangements
- Matt Hyde – mixing
- Nicola Samori – cover art
- Tom Baker – mastering

Guests

- Seth – guitar
- Dziablas (Jan Galbas) – backing vocals
- Filip Wozniakowski – oboe
- Krzysztof Lenczowski – cello
- Maciej Chyży – bass trombone
- Michał Łapaj – hammond organ
- Michał Sobuś – double bass
- Seweryn Zaplatynski – flute
- Siegmar (Krzysztof Oloś) – samples
- Sylwia Mróz – viola
- Waldemar Zarow – clarinet
- Wawrzyniec Dramowicz – percussion
- Gabriel Czopka – horn
- Igor Szeligowski – horn
- Marek Michalec – horn
- Anna Szalińska – piccolo
- Paulina Mastyło-Falkiewicz – piccolo
- Karol Gadja] – trombone
- Piotr Tchórzewski – trombone
- Ostap Popowicz – trumpet
- Paweł Wróblewski – trumpet

== Charts ==
Chart performance for I Loved You at Your Darkest
Chart (2018)	Peak position
Australian Albums (ARIA)	34
Austrian Albums (Ö3 Austria)	12
Belgian Albums (Ultratop Flanders)	47
Belgian Albums (Ultratop Wallonia)	69
Canadian Albums (Billboard)	78
Czech Albums (ČNS IFPI)	46
Finnish Albums (Suomen virallinen lista)	7
German Albums (Offizielle Top 100)	7
Italian Albums (FIMI)	73
Polish Albums (ZPAV)	4
Scottish Albums (OCC)	24
Spanish Albums (PROMUSICAE)	66
Swedish Albums (Sverigetopplistan)	19
Swiss Albums (Schweizer Hitparade)	17
UK Albums (OCC)	42
UK Rock & Metal Albums (OCC)	2
US Billboard 200	85
US Top Rock Albums (Billboard)	15
