= At the Arena ov Aion – Live Apostasy =

Live album by Behemoth
- Released: 31 October 2008
- Recorded: 17 February 2008; Paris, France
- Genre: Death metal; blackened death metal
- Length: 65:34
- Label: Regain, Victor Entertainment
- Producer: Behemoth

Behemoth chronology
The Apostasy (2007)	At the Arena ov Aion – Live Apostasy (2008)	Ezkaton (2008)

Professional ratings
Review scores
Source	Rating
Chronicles of Chaos	9/10 stars
Teraz Rock	3/5 stars

At the Arena ov Aion – Live Apostasy is the first live album by Polish extreme metal band Behemoth. It was released on 31 October 2008 through Regain Records. The album was recorded live at La Loco in Paris, France, on 17 February 2008 during the European Apostasy tour. The record was then mixed and edited in the Antfarm Studio, Denmark in June 2008. Additional editing took place in the Soundsgreat Studio in Poland during April and May 2008. The record was then mastered at the Cutting Room Studios in Stockholm, Sweden, in July 2008.

The live album was also released as a digibook including 17 tracks. A limited metalbox edition (including a patch, a guitar pick and 2 bonus songs) was announced but never came to fruition due to Regain Records financial problems.

== Track listing ==
No.	Title	Lyrics	Music	Length
1.	"Rome 64 e.v."	–	Nergal	1:34
2.	"Slaying the Prophets Ov Isa"	Nergal	Nergal	3:39
3.	"Antichristian Phenomenon"	Nergal	Nergal	4:13
4.	"Demigod"	Nergal	Nergal	3:35
5.	"From the Pagan Vastlands"	Tomasz Krajewski	Nergal	3:56
6.	"Conquer All"	Nergal	Nergal	4:17
7.	"Prometherion"	Nergal	Nergal	3:13
8.	"Drum Solo"	–	Inferno	1:14
9.	"Slaves Shall Serve"	Krzysztof Azarewicz	Nergal	3:07
10.	"As Above So Below"	Krzysztof Azarewicz	Nergal	5:46
11.	"At the Left Hand Ov God"	Nergal, Krzysztof Azarewicz	Nergal	4:57
12.	"Summoning Ov the Ancient Ones"	Nergal	Nergal	5:23
13.	"Christgrinding Avenue"	Nergal	Nergal	4:04
14.	"Christians to the Lions"	Nergal	Nergal	3:16
15.	"Sculpting the Throne Ov Seth"	Nergal	Nergal	4:55
16.	"Decade Ov Therion"	Krzysztof Azarewicz	Nergal	2:47
17.	"Chant for Ezkaton 2000 e.v."	Krzysztof Azarewicz	Nergal	5:28

Bonus tracks

Bonus tracks that were supposed to be included in metalbox version only (never released)

No.	Title	Lyrics	Music	Length
18.	"I Got Erection" (Turbonegro cover)
19.	"Pure Evil & Hate"	Nergal	Nergal

== Personnel ==
Behemoth

- Adam "Nergal" Darski – lead guitar, lead vocals
- Tomasz "Orion" Wróblewski – bass, backing vocals
- Zbigniew Robert "Inferno" Promiński – drums and percussion

Additional musicians

- Patryk Dominik "Seth" Sztyber – rhythm guitar, backing vocals

Note

- Recorded live in La Loco, Paris on 17 February 2008 during "European Apostasy" tour.
- Mixed and edited, June 2008.
- Additional editing in Soundsgreat Studio, Poland, April–May 2008
- Mastered, July 2008.

Production

- Tomasz Danilowicz – cover concept and artwork direction
- Graal – cover design and artwork
- Bjorn Engelmann – mastering
- Tue Madsen – mixing, editing
- Kuba Mankowski (Pneuma) – editing
- Agnieszka Krysiuk – live photography
- Daniel Falk – live photography
- Martn Darksoul – live photography
- Shelley Jambresic – live photography
- Stephane Buriez – recording
- Adam "Nergal" Darski – lyrics
- Tomasz Krajewski – lyrics of From the Pagan Vastlands
- Krzysztof Azarewicz – lyrics

== Release history ==
Region	Date	Label
Europe	31 October 2008	Regain Records
Japan	19 November 2008	Victor Entertainment
