= Patryk Dominik Sztyber =

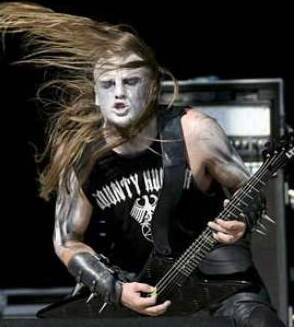
- Seth performing on stage in 2005

Background information
- Also known as: Seth
- Born: Patryk Dominik Sztyber; 4 August 1979 (age 47); Opoczno, Poland
- Genres: Blackened death metal; death metal; black metal
- Occupations: Musician; songwriter; guitarist
- Instruments: Guitar; vocals
- Years active: 1994–present

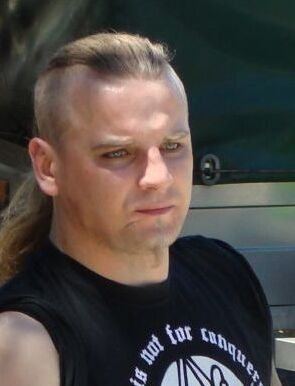
Seth in 2007

Patryk Dominik Sztyber (born 4 August 1979, in Opoczno), stage name Seth, is a Polish heavy metal musician. He is best known for being the guitarist for Behemoth. He is also the guitarist for Polish death metal band Nomad.

== Discography ==
Behemoth

- Demigod (2004)
- Slaves Shall Serve (2005)
- Demonica (2006)
- The Apostasy (2007)
- At the Arena ov Aion – Live Apostasy (2008)
- Ezkaton (2008)
- Evangelion (2009)
- Evangelia Heretika (2010)
- Abyssus Abyssum Invocat (2011)
- The Satanist (2014)
- I Loved You at Your Darkest (2018)
- Opvs Contra Natvram (2022)
- The Shit Ov God (2025)
- I, Scvlptor (2026)

Nomad

- Disorder (1996)
- The Tail of Substance (1997)
- Devilish Whirl (1999)
- Demonic Verses (Blessed Are Those Who Kill Jesus) (2004)
- The Independence of Observation Choice (2007)
- Transmigration of Consciousness (2011)
- Transmorgrification (Partus) (2020)

== Equipment ==
- ESP Custom EX 7 String guitar with Winged Chaostar and Pentagram Fret Inlays
- ESP LTD 400-BD
- ESP EX Diamond Plate
- ESP LTD Viper-407
- Gibson Explorer
- 2x Laboga Mr. Hector Amplifiers
- 2x Laboga 312B Mr.Hector Cabinets
- Mark L rack system
  - Mark L Midi Control System FC-12
  - Mark L Loop & Switch LS-145
  - Mark L DC/AC Power Box
  - Mark L Mini Line Mixer
  - Line 6 XT Pro
  - Korg DTR 1 Tuner
  - Neutrik & Switchcraft
  - Boos Pitch
  - Mogami Cable
  - Furman Power
- D'Addario Strings
- Nologo Behemoth custom picks
