= Demigod (album) =

Studio album by Behemoth
- Released: 25th October 2004
- Recorded: May–June 2004; Hendrix Studios, Poland
- Genre: Blackened death metal
- Length: 41:02
- Label: Mystic, Regain, Century Media, Victor Entertainment
- Producer: Nergal

Behemoth chronology
Crush.Fukk.Create: Requiem for Generation Armageddon (2004)	Demigod (2004)	Slaves Shall Serve (2005)

Behemoth studio album chronology
Zos Kia Cultus (Here and Beyond) (2002)	Demigod (2004)	The Apostasy (2007)

Alternative cover
- 2010 re-release cover art

Professional ratings
Review scores
Source	Rating
Allmusic	4.5/5 stars
PopMatters	9/10 stars
Chronicles of Chaos	9/10 stars
Teraz Rock	5/5 stars

Demigod is the seventh studio album by Polish extreme metal band Behemoth. The album was recorded during May and July in 2004 at the Hendrix Studios and was released in October 2004. Daniel Bergstrand mixed the record at the Dug out Studios in Uppsala, Sweden during July and August in 2004. The record was then mastered at the Cutting Room in Stockholm, Sweden in August 2004.

The track "XUL" included a guest guitar solo by Karl Sanders of Nile.

The track "Before the Æons Came" is an adaptation of a poem by British poet Algernon Charles Swinburne.

The track "Conquer All" was featured as DLC in the rhythm game Rock Band 2, and has continued to be featured in subsequent games.

Along with being Behemoth's breakthrough album, Demigod is now considered a landmark album within the Polish death metal scene, with Decibel Magazine notably including it in their Hall of Fame.

== Track listing ==
No.	Title	Lyrics	Music	Length
1.	"Sculpting the Throne ov Seth"	Nergal	Nergal	4:43
2.	"Demigod"	Nergal	Nergal	3:33
3.	"Conquer All"	Nergal	Nergal	3:31
4.	"The Nephilim Rising"	Krzysztof Azarewicz	Nergal	4:22
5.	"Towards Babylon"	Nergal	Nergal	3:24
6.	"Before the Æons Came"	Algernon Charles Swinburne	Nergal	3:00
7.	"Mysterium Coniunctionis (Hermanubis)"	Krzysztof Azarewicz	Nergal	3:42
8.	"XUL"	Nergal	Nergal	3:13
9.	"Slaves Shall Serve"	Krzysztof Azarewicz	Nergal	3:06
10.	"The Reign ov Shemsu-Hor"	Nergal	Nergal	8:28
Total length:				41:02

Japanese edition bonus tracks
No.	Title	Lyrics	Music	Length
11.	"Conjuration ov sleep Daemons"	Krzysztof Azarewicz	Nergal	3:25
12.	"Welcome to Hell" (Venom cover)	Abaddon, Cronos, Mantas	Abaddon, Cronos, Mantas	3:15
Total length:				47:42

Special edition DVD (Live Leeuwarden, Holland 10 December 2007)
No.	Title	Lyrics	Music	Length
1.	"Antichristian Phenomenon"	Nergal	Nergal
2.	"Demigod"	Nergal	Nergal
3.	"From The Pagan Vastlands"	Nergal	Nergal
4.	"Prometherion"	Nergal	Nergal
5.	"Conquer All"	Nergal	Nergal
6.	"Christ Grinder Avenue"	Nergal	Nergal
7.	"As Above As Below"	Krzysztof Azarewicz	Nergal
8.	"Decade Ov Therion"	Krzysztof Azarewicz	Nergal
9.	"Chant For Ezkaton 2000"	Krzysztof Azarewicz	Nergal
10.	"I Got Erection" (Turbonegro cover)

== Personnel ==
Behemoth

- Adam "Nergal" Darski – guitar, vocals, acoustic guitar
- Zbigniew Robert "Inferno" Promiński – drums, percussion
- Tomasz "Orion" Wróblewski – bass

Additional musicians

- Patryk Dominik "Seth" Sztyber – session guitar
- Karl Sanders – guitar solo on "XUL"
- Piotr Bańka – synthesizers, arrangements
- Academic Male Choir From Lublin – choir

Production

- Arkadiusz "Malta" Malczewski – sound engineering
- Tomasz "Graal" Daniłowicz – cover design, artwork
- Adam "Nergal" Darski – lyrics
- Krzysztof Azarewicz – lyrics
- Zenon Darski – weaponry, armour
- Thomas Eberger – mastering
- Sharon E. Wennekers – grammatical consultations
- Dominik Kulaszewicz – photography
- Krzysztof Sadowski – photography
- Tomasz Daniłowicz – The Core Ov Hell mask design
- Zenon Darski – The Core Ov Hell mask finishing
- Norbert Grabianowski – The Core Ov Hell mask forging

Note

- Recorded at Hendrix Studios, Lublin; May–July 2004
- Mixed at Dug Out Studio, Upsala; July–August 2004
- Mastered at Cutting Room, Stockholm; August 2004

== Release history ==
Region	Date	Label
Poland	11 October 2004	Mystic Production
Europe	8 November 2004	Regain Records
USA	25 January 2005	Century Media Records
Japan	19 November 2009	Victor Entertainment

== Charts ==
Chart (2004)	Peak position
Polish Albums Chart	15
