= Tomasz Wróblewski =

Polish heavy metal musician

Orion
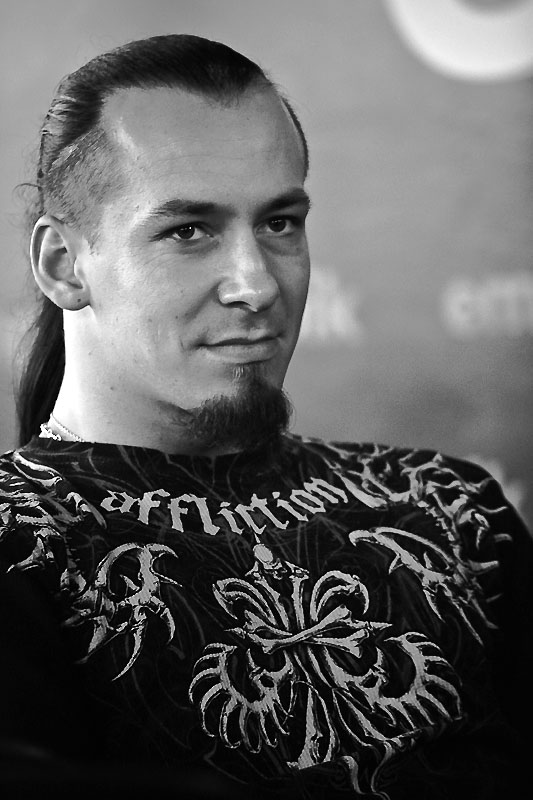
- Wróblewski in 2009

Background information
- Born: Tomasz Wróblewski; 2 June 1980 (age 46); Warsaw, Poland
- Genres: Blackened death metal; symphonic black metal; extreme metal; heavy metal; stoner rock
- Occupation: Musician
- Instruments: Bass; vocals; guitar
- Years active: 1997–present
- Member of: Behemoth; Black River
- Formerly of: Vesania; Neolithic

Tomasz Wróblewski (born 2 June 1980), stage name Orion, is a Polish musician, best known as the bassist for the extreme metal band Behemoth. Since 1997, he also is a member of symphonic black metal band Vesania as a lead vocalist and guitarist.

== Biography ==
Wróblewski was born in Warsaw. In 2002, he became bassist of doom metal band Neolithic and was a member of the group until 2006 when they were disbanded. In 2003, he joined Behemoth as session bassist. After the departure of Mateusz "Havoc" Śmierzchalski, Orion switched to guitar. In 2004, Behemoth was joined by session guitarist Patryk "Seth" Sztyber, while Orion took bass again, and became an official member. In 2010 with members of defunct band Neolithic, Orion formed the rock band Black River. The group eventually split up after releasing two albums, due to vocalist Maciej Taff's retirement from the music industry because of health conditions.

Orion's bass playing technique was fingerstyle until in late 2017 where he switch to picks and still plays it with picks since for Behemoth.

Orion is endorsed by ESP/Ltd, Darkglass and Markbass.

== Discography ==
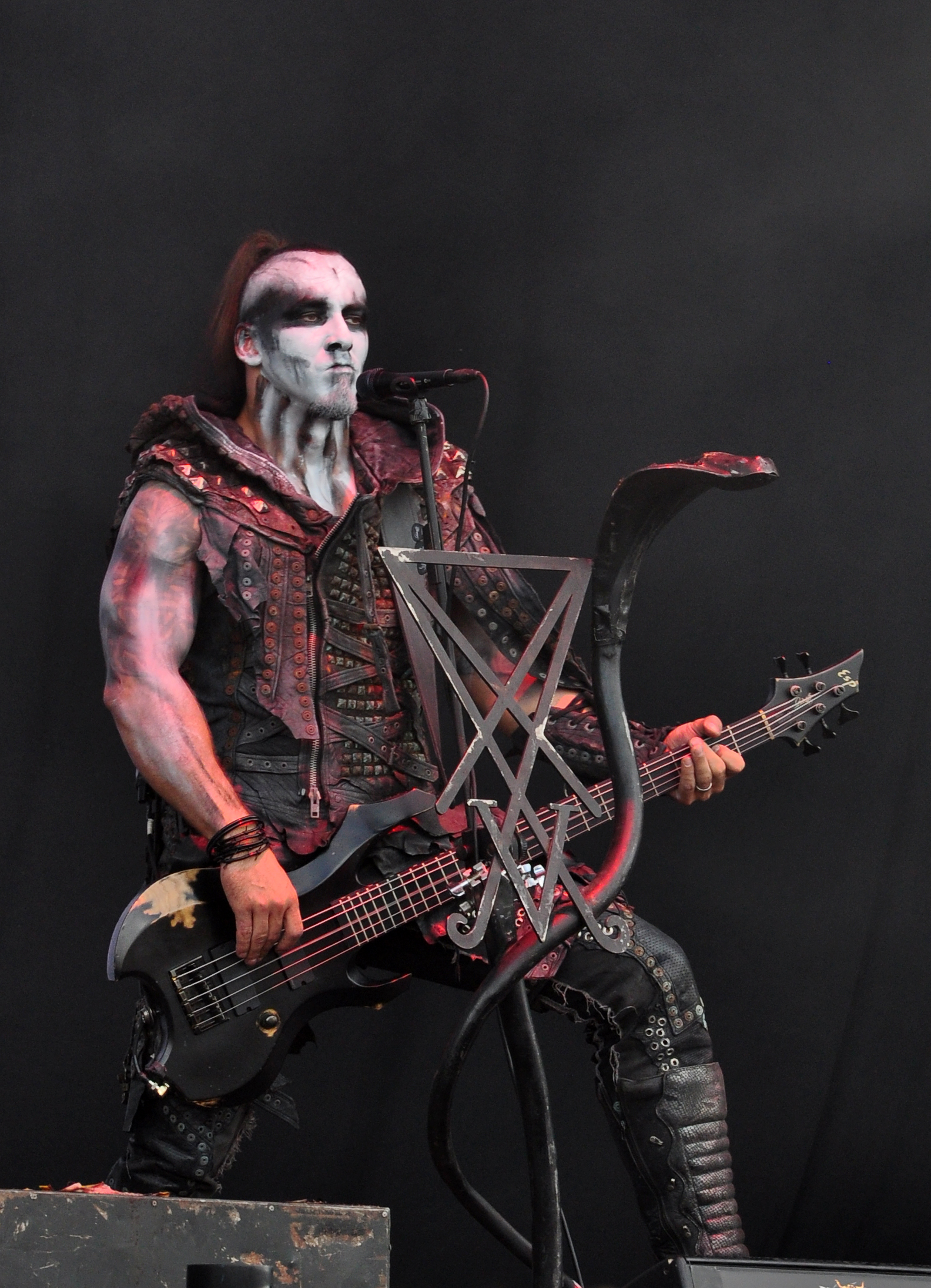
Wróblewski with Behemoth at Wacken Open Air 2014

Behemoth

- Demigod (2004)
- Slaves Shall Serve (2005)
- Demonica (2006)
- The Apostasy (2007)
- At the Arena ov Aion – Live Apostasy (2008)
- Ezkaton (2008)
- Evangelion (2009)
- Abyssus Abyssum Invocat (2011)
- The Satanist (2014)
- I Loved You at Your Darkest (2018)
- Opvs Contra Natvram (2022)
- The Shit Ov God (2025)
- I, Scvlptor (2026)

Vesania

- 2002: Wrath ov the Gods / Moonastray
- 2003: Firefrost Arcanum
- 2005: God the Lux
- 2007: Distractive Killusions
- 2008: Rage of Reason
- 2014: Deus Ex Machina

Neolithic

- My Beautiful Enemy (2003)
- Team 666 (2004)

Other

- Vader – And Blood Was Shed in Warsaw (DVD, 2007, guest appearance)
- Vulgar – I Don't Wanna Go To Heaven (EP, 2009, guest appearance)
- Vulgar – The Professional Blasphemy (2010, guest appearance)
- My Riot – Sweet Noise (2011, guest appearance)
- Leash Eye – V.I.D.I. (2011, record producer)
- Devilish Impressions – Simulacra (2012, guest appearance)
- Sammath Naur – Beyond the Limits (2012, guest appearance)

== Equipment ==
- ESP Tom Araya Signature 4-String Basses (tuned G#-C#-F#-B and B-E-A-D)
- Custom ESP TA 5-String Bass (tuned G#-C#-F#-B-E)
- LTD F-255FM Series Bass, LTD B-500 4-String Bass, LTD TA-600 Bass, Spector Rex 5 Bass, JB Custom 5-String Bass (Based on the B.C. Rich Beast Bass)
- MarkBass Standard 104HF, Amp Frame 800, T1M, EQ42S, MVVL
- Hesu Cables
- DV Mark C 412 Standard, Triple 6
