= Evangelion (album) =

Studio album by Behemoth
- Released: 7 August 2009
- Recorded: February – May 2009
- Studios: Radio Gdańsk, Gdańsk, Poland
- Genre: Blackened death metal
- Length: 41:54
- Languages: English; Polish
- Labels: Metal Blade; Nuclear Blast; Mystic Production; Victor; Demonstealer
- Producers: Daniel Bergstrand; Wojciech Wiesławski; Sławomir Wiesławski

Behemoth chronology
Ezkaton (2008)	Evangelion (2009)	Evangelia Heretika (2010)

Behemoth studio album chronology
The Apostasy (2007)	Evangelion (2009)	The Satanist (2014)

Singles from Evangelion
- 1. "Ov Fire and the Void" Released: 28 July 2009; 2. "Alas, Lord Is Upon Me" Released: 11 August 2010; 3. "Lucifer" Released: 4 October 2011

Professional ratings
Review scores
Source	Rating
About.com	4/5 stars
AllMusic	4/5 stars
Kerrang!	4/5 stars
Terrorizer	9/10 stars
Teraz Rock	4.5/5 stars
Sputnikmusic	3.5/5 stars
Interia	8/10 stars
Onet	4/5 stars
Fearnet	favorable
Exclaim!	favorable
Loudwire	4.5/5 stars

Evangelion is the ninth studio album by Polish extreme metal band Behemoth. The album was released on 7 August 2009 through Nuclear Blast Records, and on 11 August 2009 through Metal Blade Records in the United States.

== Background ==
The album title refers to the Good News in Christianity; the message of Jesus Christ.

Evangelion comes from a Greek word 'Spreading the word of God' or 'spreading the good news'…oh well, you already know that we love to play with the meanings and symbolism. We're here to show you our interpretation of what Evangelion really is.

— Nergal

The album's cover artwork is a depiction of The Great Harlot of Babylon, the figures of evil mentioned in the Book of Revelation in the Bible.

The picture is of The Great Harlot of Babylon riding the seven-headed beast. Saints bow before her in worship whilst the tablets of the Ten Commandments lie broken at her feet. It represents our vision and the interpretation of the New Testament parable where the "Whore of Babylon" is a symbol of rebellion and resistance against God.

— Nergal

== Recording and production ==
In January 2009, the band was in the final stages of the songwriting and rehearsal process for the album. Behemoth entered Radio Gdańsk studio in Poland to begin work on the album on 16 February 2009. The band managed to tap Daniel Bergstrand (Meshuggah, In Flames, Dark Funeral) to produce drums on the record. Bergstrand used some unconventional techniques—a big room for the drums to create ambience and 22-channel recording for a more "organic and natural" sound.

In March they were close to finish recording the guitars, with help from Wojciech and Sławomir Wiesławski from Studio Hertz. Within five days they completed three songs and laid down three rhythm guitars on each side, after which they worked on the bass, solos and vocals simultaneously.

The band also managed to tap Colin Richardson to mix the album. The band had tried to book him before for their previous album, The Apostasy, but he wasn't available then.

In early May, tracking was completed and on 12 May Nergal flew to the United Kingdom to join Colin Richardson to mix the record at Miloco Studios, London. Also in May, Metal Hammer was given the opportunity to listen to three fully completed songs in Miloco Studios. Nergal stated that this was the most relaxing and at the same time the most creative studio session he had ever been a part of.

== Track listing ==
All lyrics written by Nergal, except where noted. All music composed by Nergal.

No.	Title	Lyrics	Length
1.	"Daimonos"		5:15
2.	"Shemhamforash"		3:56
3.	"Ov Fire and the Void"		4:27
4.	"Transmigrating Beyond Realms ov Amenti"	Krzysztof Azarewicz	3:27
5.	"He Who Breeds Pestilence"		5:41
6.	"The Seed ov I"	Nergal; Krzysztof Azarewicz	4:58
7.	"Alas, Lord Is Upon Me"		3:15
8.	"Defiling Morality ov Black God"	Nergal; Krzysztof Azarewicz	2:49
9.	"Lucifer"	Tadeusz Miciński	8:06
Total length:			41:54

Japanese edition bonus track
No.	Title	Lyrics	Music	Length
10.	"Total Invasion" (Killing Joke cover)	Jaz Coleman	Geordie Walker; Martin Glover; Andy Gill	7:22
Total length:				49:16

Special edition DVD
No.	Title	Length
1.	"The Making of Evangelion" (documentary)	44:09
2.	"Evangelion Photo Session" (documentary)	6:40
Total length:		50:49

== Credits ==
Writing, performance and production credits are adapted from the album liner notes.

=== Personnel ===
==== Behemoth ====
- Nergal – guitar, vocals
- Inferno – drums, backing vocals on "Daimonos"
- Orion – bass, backing vocals on "Daimonos"

==== Session musicians ====
- Seth – guitar, backing vocals on "Daimonos"

==== Additional musicians ====
- Siegmar – samples, synthesizers
- Hevelius Brass quintet
  - Pawel Hulisz – trumpet
  - Piotr Kowalkowski – trumpet
  - Michal Szczerba – horn
  - Bogdan Kwiatek – trombone
  - Lukasz Gruba – tuba
- Boris "Hatefrost" Kalyuzhnyy – backing vocals on "Daimonos"
- Maciej "Manticore" Gruszka – backing vocals "Daimonos"
- Arkadiusz Malczewski – backing vocals "Daimonos"
- Tomasz "Ragaboy" Osiecki – sitar on "Shemhamforash"
- Maciej Maleńczuk – spoken word on "Lucifer"

==== Production ====
- Behemoth – production
- Daniel Bergstrand – co-production
- Sławomir Wiesławski – co-production
- Wojciech Wiesławski – co-production
- Colin Richardson – co-production, mixing
- Arkadiusz Malczewski – engineering
- Janusz Bryt – engineering
- Kuba Mańkowski – engineering
- Ted Jensen – Audio mastering

==== Visual art ====
- Nergal – cover concept
- Tomasz Daniłowicz – cover concept, cover design, artwork, mask design
- Macifj Boryna – photography
- Grupa13 – photography
- Kasjopea Michorowska – costume design
- Behemoth – make up
- Gellaturo – mask

=== Studios ===
- RG Studios, January 2009 E.V. - May 2009 – recording
- Musikbox, Miloco Studios, London, May 2009 – mixing
- Mastered in Sterling Studio, New York, May 2009 – mastering

== Charts ==
Chart	Peak position
Austrian Albums (Ö3 Austria)	45
Finnish Albums (Suomen virallinen lista)	17
French Albums (SNEP)	111
German Albums (Offizielle Top 100)	59
Polish Albums (ZPAV)	1
Swiss Albums (Schweizer Hitparade)	88
UK Independent Albums (Official Charts)	38
UK Rock & Metal Albums (Official Charts)	25
US Billboard 200	55
US Independent Albums Billboard	5
US Top Hard Rock Albums Billboard	5
US Top Rock Albums Billboard	17
US Top Tastemaker Albums Billboard	7

== Certifications ==
Region	Certification	Certified units/sales
Poland (ZPAV)	Gold	10,000^{*}
^{*} Sales figures based on certification alone.

== Release history ==
Region	Date	Label
Europe; Poland; Australia	7 August 2009	Nuclear Blast; Mystic Production; Riot Entertainment
United States	11 August 2009	Metal Blade
Japan	19 August 2009	Victor
South Korea	24 September 2009	Dope Entertainment
India	25 September 2009	Demonstealer Records
Russia	10 January 2010	Mazzar Records
