= The Apostasy =

Studio album by Behemoth
- Released: 17 July 2007
- Recorded: November 2006 – March 2007; Radio Gdańsk in Gdańsk, Poland
- Genre: Blackened death metal
- Length: 39:39
- Labels: Regain, Century Media, Mystic, Victor Entertainment
- Producers: Nergal, Arkadiusz Malczewski

Behemoth chronology
Demonica (2006)	The Apostasy (2007)	At the Arena ov Aion – Live Apostasy (2008)

Behemoth studio album chronology
Demigod (2004)	The Apostasy (2007)	Evangelion (2009)

Professional ratings
Review scores
Source	Rating
About.com	4.5/5 stars
AllMusic	3.5/5 stars
Blabbermouth.net	8/10 stars
Teraz Rock	4.5/5 stars
Decibel	8/10 stars
Metal Injection	9/10 stars
The Metallist	10/10 stars

The Apostasy is the eighth studio album by Polish extreme metal band Behemoth. The album was released on 17 July 2007 through Regain Records.

== Background ==
The Apostasy was recorded at the Radio Gdańsk Studios from November 2006 to March 2007. The record was then mixed by Daniel Bergstrand in the Dug Out Studio in Uppsala, Sweden in March 2007. Then it was mastered by Bjorn Engelmann in the Cutting Room Studios in Stockholm, Sweden also in March 2007.

Unlike Behemoth's previous studio albums, a piano and a horn section (a trio of trumpet, trombone, French horn) were used in several of the album's songs. During the recording sessions, the band re-recorded a new version of "Chant for Eschaton 2000" – originally released on their album Satanica – which was released on the band's 2008 EP, Ezkaton. The Apostasy is Behemoth's first album to chart on the Billboard 200, having debuted at #149. The album was also put out in vinyl format limited to 500 copies.

The album title refers to "apostasy", the state of having forsaken one's professed belief set, often in favour of opposing beliefs or causes. The album cover artwork is a depiction of the Hindu goddess Kali.

== Track listing ==
All lyrics are written by Nergal, except where noted; all music is composed by Nergal.

No.	Title	Lyrics	Length
1.	"Rome 64 C.E." (instrumental)		1:16
2.	"Slaying the Prophets ov Isa"		3:23
3.	"Prometherion"		3:03
4.	"At the Left Hand ov God"	Nergal, Krzysztof Azarewicz	4:58
5.	"Kriegsphilosophie"		4:23
6.	"Be Without Fear"		3:17
7.	"Arcana Hereticae"	Nergal, Krzysztof Azarewicz	2:58
8.	"Libertheme"		4:53
9.	"Inner Sanctum"		5:01
10.	"Pazuzu"		2:37
11.	"Christgrinding Avenue"		3:50
Total length:			39:39

Japanese edition bonus tracks
No.	Title	Lyrics	Music	Length
12.	"Entering the Pylon ov Light"	Krzysztof Azarewicz	Nergal	3:42
13.	"Slaves Shall Serve" (live)	Krzysztof Azarewicz	Nergal	3:27
Total length:				46:48

Special edition DVD
No.	Title	Length
1.	"Making of the Apostasy" (documentary)	25:28

== Explanation of song titles ==
- "Rome 64 C.E." – the Great Fire of Rome occurred in 64 C.E., in which Peter from the bible (and possible other apostles as well), were allegedly killed. This explains the name of the song "Slaying the Prophets ov Isa".
- "Slaying the Prophets ov Isa" – Isa is the Arabic name for Jesus.
- "Prometherion" is a portmanteau of Prometheus (Greek: Προμηθεύς; "forethought") and Therion (Greek: θηρίον; "wild animal" or "beast").
- "At the Left Hand ov God" is referring to the left-hand path
- "Kriegsphilosophie" is German for "philosophy of war".
- "Pazuzu" – the Pazuzu was a much-feared creature of legend in Mesopotamian mythology, with a deformed head, wings of an eagle, sharp claws of a lion on its feet, and tail of a scorpion. It is the personification of the south-east storm wind, which brings diseases.
- "Christgrinding Avenue" talks about the Via Dolorosa and the crucifixion of Jesus.

== Personnel ==
Behemoth

- Adam "Nergal" Darski – guitar, lead vocals, acoustic guitar
- Zbigniew Robert "Inferno" Promiński – drums, percussion
- Tomasz "Orion" Wróblewski – bass, additional vocals

Additional musicians

- Patryk Dominik "Seth" Sztyber – guitar, additional backing vocals
- Leszek Możdżer – piano on Inner Sanctum
- Warrel Dane (Nevermore) – vocals on Inner Sanctum
- Piotr Głuch (Manthu) – trumpet, trumpet arrangements
- Jacek Swedrzynski (Kyrios) – French horn
- Marcin Dziecielewski (Majestic) – trombone
- Hanna Kwiatkowska (Cappella Gedanensis) – soprano
- Anna Asmus (Cappella Gedanensis) – soprano
- Sylwia Falecka (Cappella Gedanensis) – alto
- Tamara Hejka–Grom (Cappella Gedanensis) – alto
- Piotr Macalak (Cappella Gedanensis) – basso
- Franciszek Iskrzycki (Academic Choir of the University of Gdansk) – tenor
- Grzegorz Zieba (Academic Choir of the University of Gdansk) – tenor

Production

- Krzysztof Azarewicz – incantations, spells
- Adam "Nergal" Darski – choir arrangements
- Kuba Mankowski (Pnemua) – choral arrangements
- Piotr Banka – trumpet arrangements
- Arkadiusz "Malta" Malczewski – sound engineering, co–production
- Marcin Malinowski – assistant engineer
- Daniel Bergstrand – mixing
- Bjorn Engelmann – mastering
- Tomasz "Graal" Danilowicz – cover concept, design and artwork, mask design
- Krzysztof "Sado" Sadowski – band photography
- Zbigniew Jozwik – mask sculpture
- Sharon E. Wennekers – grammatical consultations

Note

- Recorded at RG Studios November 2006 - March 2007.
- Mixed in Dug Out Studio, Uppsala, March 2007.
- Mastered in Cutting Room Studio, Stockholm, March 2007.
- Samples on track IX recorded in Ilaga Sophia, Turkey, 2006.
- Samples on track X recorded in Swayambunath Stupa, Kathmandu, Nepal, 2005.

== Charts ==
Chart	Peak position
Polish Albums (ZPAV)	9
UK Independent Albums (Official Charts)	38
US Billboard 200	149
US Heatseekers Albums (Billboard)	2
US Top Hard Rock Albums (Billboard)	24

== Release history ==
Region	Date	Label
Europe, Poland	2 July 2007	Regain Records/Mystic Production
United States	17 July 2007	Century Media Records
Russia	30 July 2007	CD-Maximum
Japan	21 September 2007	Victor Entertainment
