= Abyssus Abyssum Invocat =

Compilation album by Behemoth
- Released: 16 May 2011
- Genre: Death metal; black metal
- Label: Peaceville, Metal Blade
- Producer: Adam "Nergal" Darski

Behemoth chronology
Evangelia Heretika (2010)	Abyssus Abyssum Invocat (2011)	Blow Your Trumpets Gabriel (2013)

Professional ratings
Review scores
Source	Rating
AllMusic	4/5 stars
About.com	3.5/5 stars

Abyssus Abyssum Invocat is the second compilation album by Polish extreme metal band Behemoth. It includes two EPs (Conjuration and Slaves Shall Serve) and five previously unreleased live recordings.

== Track listing ==
All music composed by Nergal and all lyrics written by Krzysztof Azarewicz, except where noted.

Disc 1, Conjuration
No.	Title	Lyrics	Music	Length
1.	"Conjuration of Sleep Daemons"		Nergal, Havoc, Inferno	3:24
2.	"Wish" (Nine Inch Nails cover)	Trent Reznor	Trent Reznor	3:37
3.	"Welcome to Hell" (Venom cover)	Conrad Lant, Anthony Bray	Conrad Lant, Anthony Bray	3:15
4.	"Christians to the Lions" (live)	Nergal		3:49
5.	"Decade of Therion" (live)			3:47
6.	"From the Pagan Vastlands" (live, bonus track)	Tomasz Krajewski		3:38
7.	"Antichristian Phenomenon" (live)	Nergal		5:05
8.	"Lam" (live, bonus track)			4:25
9.	"Satan's Sword (I Have Become)" (live, bonus track)	Nergal		4:03
10.	"Chant for Eskaton 2000" (live)			6:50

Disc 2, Slaves Shall Serve
No.	Title	Lyrics	Music	Length
1.	"Slaves Shall Serve"			3:04
2.	"Entering the Pylon ov Light"			3:42
3.	"Penetration" (The Nefilim cover)	Carl McCoy	McCoy, Houchin, Miles, Rippin	3:10
4.	"Until You Call on the Dark" (Danzig cover)	Glenn Danzig	Glenn Danzig	4:25
5.	"Demigod (Live)"	Nergal		3:20
6.	"Slaves Shall Serve (Live)"			3:26
7.	"Lam (Live)" (bonus track)			4:27
8.	"As Above So Below (Live)" (bonus track)			5:59

== Release history ==
Region	Date	Label
UK	16 May 2011	Peaceville Records
United States	7 June 2011	Metal Blade Records
