= The Satanist (album) =

- Cover art (containing Nergal's blood) by Denis Forkas

Studio album by Behemoth
- Released: 3 February 2014
- Recorded: February – June 2013
- Studios: Hertz Studio (Białystok, Poland), RG Studio (Gdańsk, Poland)
- Genre: Blackened death metal
- Length: 44:17
- Languages: English; Polish; Latin
- Labels: Nuclear Blast; Metal Blade; Mystic; JVC Kenwood Victor; EVP
- Producers: Behemoth; Daniel Bergstrand; Wojciech Wiesławski; Sławomir Wiesławski

Behemoth chronology
Blow Your Trumpets Gabriel (2013)	The Satanist (2014)	Live Barbarossa (2014)

Behemoth studio album chronology
Evangelion (2009)	The Satanist (2014)	I Loved You at Your Darkest (2018)

Singles from The Satanist
- 1. "Blow Your Trumpets Gabriel" Released: 4 December 2013; 2. "Ora Pro Nobis Lucifer" Released: 3 December 2014; 3. "Messe Noire" Released: 8 April 2015

Alternative cover
- Alternative LP edition cover art

The Satanist is the tenth studio album by Polish extreme metal band Behemoth. The album was announced on 31 May 2013 and released on 3 February 2014, through Nuclear Blast and on 4 February in Poland via Metal Blade Records and Mystic Production, respectively. Release was preceded by digital download single "Blow Your Trumpets Gabriel" and 12" EP under the same title released on 4 December 2013.

== Background and history ==
"Ora Pro Nobis Lucifer" music video

The Satanist was recorded between February and June 2013 in Hertz Studio in Białystok, and RG Studio in Gdańsk, both in Poland, produced by Behemoth, Daniel Bergstrand, and the Wiesławscy Brothers. The album was mixed by Matt Hyde at Hydeaway Studios in Los Angeles, and mastered by Ted Jensen at Sterling Sound in New York City. Colin Richardson was the initial producer for the album, but stepped down after four weeks due to creative differences.

A music video was shot for the song "Blow Your Trumpets Gabriel" which was produced and directed by Grupa 13, and Dariusz Szermanowicz. The video premiered on the Behemoth YouTube channel on 3 December 2013.

On 7 January 2014, Behemoth released the first part of their video prologue for this album. Subsequently, the second part was released on January, 14, the third part was released on January, 21, and the fourth part was released on January, 29. Earlier, on 28 January, the official lyric video for the song "Ora Pro Nobis Lucifer" was released.

The song "In the Absence ov Light" contains a spoken word quote from the Witold Gombrowicz drama The Marriage (pol. Ślub) which states:

I reject all order, all ideas / I trust no abstraction, no doctrine / I don't believe in god, nor in mind / Forget all gods! I don't believe in God. Give me man! / May he be like me, troubled and immature / confused and incomplete, dark and obscure so that I can dance with him!/ Pretend to him! Ingratiate myself with him! / And rape him, love him and forge myself / Anew from him, so I can grow through him, and in / that way / Celebrate my marriage in the sacred human church!.

== Critical reception and legacy ==
Professional ratings
Aggregate scores
Source	Rating
Metacritic	92/100
Review scores
Source	Rating
AllMusic	4/5 stars
Exclaim!	7/10
The Guardian	5/5 stars
Loudwire	4.5/5 stars
Pitchfork	8.2/10
PopMatters	9/10
Rock Sound	9/10
Spin	8/10
Teraz Rock	4.5/5 stars
Terrorizer	9.5/10

The Satanist received acclaim from critics. At Metacritic, which assigns a normalized rating out of 100 to reviews from critics, the album received an average score of 92, which indicates "universal acclaim", based on 10 reviews. Joe DiVita of Loudwire noted that the album "sees the band shed away that skin as they simultaneously get back to some of their blackened roots while exploring new areas with… dynamic songwriting". The album claimed the top spot on Loudwire's list of the best metal albums of 2014, with Loudwire hailing it "a masterpiece from beginning to end, with absolutely no filler".

Grayson Currin of Pitchfork wrote: "The Satanist is a terrific coil of most everything Behemoth have ever done well, a strangely hopeful vision of hell wrested away from its very grip." The editorial staff of Dutch webzine Lords of Metal named it the third best album of 2014, after a score of 93/100 for the initial album review.

In 2019 the album was voted the "Best Metal Album of the Decade" by publications such as Loudwire, Consequence of Sound and others.

"It's a really intense album," observed comedian Bill Bailey. "And the music is so orchestral, almost: the guitars layered on and this sort of tornado of drums… It's epic. I listen to it when I'm cycling."

== Track listing ==
All music composed by Nergal. All arrangements by Behemoth. All lyrics written by Nergal, except where noted.

No.	Title	Lyrics	Length
1.	"Blow Your Trumpets Gabriel"		4:25
2.	"Furor Divinus"		3:06
3.	"Messe Noire"	Nergal; Krzysztof Azarewicz	4:04
4.	"Ora Pro Nobis Lucifer"	Nergal; Azarewicz	5:35
5.	"Amen"		3:49
6.	"The Satanist"		5:33
7.	"Ben Sahar"		5:34
8.	"In the Absence ov Light"		4:58
9.	"O Father O Satan O Sun!"	Nergal; Azarewicz	7:13
Total length:			44:17

Australian edition bonus track
No.	Title	Lyrics	Music	Length
10.	"Ludzie Wschodu" (Siekiera cover)	Tomasz Adamski	Adamski	4:11

Japanese edition bonus tracks
No.	Title	Lyrics	Music	Length
10.	"Ludzie Wschodu" (Siekiera cover)	Tomasz Adamski	Adamski	4:11
11.	"Chant for Ezkaton 2000 E.V."	Krzysztof Azarewicz		5:10
12.	"Qadosh"	Azarewicz		5:00

Special edition DVD (Live Barbarossa – Behemoth 26 September 2012, Ekaterinburg, Russia)
No.	Title	Lyrics	Length
1.	"Intro" (instrumental)		2:44
2.	"Ov Fire and the Void"	Nergal	4:38
3.	"Demigod"	Nergal	4:11
4.	"Moonspell Rites"	Nergal	7:20
5.	"Conquer All"	Nergal	4:09
6.	"Christians to the Lions"	Nergal	5:05
7.	"The Seed ov I"	Nergal; Krzysztof Azarewicz	5:40
8.	"Alas, Lord is Upon Me"	Nergal	3:59
9.	"Decade ov Therion"	Azarewicz	3:46
10.	"At the Left Hand ov God"	Nergal; Azarewicz	5:11
11.	"Slaves Shall Serve"	Azarewicz	3:37
12.	"Chant for Ezkaton 2000 E.V."	Azarewicz	6:50
13.	"23 (The Youth Manifesto)"	Nergal	4:33
14.	"Lucifer"	Tadeusz Miciński	9:34
15.	"The Satanist: Oblivion" (documentary)		25:04

== Personnel ==
Production and performance credits are adapted from the album liner notes.

Behemoth

- Adam "Nergal" Darski – guitar, vocals, lyrics
- Tomasz "Orion" Wróblewski – bass
- Zbigniew Robert "Inferno" Promiński – drums

Production

- Wojciech Wiesławski – producer, engineering
- Sławomir Wiesławski – producer, engineering
- Daniel Bergstrand – producer
- Matt Hyde – mixing
- Ted Jensen – mastering
- Urban Näsvall – drum technician
- Denis "Forkas" Kostromitin (Денис "Форкас" Костромитин) – cover art
- Metastazis (Jean-Emmanuel "Valnoir" Simoulin) – additional design
- Zbigniew Bielak – additional design
- Arkadiusz "Malta" Malczewski – mixing, mastering (DVD)
- Grupa 13 – producer (DVD; Documentary)
- Aga Krysiuk – filmmaker (DVD; Documentary)
- Iwo Ledwozyw – filmmaker (DVD; Documentary)

Additional musicians

- Patryk Dominik "Seth" Sztyber – guitar
- Michał Łapaj (Riverside) – keyboards, hammond organ on "O Father O Satan O Sun!" and "The Satanist"
- Krzysztof "Siegmar" Oloś (Vesania) – samples
- Krzysztof Azarewicz – lyrics
- Jan "Dziablas" Galbas (Octopussy) – backing vocals on "O Father O Satan O Sun!"
- Artur Jurek (Sanacja) – orchestrations
- Marcin Janek (Durys Band) – saxophone on "In the Absence ov Light"
- Grażyna Michalec (Polish Chamber Orchestra Sopot) – cello
- Magda Miotke-Bajerska (Polish Chamber Orchestra Sopot) – cello
- Alicja Leoniuk-Kit (Polish Chamber Orchestra Sopot) – cello
- Pawel Hulisz (Hevelius Brass quintet) – flugelhorn, trumpet
- Michał Szczerba (Hevelius Brass quintet) – French horn
- Łukasz Lacny (Hevelius Brass quintet) – French horn
- Bogdan Kwiatek (Hevelius Brass quintet) – trombone
- Adam Sierżęga – percussion (uncredited, track 10; DVD)

Note

- Recorded at Hertz Studio in Białystok, Poland, Feb–June 2013
- Additional recording at Dug-Out, Radio Gdańsk, Soundsgreat Studio
- Mixed at Hydeaway Studio, Los Angeles, Aug–Sept 2013
- Mastered at Sterling Sound, New York City, Sept–Oct 2013
- 'Live Barbarossa' was filmed during Phoenix Rising tour in Ekaterinburg, Russia, Sept 2012

== Release history ==
Region	Date	Label
Europe	3 February 2014	Nuclear Blast
United States	February 4, 2014	Metal Blade
Poland	February 4, 2014	Mystic
Japan	5 February 2014	JVC Kenwood Victor
Australia	7 February 2014	EVP
CIS	18 February 2014	New Aeon Musick/Фоно/Metal Star

== Charts ==
Chart (2014)	Peak position
Australian Albums (ARIA)	78
Austrian Albums (Ö3 Austria)	24
Belgian Albums (Ultratop Flanders)	88
Belgian Albums (Ultratop Wallonia)	74
Canadian Albums Chart	46
Czech Albums (ČNS IFPI)	14
Danish Albums (Hitlisten)	34
Dutch Albums (Album Top 100)	70
Finnish Albums (Suomen virallinen lista)	7
French Albums (SNEP)	52
German Albums (Offizielle Top 100)	11
Japanese Albums (Oricon)	86
Polish Albums (ZPAV)	1
Scottish Albums (Official Charts)	64
Swedish Albums (Sverigetopplistan)	45
Swiss Albums (Schweizer Hitparade)	33
UK Albums (Official Charts)	57
UK Independent Albums (Official Charts)	11
UK Rock & Metal Albums (Official Charts)	4
US Billboard 200	34
US Independent Albums	6
US Top Rock Albums	9
US Top Hard Rock Albums	4
US Top Tastemaker Albums	3
