= The Shit Ov God =

Studio album by Behemoth
- Released: 9 May 2025
- Genre: Blackened death metal
- Length: 37:54
- Label: Nuclear Blast

Behemoth chronology
Opvs Contra Natvram (2022)	The Shit Ov God (2025)	I, Scvlptor (2026)

Singles from The Shit Ov God
- 1. "The Shit Ov God" Released: 29 January 2025; 2. "The Shadow Elite" Released: 5 March 2025; 3. "Sowing Salt" Released: 9 May 2025

The Shit Ov God is the thirteenth studio album by Polish blackened death metal band Behemoth. It was released on 9 May 2025, by Nuclear Blast Records. The album's lead single, "The Shit Ov God", was released in January 2025.

== Reception ==
Professional ratings
Review scores
Source	Rating
Blabbermouth	9/10 stars
Distorted Sound	8/10 stars
Kerrang!	4/5 stars
MusicOMH	3.5/5 stars
Sputnikmusic	2.3/5

Dom Lawson of Blabbermouth rated the album nine out of ten, describing it as Behemoth's "finest album in a decade". Kerrang!'s Sam Law noted, "The Shit Ov God is such compelling proof of the indefatigable courage of their convictions and the transcendental power of musical darkness," and assigned the album a rating of four out of five.

Tim Bolitho-Jones of Distorted Sound gave it a score of eight out of ten, remarking, "This is rich, opulent, blackened death metal and a timely reminder that even the most brutal music can be irresistibly catchy". MusicOMH's Sam Shepherd rated it 3.5 stars, calling it "an album that works really well as a whole and has a few really standout moments."

Benjamin Jack of Sputnikmusic rated it as below average with a score of 2.3 out of five, commenting that "it's disappointing that more effort hasn't been made on Sh*t to justify their infamy in a more meaningful way."

== Track listing ==
The Shit Ov God track listing
No.	Title	Length
1.	"The Shadow Elite"	4:39
2.	"Sowing Salt"	3:07
3.	"The Shit Ov God"	5:36
4.	"Lvciferaeon"	4:16
5.	"To Drown the Svn in Wine"	3:29
6.	"Nomen Barbarvm"	5:03
7.	"O Venvs, Come!"	5:55
8.	"Avgvr (The Dread Vvltvre)"	5:49
Total length:		37:54

Japanese edition bonus tracks
No.	Title	Length
9.	"The Thousand Plagues I Witness" (live)	7:09
10.	"Demigod" (live)	3:35
Total length:		48:38

== Charts ==
Chart performance for The Shit Ov God
Chart (2025)	Peak position
Austrian Albums (Ö3 Austria)	4
Belgian Albums (Ultratop Flanders)	43
Belgian Albums (Ultratop Wallonia)	95
Finnish Albums (Suomen virallinen lista)	32
French Albums (SNEP)	133
French Rock & Metal Albums (SNEP)	9
German Albums (Offizielle Top 100)	19
Polish Albums (ZPAV)	1
Scottish Albums (Official Charts)	68
Swedish Albums (Sverigetopplistan)	60
Swedish Hard Rock Albums (Sverigetopplistan)	5
Swiss Albums (Schweizer Hitparade)	12
UK Album Downloads (Official Charts)	31
UK Independent Albums (Official Charts)	20
UK Rock & Metal Albums (Official Charts)	7
