= Behemoth (band) =

Polish blackened death metal band

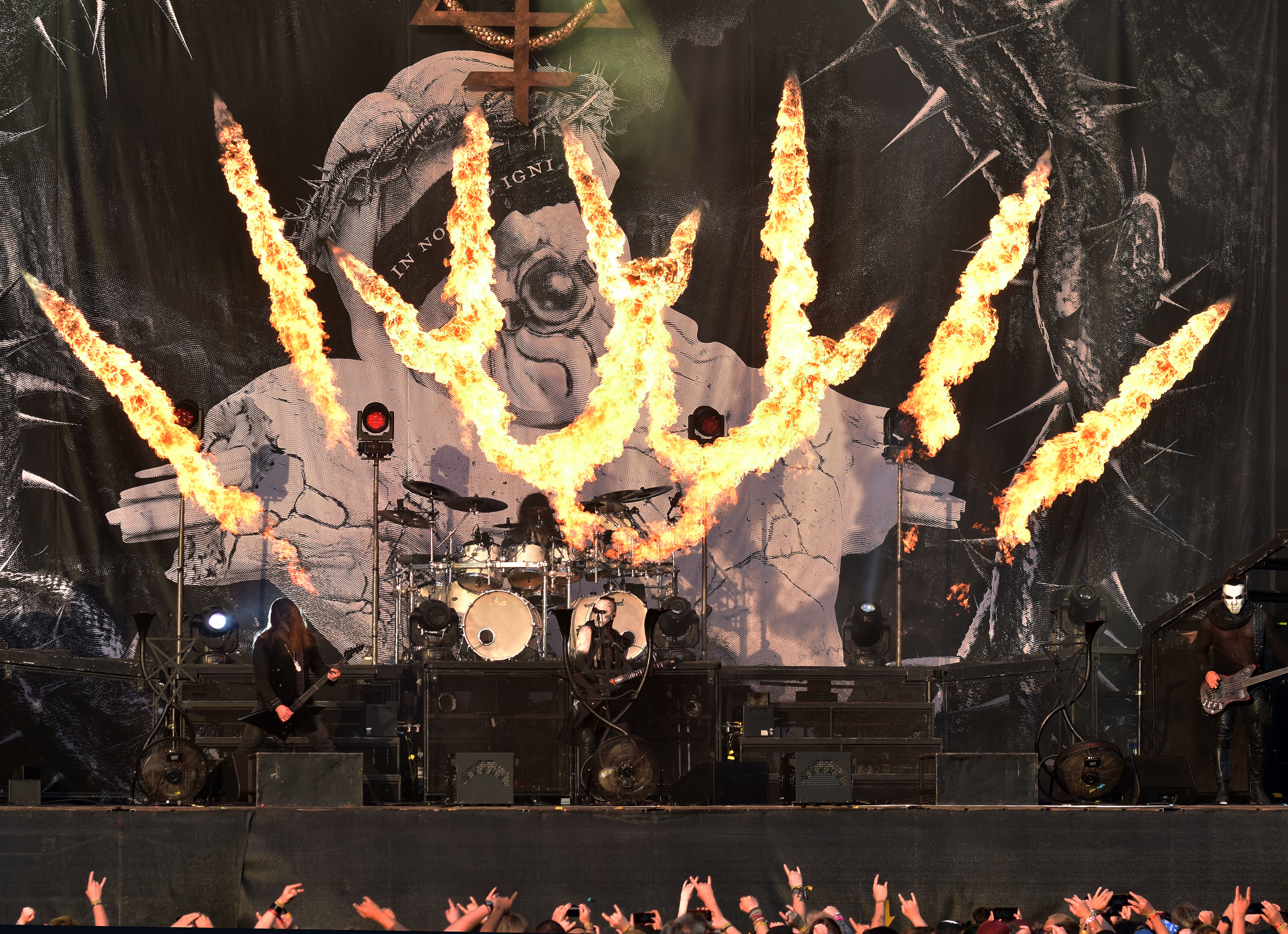
- Behemoth in 2024

Background information
- Origin: Gdańsk, Poland
- Genres: Blackened death metal; black metal (early)
- Years active: 1991–present
- Labels: Metal Blade; Nuclear Blast; Wild Rags; Pagan; Avantgarde; Regain; Century Media; Mystic Production
- Members: Nergal; Inferno; Orion; Seth
- Past members: Baal Ravenlock; Desecrator; Frost; Orcus; Les; Mefisto; Havoc
- Website: www.behemoth.pl

Behemoth is a Polish blackened death metal band from Gdańsk, formed in 1991. They are considered important in establishing the Polish extreme metal underground with Vader and Hate.

Behemoth have been referred to as "a leading light in the Polish metal scene." The band's releases have received acclaim from major publications. In 2016, the staff of Loudwire named them the 50th-best metal band of all time.

== History ==
=== Early career and first five albums (1991–2000) ===
Behemoth was formed in 1991 as a trio, with Nergal on lead guitar and vocals, Baal on drums, and Desecrator on rhythm guitar. They started with the demos Endless Damnation, and The Return of the Northern Moon. The most significant was the fourth demo, ...From the Pagan Vastlands (1994). This tape was released by Polish label Pagan Records, and later through Wild Rags. Their next release was their debut studio album, Sventevith (Storming Near the Baltic), in 1995. A year later, they recorded their second album, Grom, released in 1996. Grom features many influences and musical styles, using female vocals, acoustic guitars, and synthesizers. At the same time, Behemoth gained experience playing live shows in its native country and touring Europe. Two years later, the band recorded a third album, Pandemonic Incantations. Their increasing presence in metal media set a new standard for them. Due to a lack of promotion, the album was not well publicized. After another extensive tour, Behemoth signed a two-album deal with Italy's Avantgarde Music in the fall of 1998. The first result of this collaboration was the successful album Satanica, on which the black metal sound had evolved into blackened death metal.

The label secured two European tours for the band supporting Deicide and Satyricon respectively. During that period, Behemoth went through line-up changes and had problems with their ex-Polish label. By the time Satanica came out, Inferno and Les had left the band. Nergal looked for new members but could not find a new drummer. Inferno returned to the band in early 2000, along with new members Novy (formerly of Devilyn, Vader and Dies Irae) on bass, and guitarist Havok. After the line-up changes, Behemoth signed with Polish label Mystic Production. The follow-up to Satanica was Thelema.6. Massive guitar parts and precise drumming, with different influences, saw them progress further towards blackened death metal.

Thelema.6 was supported by the worldwide press and media, including official releases in Russia and Brazil for the first time. Continuing the support for Thelema.6, Behemoth appeared in several live events like Wacken Open Air, With Full Force, Inferno Metal Festival, Mystic Festival, and Mind Over Matter Autumn. They started their first headlining tour with Carpathian Forest and Khold, followed by a festival tour in Poland, Thrash em All Fest., with Vader and Krisiun, among others.

=== Zos Kia Cultus (Here and Beyond), Demigod and The Apostasy (2001–2008) ===
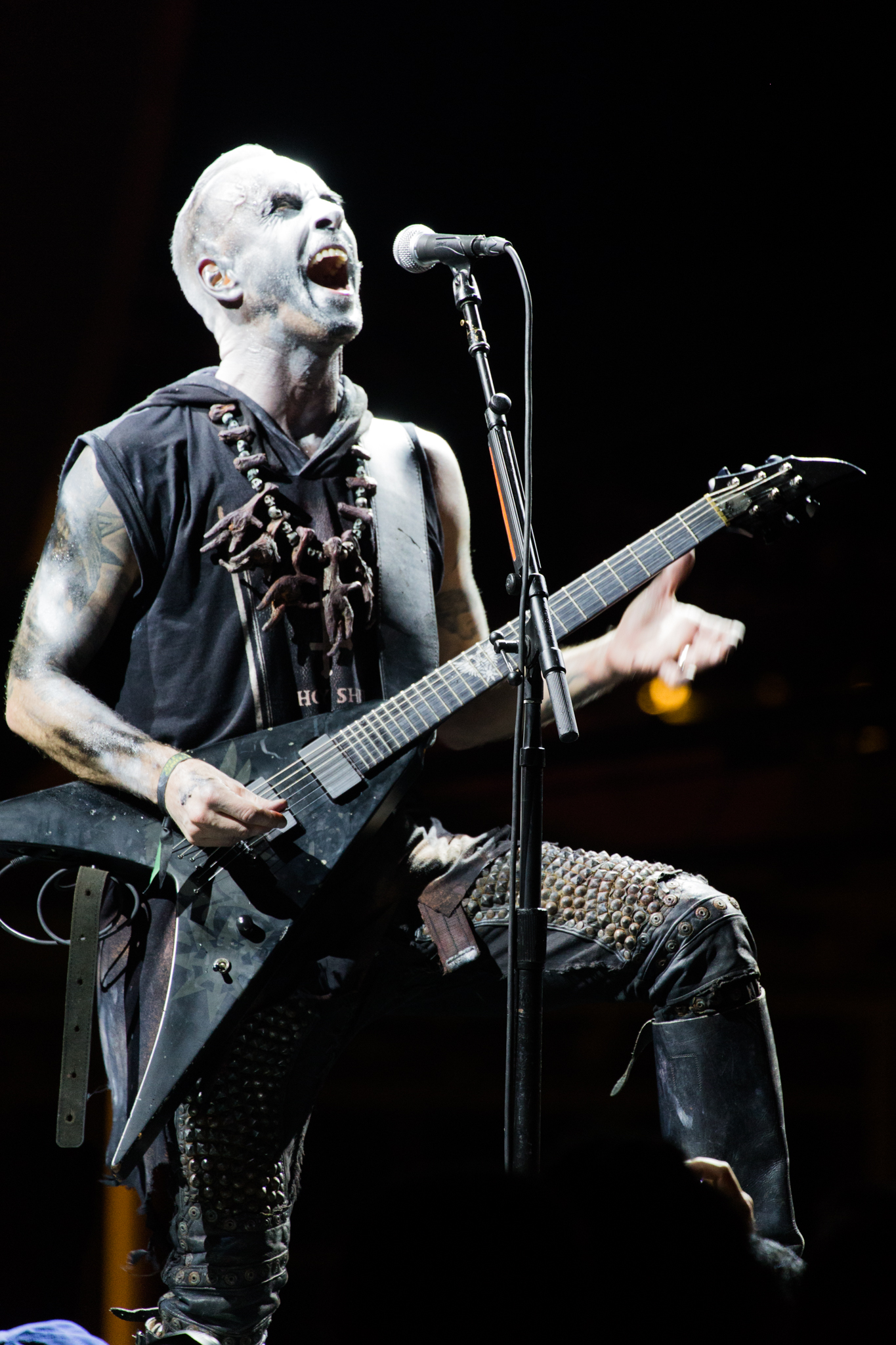
Nergal in 2015

In 2001, Behemoth focused on writing new material for a sixth studio album. Meanwhile, they completed their second headlining tour in Russia, Belarus and Ukraine. Having finished their new songs, Behemoth entered Hendrix Studio and produced Zos Kia Cultus (Here and Beyond) with sound engineer Arkadiusz Malczewski.

In February 2003, the band started their first Norwegian tour, playing in Bergen, Oslo and Stavanger. On 11 March 2003, the American premiere, scheduled by Century Media Records, headlined Behemoth's first appearance in the American continent. The tour started on 9 March at New Jersey's Metalfest and continued with a number of shows across America and Canada with Deicide, Revenge, Vehemence and Amon Amarth. Shortly after their first US tour, Glenn Danzig invited the band to join the Blackest of the Black Tour, which included Danzig, Superjoint Ritual, Nile, and Opeth. In fall 2003, Behemoth flew to the US to complete their third tour with Six Feet Under, Skinless and The Black Dahlia Murder. The band played at the Tuska Festival in Finland with Ministry, Soulfly, among others. At that time, due to line-up difficulties, Nergal parted ways with Havok and Novy, who decided to focus on their own bands. The band resumed touring in the UK and Europe.

In 2004, their seventh studio album, Demigod, was released to good critical response. Recorded at Hendrix Studios, the album debuted at number 15 on the national Polish album charts. Music videos for the songs "Conquer All" and "Slaves Shall Serve" were shot. In fall 2005, the band headlined the Demigod supremacy Canadian tour 2005 with Necronomicon.

In 2007, the band toured Europe with Napalm Death, Moonspell and Dew-Scented. Behemoth released their eighth studio album, The Apostasy, in July of that year. It was recorded at Radio Gdańsk studio in December 2006. Shortly after the release of The Apostasy, the band was featured as one of Ozzfest 2007's second stage headliners, one of four non-US bands playing that year. In October/November 2007, they played their first US headlining tour with Job for a Cowboy, Gojira, and Beneath the Massacre. In October/November 2007 the band toured Europe with Canadian death metal group Kataklysm and Belgium's Aborted.

In February 2008, Behemoth began a headlining tour with Suicide Silence. In April/May 2008, the band toured North America as part of "The Invaluable Darkness" tour with Keep of Kalessin and headliner Dimmu Borgir. Behemoth spent the summer playing prominent festivals all over Europe.

In October 2008, Behemoth released their first live album, At the Arena ov Aion – Live Apostasy. Also, an EP called Ezkaton was released featuring a re-recorded version of Chant for Eschaton 2000, one new song, two covers (Master's Hammer, together with Root members Igor Hubik and Big Boss, and Ramones), and three live songs. The EP was released in North America on 11 November.

=== Evangelion (2009–2010) ===
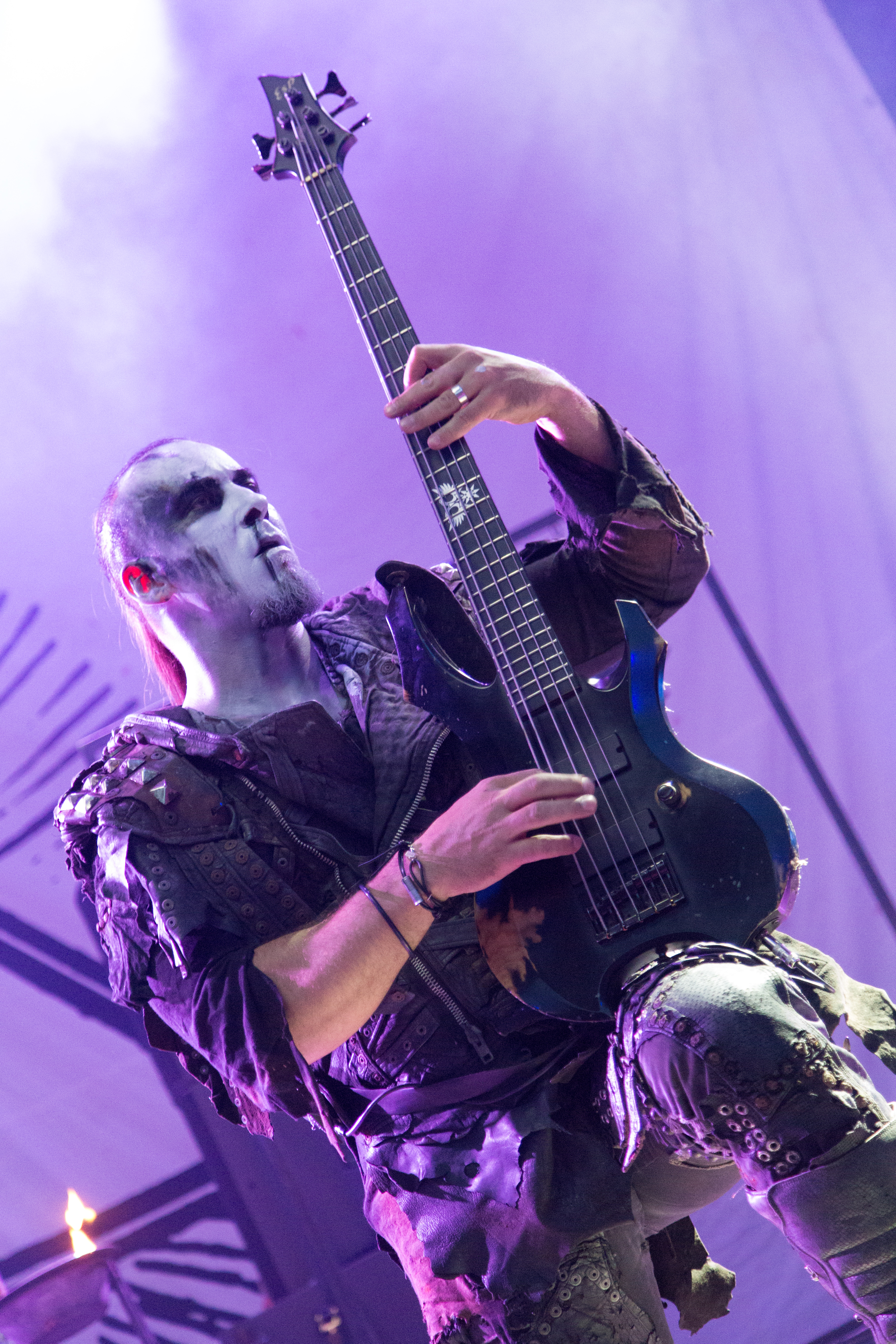
Orion in 2017

In March 2009, the band suggested that the new album, due in the summer, be produced by British producer Colin Richardson. Behemoth released its ninth full-length album, Evangelion, on 9 August via Nuclear Blast in Europe and 11 August via Metal Blade in US. "Shemhamforash", a track from this album, was released in July 2009 on their MySpace profile.

In July and August 2009, Behemoth participated in the Rockstar Mayhem Festival with Slayer, Bullet for My Valentine, All That Remains, Trivium, Marilyn Manson, Cannibal Corpse and Job for a Cowboy. In September 2009, Behemoth headlined the "New Evangelion" Polish tour with Azarath, Black River and Hermh.

In January 2010, Behemoth toured North America during "Evangelia Amerika Tour". In March, they toured Europe with shows in Scandinavia, Greece and Turkey. In April, Behemoth toured Japan, Australia and New Zealand. In May, they started the European "Evangelion Summer Campaign 2010" with shows on open-air festivals in Austria, Switzerland, Germany, Sweden, Denmark and Poland. In June and July, they toured France, Spain, Portugal, Italy, Belgium, Switzerland, Turkey, Serbia and Croatia with Decapitated and Ex Deo. In July and August, they performed on open-air festivals in Czech Republic and Poland.

=== Nergal's illness, recovery and The Satanist (2010–2016) ===
In August 2010, Nergal was hospitalized and was diagnosed with leukemia. It was falsely reported that his leukemia was so advanced that chemotherapy couldn't help him. Doda, his girlfriend at that time, offered her bone marrow for a transplant but she wasn't a match. A donor was subsequently found. Behemoth cancelled all upcoming shows in August, including the Sonisphere Festival in Finland, concerts in Russia, Belarus and Baltic States in September and October, and their North American tour "Lawless States of Heretika" with Watain, Withered and Black Anvil in November and December.

Behemoth's live DVD Evangelia Heretika was released on 9 November 2010. The DVD package includes two DVDs featuring Live in Warsaw 2009, Live in Paris 2008, Documentaries, Bonus Material and an Audio CD.

On 17 January 2011, Nergal left the hematology division of Uniwersyteckie Centrum Kliniczne, four weeks after undergoing a bone marrow transplant. He said that he would spend several months recovering in his flat in one of the Gdańsk's districts to restore his physical condition. He announced that he looked forward to resume playing the guitar after six months. He said that he had a huge motivation and desire to continue his work with the band, thanking all people who helped him.

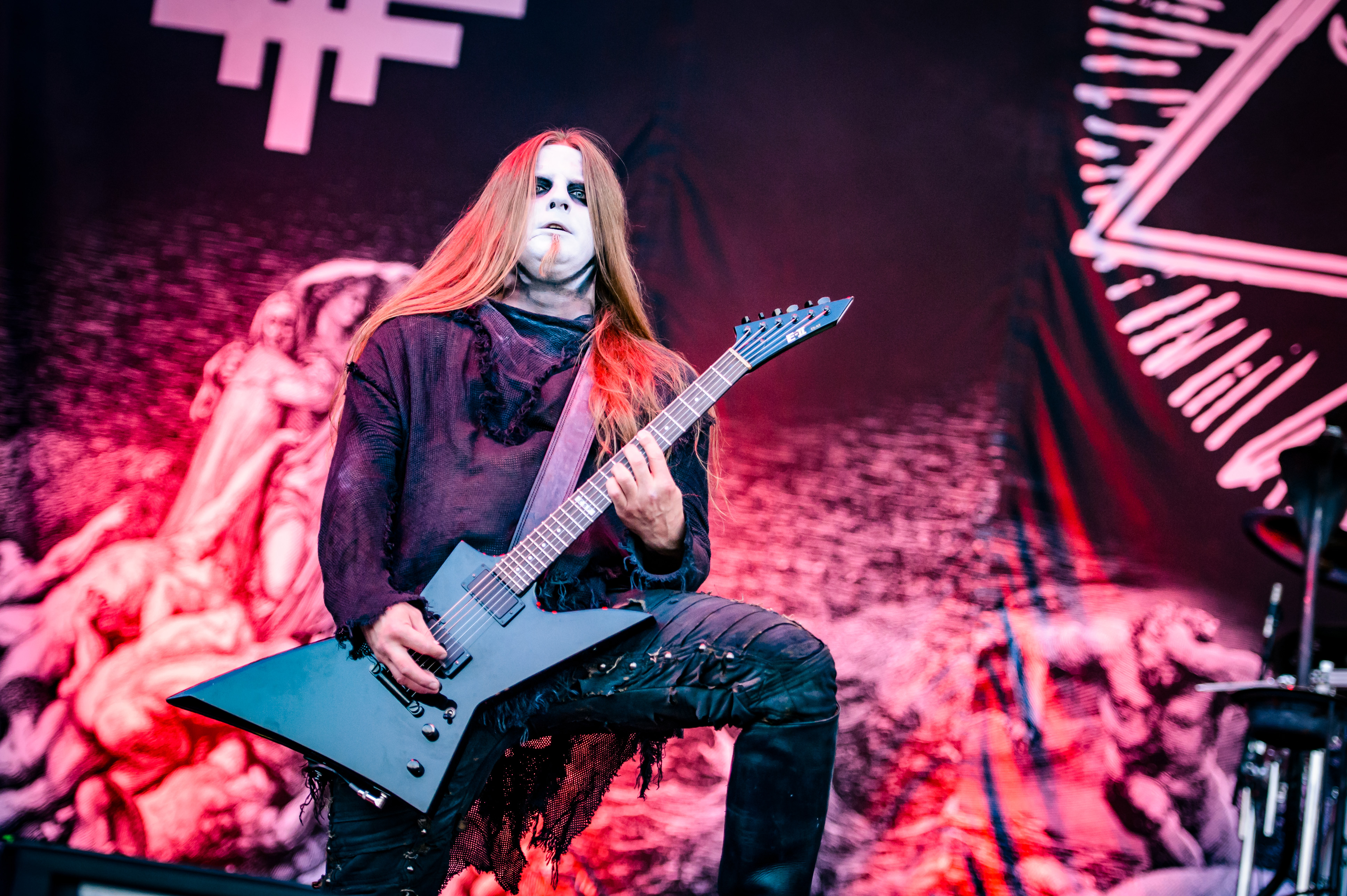
Guitarist Patryk "Seth" Sztyber in 2018

According to Nergal, a new album and tour for 2012 were in the works.

In an April 18, 2012 interview with Blabbermouth, Nergal stated the new album's possible release date to be in the middle of 2013, and added, "But, I can tell you that there are at least three or four rough sketches of songs, just ideas. Main riffs, main themes. We will be building around these ideas, so about one-third of the album is underway."

The band was slated to play the 2013 Mayhem Festival with Amon Amarth, Rob Zombie, Mastodon, Children of Bodom and others, but cancelled due to drummer Inferno needing appendix surgery.

On May 30, 2013, Behemoth announced that the title of their tenth studio album would be The Satanist. It was released on 3 February 2014 and received widespread acclaim from critics and audiences. On 26 February 2014, the band was announced to be playing Download Festival in June. On 27 July 2014, Behemoth headlined the Carpathian Alliance Open Air Metal Festival in Ukraine. Behemoth scheduled a North American tour in early 2015, co-headlining with Cannibal Corpse with support from Aeon and Tribulation.

On August 9, 2015, Behemoth were announced as the special guests at Bloodstock Open Air in 2016, playing The Satanist in its entirety on Friday, 12 August 2016.

Due to Inferno becoming a father in July 2017, Jon "the Charn" Rice replaced him on drums at the American summer tour with Slayer and Lamb of God.

=== I Loved You at Your Darkest, Opvs Contra Natvram and The Shit ov God (2016–present) ===
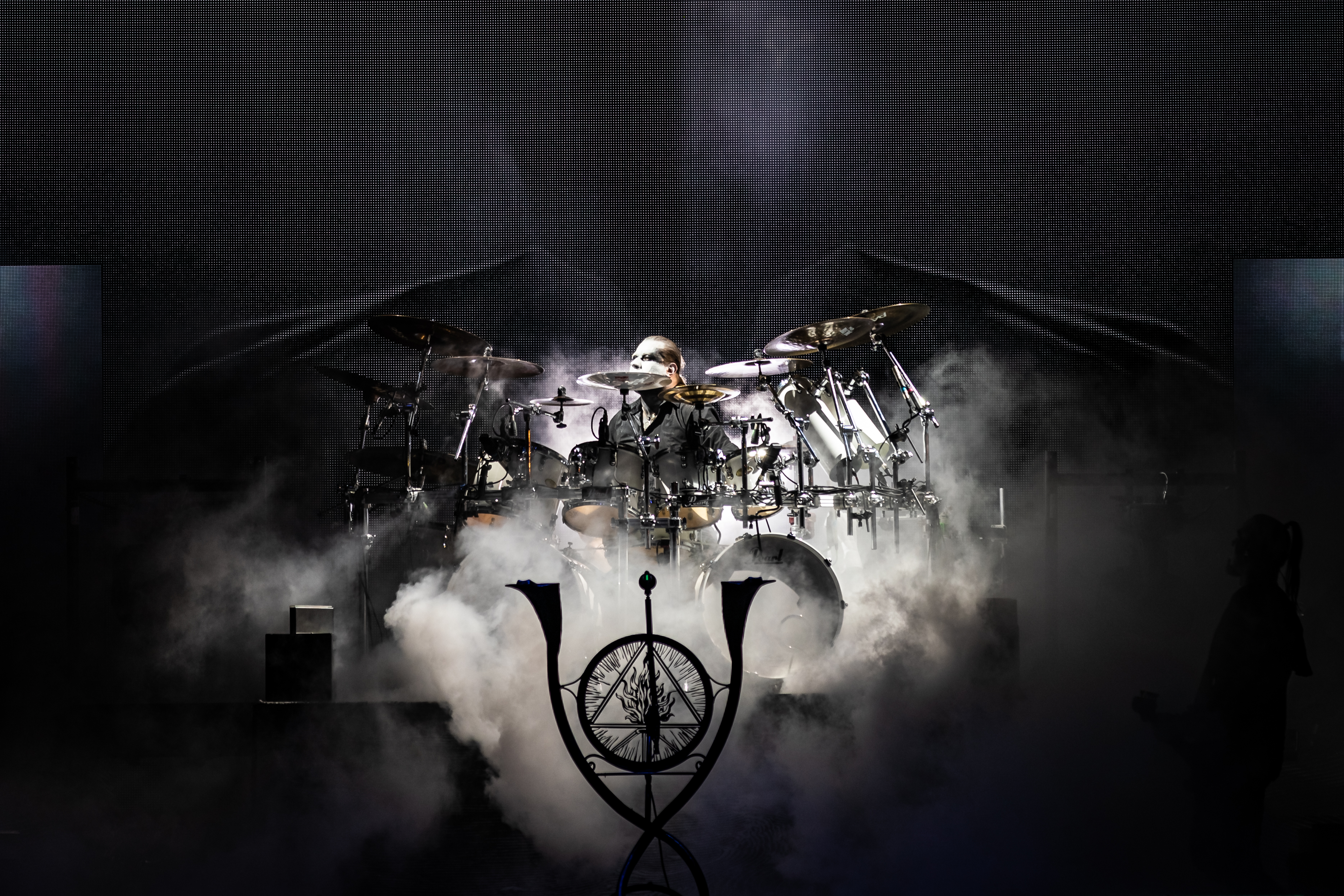
Inferno in 2019

In 2016, the band announced that they would start working on the follow-up to The Satanist. In early 2017, Nergal started posting clips of riffs on Instagram. He revealed that the band would release a new "live DVD", recorded in Warsaw, later that year. In a May 2017 interview, Nergal said that the band had "ten or thirteen, already, sketches of new songs" for the new album, with an estimated release date in the fall of 2018. The band entered the studio in November 2017 to record their eleventh studio album.

In January 2018, Behemoth was announced as a supporting act for Slayer's final world tour. On 13 April, the live DVD Messe Noire was released as a conclusion to The Satanist touring cycle. A new single titled "God = Dog" was released on 2 August from the eleventh album, I Loved You at Your Darkest, released on 5 October. The band embarked on a North American Tour on 20 October to support the album.

In August 2019, the band was announced as the support act for Slipknot's 2020 European tour.

In March 2021, Nergal announced that the band was preparing a new album to celebrate their 30th anniversary. The twelfth studio album, Opvs Contra Natvram, was announced on 11 May 2022, set to be released on 16 September. A music video for the first single, "Ov My Herculean Exile", was available for streaming that day.

In December 2023, Nergal reported that new music from Behemoth was in the works. On 29 January 2025, the band released "The Shit ov God" as the lead single and title track to their then-upcoming thirteenth studio album, The Shit Ov God, released on 9 May.

Behemoth announced a spring 2026 tour with support from Deicide, Immolation and Rotting Christ. This tour included an appearance at the Sonic Temple music festival in Columbus, Ohio on May 14. The band were confirmed to appear at Welcome to Rockville in Daytona Beach, Florida, scheduled for the same month.

== Musical style and lyrics ==
Lyrically, Behemoth has been described as "about as philosophical as it gets." Until the late 1990s, the band played a traditional black metal style with secular lyrical content, but changed to that of occult, Nordic paganism and thelemic themes written by their lead vocalist Nergal and Krzysztof Azarewicz. With the 1999 release of Satanica, the band demonstrated their presence in the death metal scene, while retaining their own signature style characterized by the drum work of Inferno and multi-layered vocals. Despite Behemoth having been labeled as death metal or thrash metal-influenced, Nergal has mentioned that he does not like the band to be labeled as such. Later themes explored by the band include anti-Christianity and Satanism. Phoenix New Times, who named Behemoth one of the "most Satanic metal bands of all time", assessed that the band "merges the mysticism and image of black metal with the force, precision and brutality of death metal."

The band has been known to perform with corpse paint while "flanked by cast-iron eagles and snake-wrapped mic stands," according to Invisible Oranges.

== Controversy and legal issues ==
In July 2007, the All-Polish Committee for Defense Against Sects distributed to many Polish officials a list of bands that allegedly promote Satanism and murder. Critics of this policy primarily see this as a violation of free speech. The list has not gone into effect, and Behemoth were allowed to play in Poland freely. In October 2014 this changed when Behemoth was banned from performing in Poznań.

Nergal has repeatedly been on trial in Poland for tearing up the Bible in a 2007 incident.

In May 2014, Russia expelled Behemoth for four to five years because of visa issues.

== Band members ==
=== Current ===
- Adam "Nergal" Darski – lead guitar, lead vocals (1991–present), bass (1991–1993, 1993–1997, 1998–2003), rhythm guitar (1992–1993, 1994–1995, 1997–1998, 1999–2000, 2003–2004)
- Zbigniew "Inferno" Promiński – drums (1997–1999, 2000–present)
- Tomasz "Orion" Wróblewski – bass, backing vocals (2003–present)
- Patryk "Seth" Sztyber – rhythm guitar, backing vocals (2004–present)

=== Former ===
- Adam "Baal Ravenlock" Muraszko – drums (1991–1996)
- Adam "Desecrator" Malinowski – rhythm guitar, backing vocals (1991–1992)
- Rafał "Frost" Brauer – rhythm guitar, backing vocals (1993–1994)
- Sławomir "Orcus" Kolasa – bass, backing vocals (1993)
- Leszek "Les" Dziegielewski – bass, rhythm guitar backing vocals (1995–1997, 1998–1999)
- Mefisto – bass, backing vocals (1997–1998)
- Mateusz "Havoc" Śmierzchalski – rhythm guitar, backing vocals (2000–2003)

=== Former session/touring musicians ===
- Marcin "Novy" Nowak – bass, backing vocals (2000–2003)

=== Touring musicians ===
- Bartłomiej "Bruno" Waruszewski – bass, backing vocals (1999)
- Istvan Lendvay – bass, backing vocals (2003)
- Michał "Stoker" Stopa – rhythm guitar, backing vocals (2004)
- Adam Sierżęga – drums (2013, 2016)
- Kerim "Krimh" Lechner – drums (2013)
- Jon "The Charn" Rice – drums (2017, 2019, 2022, 2024)
- Jay "The Tan God" Kumar – drums (2018)

== Discography ==
=== Studio albums ===
Year	Title
1995	Sventevith (Storming Near the Baltic)
1996	Grom
1998	Pandemonic Incantations
1999	Satanica
2000	Thelema.6
2002	Zos Kia Cultus (Here and Beyond)
2004	Demigod
2007	The Apostasy
2009	Evangelion
2014	The Satanist
2018	I Loved You at Your Darkest
2022	Opvs Contra Natvram
2025	The Shit Ov God
2026	I, Scvlptor

== Awards and nominations ==
Fryderyk Awards
Year	Category	Nominated work	Result	Ref(s)
2004	Rock/Heavy Metal Album of the Year (Album roku – rock/metal)	Demigod	Nominated	
2008	Rock/Heavy Metal Album of the Year (Album roku – rock/metal)	The Apostasy	Nominated	
2009	Heavy Metal Album of the Year (Album roku – heavy metal)	At The Arena ov Aion - Live Apostasy	Nominated	
2010	Best Cover Art (Wydawnictwo Specjalne Najlepsza Oprawa Graficzna)	Evangelion	Nominated	
2010	Heavy Metal Album of the Year (Album Roku Heavy Metal)	Evangelion	Won	
2010	Production of the Year (Produkcja Muzyczna Roku)	Evangelion	Nominated	
2010	Band of the Year (Grupa Roku)	Behemoth	Nominated	
2010	Videoclip of the Year (Wideoklip Roku)	"Ov Fire And The Void"	Nominated	
2011	Videoclip of the Year (Wideoklip Roku)	"Alas, Lord Is Upon Me"	Nominated	
2012	Videoclip of the Year (Wideoklip Roku)	"Lucifer"	Nominated	
2014	Album of the Year (Metal Hammer Golden Gods Awards)	The Satanist	Won	

Berlin Music Video Awards
Year	Category	Nominated work	Result
2023	Best Bizarre	Versvs Christvs	Nominated
