= Ursynalia =

Music festival in Warsaw, Poland

Ursynalia – Warsaw Student Festival
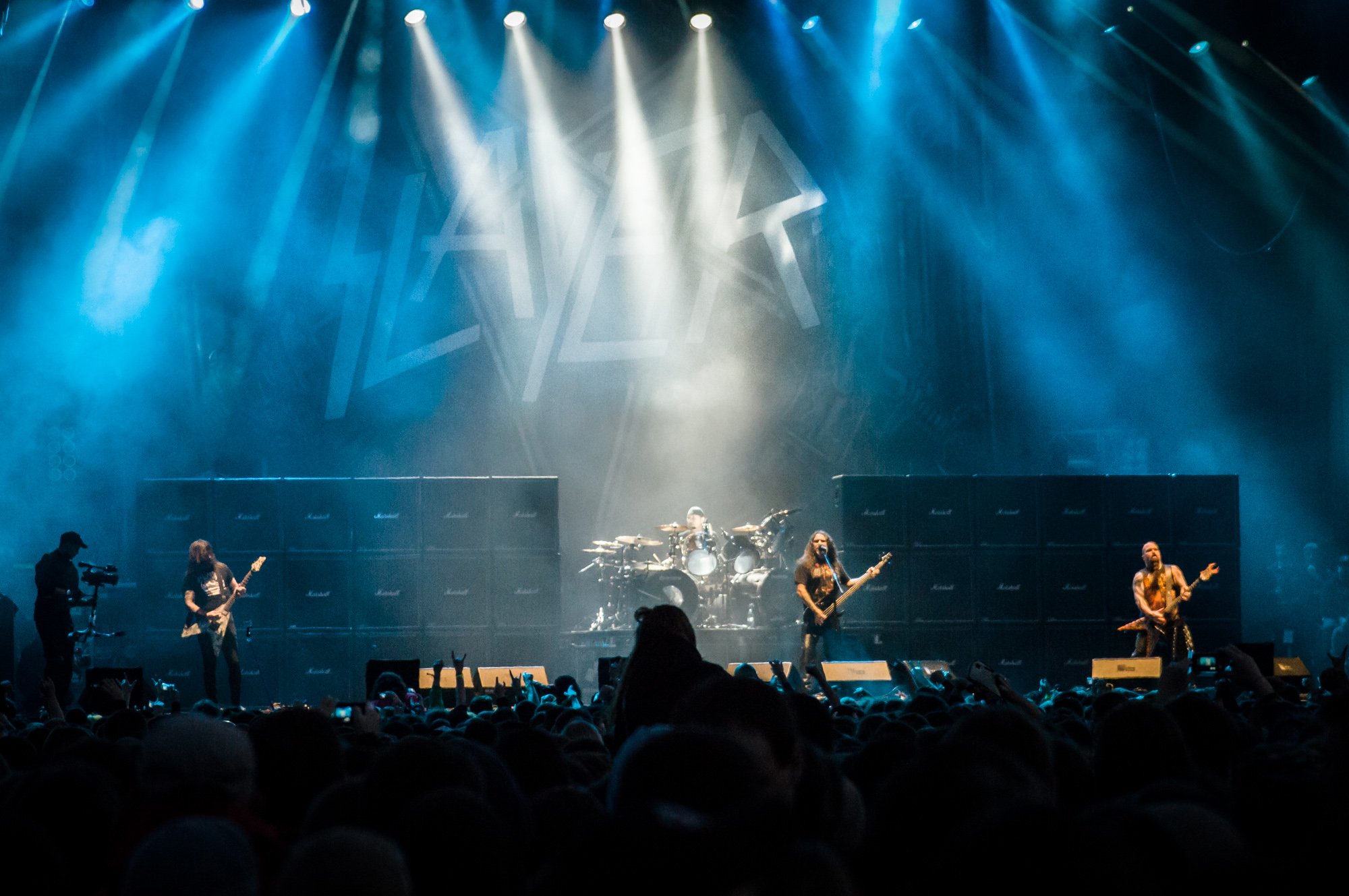
- Slayer concert at Ursynalia 2012
- Genre: Rock, heavy metal, pop, electronic, hip hop, reggae
- Dates: May/June (3 days)
- Locations: SGGW Main Campus, Warsaw
- Years active: 1983–present
- Founders: SGGW Students' Union
- Website: ursynalia.pl

Ursynalia – Warsaw Student Festival (until 2009 Ursynalia) is a Polish music festival held each year in Warsaw at the end of May or beginning of June. It is organized by students' union of Warsaw University of Life Sciences (SGGW) and, since 2009, by Fundacja Bonum and Arena Live Production. The first edition of the festival was held in 1983.

The festival takes place in the Main Campus of SGGW.

== Artists ==
=== 2013 ===
Warsaw, SGGW Main Campus

Friday 31 May:
Main Stage: Frog'n'Dog, Dead by April, Soilwork, Hunter, The Sixpounder, Motörhead, Bullet for My Valentine
Open Stage: Transsexdisco, Lostbone, Frontside, Poparzeni Kawą Trzy, Luxtorpeda, Enej, Pendulum

Saturday 1 June:
Main Stage: Seven on Seven, Hedfirst, Parkway Drive, Chemia, Venflon, HIM, 3 Doors Down
Open Stage: Icona, Minerals, Corruption, Mesajah, Jelonek, Gentleman & The Evolution, DJ Procop

Sunday 2 June:
Main Stage: Magnificent Muttley, Infernal Bizarre, Mama Selita, Royal Republic, Ukeje, TSA
Open Stage: Splot, Audioshock, Katy Carr and the Aviators, Friction

=== 2012 ===
Warsaw, SGGW Main Campus

1 June:
Main Stage: Limp Bizkit, Slayer, Luxtorpeda, Lipali, AmetriA, Noko, Sandaless, Chassis
Open Stage: Tabasko, Fisz Emade, The Pryzmats, DJ Procop, Benassi Bros. feat. Dhany, Paul Johns

2 June:
Main Stage: Nightwish, In Flames, My Riot, Oedipus, Illusion, Hunter, Orbita Wiru At the Lake
Open Stage: Modestep, Poparzeni Kawą Trzy, Warszafski Deszcz

3 June:
Main Stage: Billy Talent, Mastodon, Gojira, Jelonek, Armia, Believe, Holden Avenue
Open Stage: George Borowski, Awolnation, Dzień Zapłaty

=== 2011 ===
Warsaw, SGGW Main Campus

1 June:
Main Stage: Korn, StillWell, Jelonek, Proletaryat, Carrion
Club Tent: Grubson, Numer Raz, Dj Abdool

2 June:
Main Stage: Guano Apes, Alter Bridge, Perfect, Olaf Deriglasoff, Sen Zu
Club Tent: Martijn Ten Velden

3 June:
Main Stage: Simple Plan, Turboweekend, Oedipus, Young Guns, Jamal, Afromental
Club Tent: Mafia Mike

=== 2010 ===
Warsaw, SGGW Main Campus

28 May
Main Stage: Parov Stelar, Strachy na Lachy, Jelonek
Club Tent: Angelo Mike]

29 May:
Main Stage: Lipali, Buldog, The Futureheads, Coma, Kazik na Żywo
Club Tent: Duże Pe

30 May:
Main Stage: Sidney Polak, Ewa Farna, Lady Pank
Club Tent: Tuniziano

=== 2009 ===
Warsaw, SGGW Main Campus

29 May:
Main Stage: Hurt, Coma, Hunter, Dick4Dick, Gandahar, Zee, Enej, Sandaless
Little Stage: Venflon, Inscript, Maypole, IMBRIS, Hand Resist, Cowder, Dig the Hole, Ner-w

30 May:
Main Stage: Kosheen, Izrael, AudioFeels, Lao Che, Koniec Świata, Dubska, Skangur, DoriFi
Little Stage: Sensithief, D.E.M., S.H.E, Kolorofon, Monkey Flip, Dziurawej Pół Czekolady, Avogardo

31 May:
Main Stage: Village Kollektiv, Jelonek, At The Lake, Żywiołak, Dikanda, Czeremszyna, Folkoperacja, Strefa Mocnych Wiatrów

=== 2008 ===
9 May:
Vanilla Sky, Hunter, Farben Lehre, Zee, Orkiestra Dni Naszych, Stan Miłości I Zaufania, SL stereo, dżewo, Sen Zu, At the Lake

10 May:
Big Cyc, Hey, H-Blockx, Hurt, PlatEAU, Enej, no smoki, Michał Jelonek, Good Day, Weed, Night Rider

=== 2007 ===
11 May:
Wilki, Oddział Zamknięty, Acid Drinkers, Wrinkled Fred, Mierwa

12 May:
Dżem, T. Love, Lao Che, Power of Trinity, Bramafan

=== 2006 ===
12 May:
IRA, Coma, Hunter, Ametria, Minerwa, Archeon, Liquid Sanity

13 May:
Dżem, Lady Pank, Happysad, Indios Bravos, Power of Trinity, Mama Selita

=== 2005 ===
12–13 May:
Tede, O.S.T.R., Afro Kolektyw, Łona, The Elements, Tworzywo Sztuczne, Püdelsi, Transglobal Underground, Papa Dance
