= Lostbone =

Polish death metal band

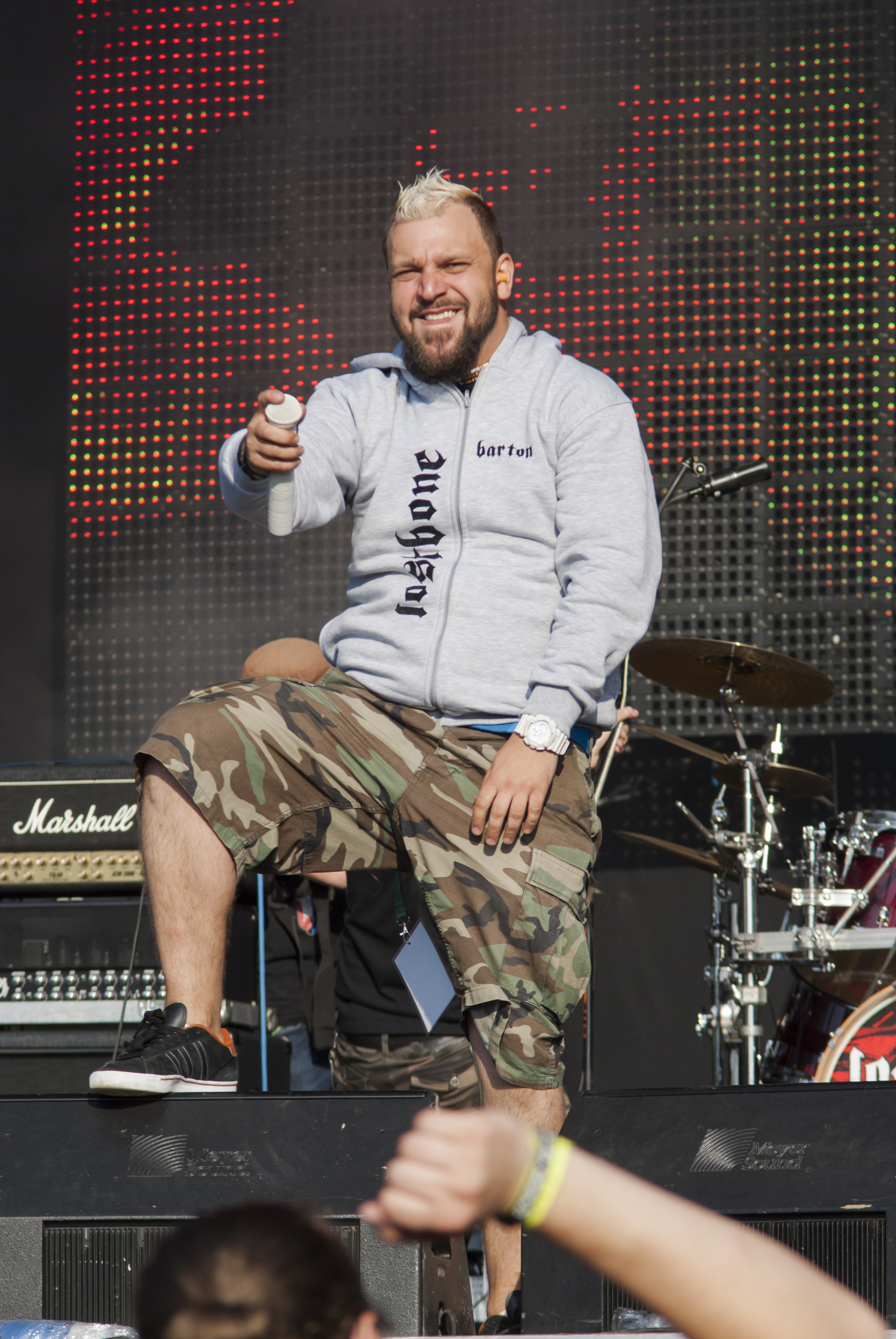
- Bartosz "Barton" Szarek during Ursynalia - Warsaw Student Festival

Background information
- Origin: Warsaw, Poland
- Genres: heavy metal; death metal; hardcore; thrash metal
- Years active: 2005–2015
- Labels: Metal Mundus, Altart Music, Spook Records, Defend Music, IODA, Fonografika
- Members: Przemysław Łucyan; Michał Kowalczyk
- Past members: Bartosz Szarek; Krzysztof Bałauszko; Biały; Piotr Surmacz; Adrian Manowski; Maciek Krzemiński
- Website: http://www.lostbone.pl/

Lostbone is a Polish death metal group formed in 2005.

== History ==
=== Time To Rise (2005–2007) ===
Lostbone was formed by Przemek Łucyan in October 2005. Drummer Krzysiek Bałauszko joined in January 2006, followed by vocalist Piotrek Surmacz in September 2006, and bassist Adrian Manowski in January 2007. The four-piece recorded their first EP, Time to Rise in Progresja Studio in Warsaw on 10-11 February 2007, with Paweł Grabowski. The graphic design of the EP was created by Jakub Sokólski. The band performed live for the first time in CPK in Warsaw.

=== Lostbone (2007–2008) ===
In July 2007 Manowski was replaced on bass by Maciek Krzemiński, former member of Harmider. One month later, Lostbone recorded their first album with 10 tracks in Progresja Studio. On 10 October 2007, Lostbone performed at ParkFest in Warsaw, where they met drummer Janek Englisz, who replaced Krzysiek Bałauszko one month later. Two tracks from the Time to Rise EP were released on the DIY: Hardcore Attack 2007 compilation in November. The Depozyt 44 club in Warsaw hosted the launch of the first album, Lostbone, on 20 January 2008. Distribution in Poland was managed by Spook Records. The album earned a number of good reviews, tracks began to be played late at night in several radio stations which was soon followed by numerous concerts. "Sick Of It" was released by the French United Winds music label in April 2008 as part of the Moshing Attitude part 1 compilation. Maciek Krzemiński left the band in June 2008.

=== Split It Out (2008–2009) ===
In July 2008 bassist Michał Kowalczyk joined Lostbone, and one month later the vocalist was replaced by Bartosz ‘Barton’ Szarek, forming the band's longest-lasting line-up. The band recorded three tracks in Progresja Studio in September 2008, incorporated one month later into a Split It Out, a split EP with Terrordome. Lostbone performed for the first time in the new lineup on 12 October in Warsaw's Club Punkt. In December, the Lostbone album had its worldwide premiere in the digital form thanks to the US publisher Defend Music. At the same time, Poland witnessed the release of ‘Blood Hardcore’ compilation incorporating two tracks from the ‘Split It Out’. The end of 2008 and the first half of 2009 were marked by numerous concerts played among others alongside L'Esprit du Clan, Beatallica, Frontside, Proletaryat, or Corruption. Premiere of the first music clip ‘Vultures’ took place in June 2009.

=== Severance (2009–2011) ===
In the Summer 2009 in Progresja Studio, Lostbone together with Janos recorded twelve tracks for the second album – ‘Severance’. Szymon Czech from the Olsztyn X Studio and Elephant Studio was responsible for mixing and mastering. Once again, Kacper Rachtan prepared the graphic design of the album. Album with the characteristic hangman's knot on the cover had its premiere on 13 February 2010 by AltArt Music, and one day later, Lostbone performed the premiere concert in Warsaw Neo club alongside So I Scream. In March the group embarked on its first, full-scale tour alongside Corruption and Carnal as ‘Bourbon River Re-Creation Tour 2010’. The album received positive feedback from both the press and the audience, and the band continued with the concerts through the year, including the second part of tour with Corruption. ‘Severance’ was released in the digital form worldwide in June by Quickstar Production. Year 2011 started for Lostbone with playing as a support for KAT & Roman Kostrzewski in the Warsaw Stodoła club. The first video promoting ‘Severance’ for the title track premiered in April. Following months brought considerable number of concerts, among others a tour with Frontside, which resulted in winning the second place at the polish finale of Wacken Metal Battle 2011. Other important performances included becoming the only support of Cavalera conspiracy in Stodoła club or playing as one of the leading bands during the Metalowa Twierdza 2011 Festival. In July 2011 Lostbone entered the Sound Division Studio in Warsaw to record the third album. Arek ‘Malta’ Malczewski and Filip ‘Heinrich’ Hałucha were responsible for the recording. The end of the year was marked by even more concerts player either as a headliner or alongside Frontside and Hunter.

=== Ominous (2012–2013) ===
The album Ominous was released on 13 January 2012, followed by three premiere concerts in Wrocław, Bielsko-Biała and Warsaw. The album met with a positive response and gathered good reviews. In March, Lostbone embarked on the month-long Metal Tour of 2012 across Poland, together with Made Of Hate and Hedfirst. In the summer months, Lostbone headlined ŻubrFest 2012, Festiwal Mocnych Brzmień alongside Decapitated and supported Six Feet Under in Warsaw.

In the second half of the year, Lostbone played the ‘Ominogen Live 2012’ mini-tour with Made Of Hate and concerts alongside Frontside, My Riot and Flapjack. The year has ended for the Lostbone with the performance at Warszawa Brzmi Ciężko festiwal alongside Hate and Hellectricity. In February 2013, Lostbone performed at Black Star Fest IV – festival in the memory of Aleksander „Olass" Mendyk. At the same month, the band signed in the agreement with Fonografika, which was to release ‘Ominous’ worldwide in a digital form. In March and April 2013, Lostbone embarked on a 15-date tour of Poland alongside Made of Hate and various guests, including Empatic. In April, the band released Ominous on YouTube for free. On 31 May, Lostbone performed at the Ursynalia 2013 Festival. In June, Lostbone supported Coal Chamber in Mega Club in Katowice, and on 5 July Gojira in Stodoła club in Warsaw and during Metal Day in Nysa, followed by a series of autumn concerts alongside Acid Drinkers, Hunter and Frontside.

=== Not Your Kind (2014–) ===
Recording session of the fourth album started on 2 January 2014 in the ZED Studio, with some tracks recorded in the HZ Studio, Selecta Studio and HUGE Studio. In the beginning of April, Lostbone performed a short tour in Latvia. On 10 June, the band presented the cover of the new album, Not Your Kind, designed by Łukasz Pach. The album was released worldwide by the Fonografika, and featured guest appearances by Mike Kostrzyński of Made of Hate, Dariusz Kupis of Frontside, Łukasz Pach, Tomasz Pukacki of Acid Drinkers, and vocalist Tomasz Lipnicki of Illusion and Lipali. The album featured the band's first Polish-language track, "Monolit". Lostbone appeared in September at the Summer Dying Loud Festival in Aleksandrów. In October, the band went on a foreign tour including Romania, Czech Republic and Hungary, supported by Loko. November 2014 brought another tour across Poland, this time in the company of Scarlet Skies. Lostbone finished 2014 by supporting Pro-Pain in Zory.

In April 2015 Lostbone visited Romania again, and in May arrived in Latvia together with Enhet. In July, the band appeared at the Rock Night 2015 festival alongside Dezerter and Virgin Snatch, and performed at two festivals in Romania and the Czech Republic: Barock Fest and Barrocko Fest 2015. In August Lostbone played at Muszla Fest in Bydgoszcz.

=== Metal United (2015–…) ===
In October 2015 Lostbone played the headliner tour across Romania. To celebrate the tenth anniversary, in October the band released a CD compilation ‘Metal United 2015’ with three new songs and other tracks submitted by four metal bands from Romania: Implant Pentru Refuz, Marchosias, Target and Decease. New songs were recorded in August in ex-Progresja Studio – renamed the JNS Studio – once again under the guidance of Paweł ‘Janos’ Grabowski. The end of 2015 year brought yet another shows across Poland.

== Members ==
Current members

- Przemysław Łucyan – guitar (2005–2015)
- Michał Kowalczyk – bass guitar (2008–2015)
- Jan Englisz – drums (2007–2015)

Former members

- Bartosz "Barton" Szarek – vocals (2008–2015)
- Krzysztof Bałauszko – drums (2006–2007)
- "Biały" – second guitar (2006)
- Piotr Surmacz – vocals (2006–2008)
- Adrian Manowski – bass guitar (2007)
- Maciek Krzemiński – bass guitar (2007–2008)

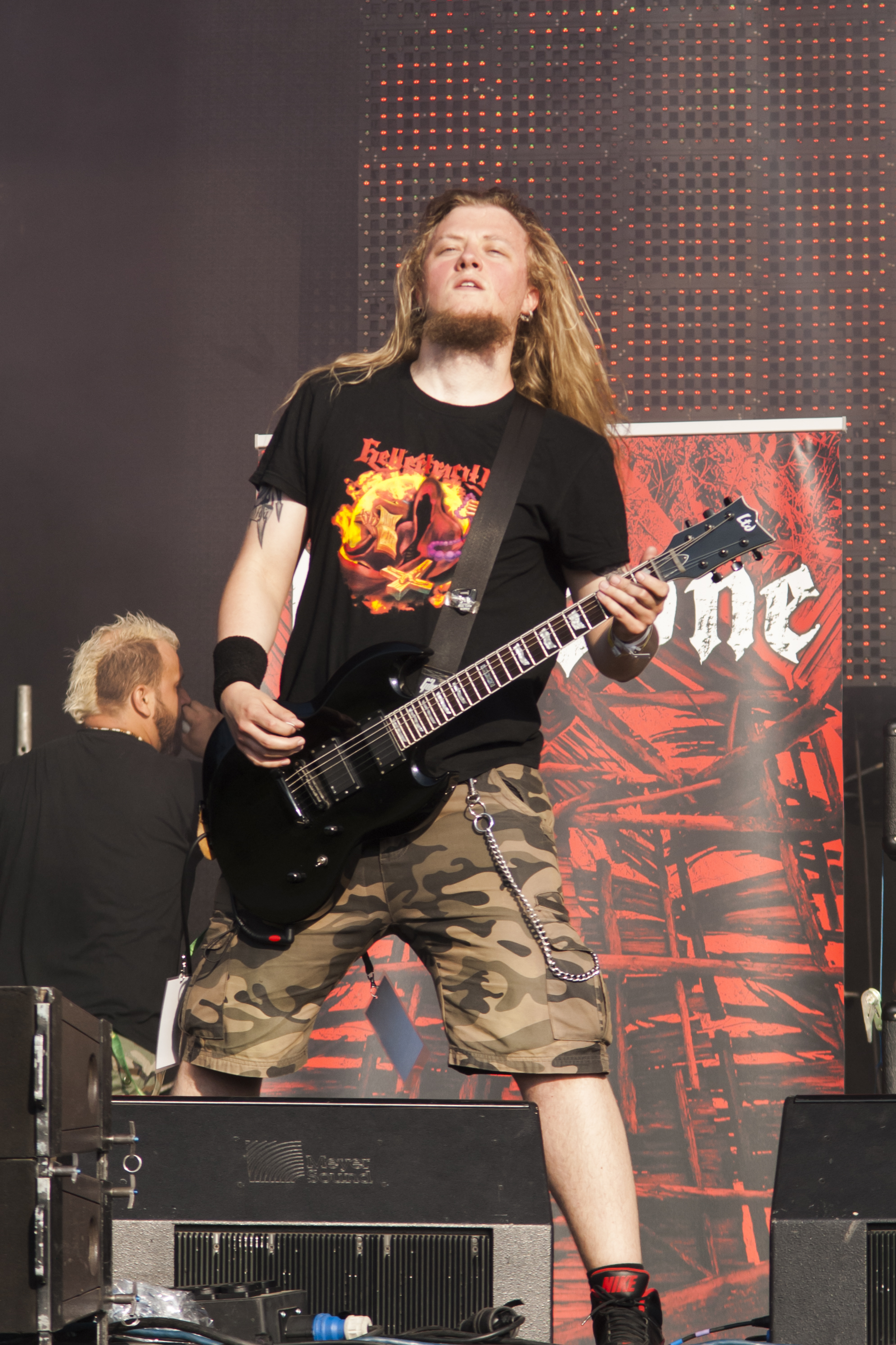
Przemysław Łucyan during Ursynalia - Warsaw Student Festival

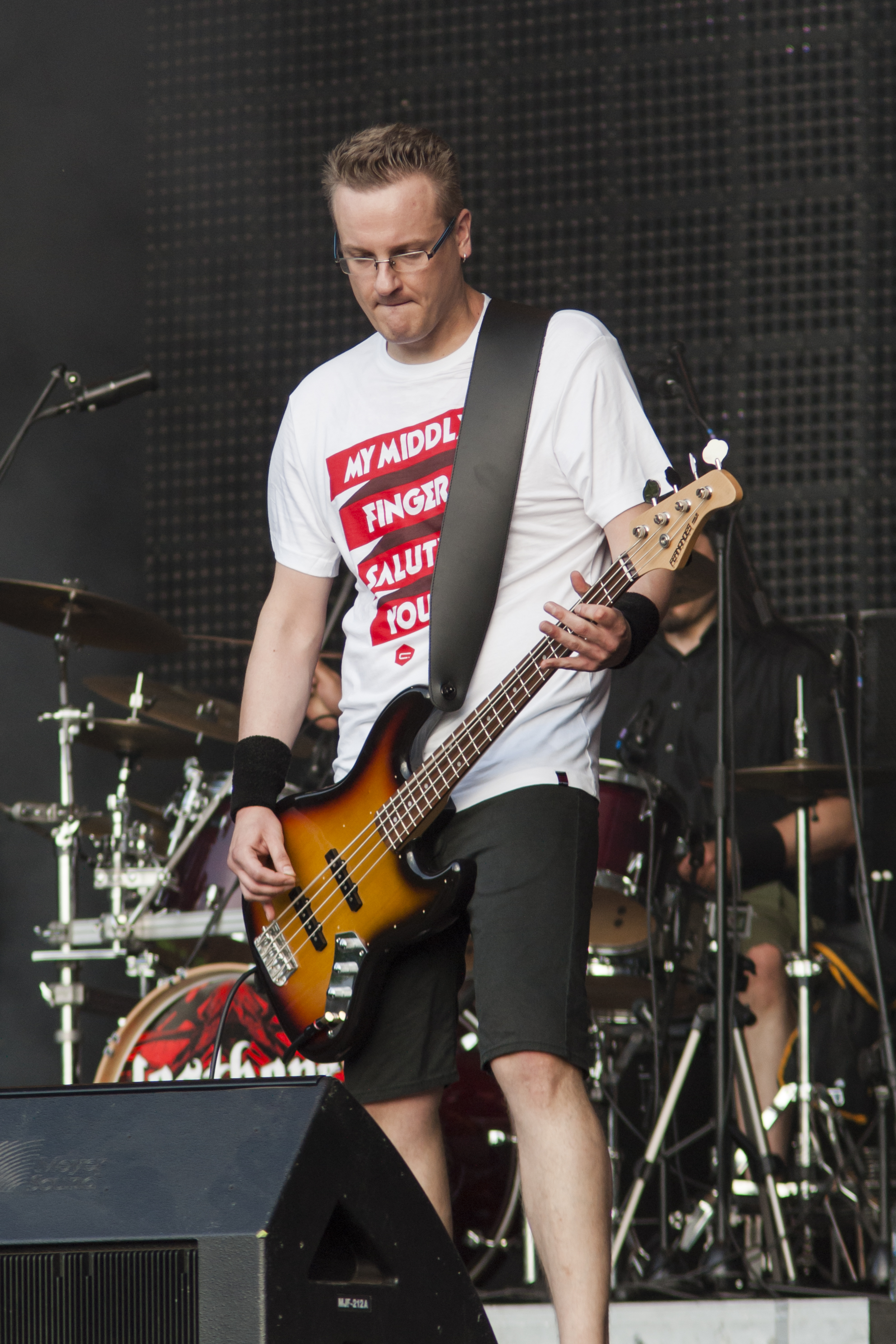
Michał Kowalczyk during Ursynalia - Warsaw Student Festival

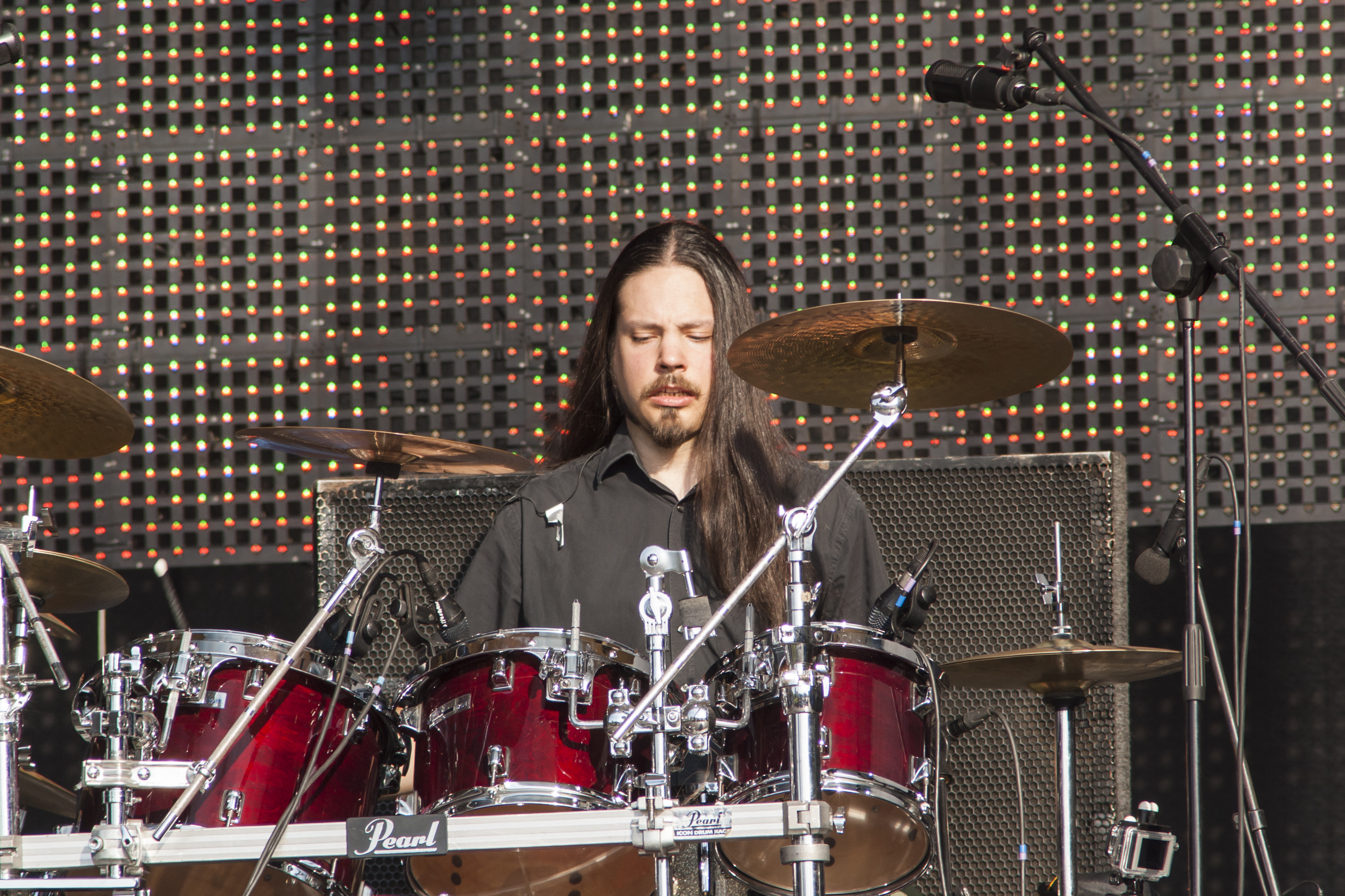
Jan Engliszduring Ursynalia - Warsaw Student Festival

== Discography ==
- Time to rise (2007, EP)
- Split it out (with z Terrordome, 2008)
- Lostbone (2008)
- Severance (2010)
- Ominous (2012)
- Not Your Kind (2014)
- Metal United (2015, compilation, CD)

Charts

Title	Year	Position	Album
Title	Year	Turbo Top	Album
"Nothing Left"	2014	1	Not Your Kind
"—" denotes a recording that did not chart.

== Video clips ==
- „Choose Or Be Chosen" – 2013 (Tomek Niedzielko and Magogo Production)
- „Temptations" – 2012 (Mikołaj Birek)
- „An Eye for an Eye" – 2012 (Tomek Niedzielko and Magogo Production)
- „Severance" – 2011 (Piotr Karcz and Karczoid)
- „Vultures" – 2009 (Misiek Ślusarski)
- „Nothing Left" – 2014 (Dominik L. Marzec, Michał Barylski)
- „Into the pit" – 2015 (Tomek Niedzielko, dancers: Marta Ranosz i Dela Potera)
