= HellWood =

Studio album by Hunter
- Released: 14 April 2009
- Recorded: January–February 2009, Sonus Studio, Nemezis, Studio X
- Genre: Thrash metal, heavy metal
- Length: 56:14
- Language: Polish
- Label: Mystic Production
- Producer: Andrzej Karp, Paweł Grzegorczyk

Hunter chronology
T.E.L.I... (2005)	HellWood (2009)	Królestwo (2012)

Professional ratings
Review scores
Source	Rating
Teraz Rock	4/5 stars

HellWood is the fourth studio album by Polish heavy metal band Hunter. It was released on 14 April 2009 by Mystic Production.

A music videos have been made for the songs "Labirynt Fauna" and "Strasznik" directed by Dariusz Szermanowicz and Mateusz Winkiel, respectively.

The album landed at number 9 on Polish Albums Chart, and dropped out five weeks later.

== Track listing ==
No.	Title	Lyrics	Music	Length
1.	"Nadchodzi..."	Paweł Grzegorczyk	Paweł Grzegorczyk	0:18
2.	"Strasznik"	Paweł Grzegorczyk	Paweł Grzegorczyk	3:45
3.	"$mierci$miech"	Paweł Grzegorczyk	Paweł Grzegorczyk	5:09
4.	"Labirynt Fauna"	Paweł Grzegorczyk	Paweł Grzegorczyk	7:26
5.	"Duch epoki"	Paweł Grzegorczyk	Paweł Grzegorczyk, Konrad Karchut	5:15
6.	"Armia Boga"	Paweł Grzegorczyk	Paweł Grzegorczyk	7:00
7.	"Dura Lex Sed Lex"	Michał Jelonek	Michał Jelonek	2:46
8.	"TshaZshyC"	Paweł Grzegorczyk	Paweł Grzegorczyk, Piotr Kędzierzawski, Grzegorz Sławiński	5:02
9.	"Arges"	Paweł Grzegorczyk	Paweł Grzegorczyk, Konrad Karchut	10:18
10.	"Cztery wieki później..."	Paweł Grzegorczyk	Paweł Grzegorczyk	3:54
11.	"Zbawienie"	Paweł Grzegorczyk	Paweł Grzegorczyk	5:21
Total length:				56:14

== Credits ==
Hunter

- Paweł "Drak" Grzegorczyk – vocals, guitars, piano, sound engineering, editing, producing
- Dariusz "Daray" Brzozowski – drums
- Piotr "Pit" Kędzierzawski – guitars, sound engineering
- Konrad "Saimon" Karchut – bass
- Michał "Jelonek" Jelonek – violin, viola, sound engineering

Production

- Andrzej "AKA" Karp – producing, sound engineering, editing
- Jacek Miłaszewski – mixing, mastering
- Marcin Kiełbaszewski – sound engineering, editing
- Marian Lech – sound engineering
- Irena Tanasescu – transcriptions
- Maciej Boryna – photography
- Mentalporn (Katarzyna Zaremba, Piotr "Qras" Kurek) – cover art and layout
- Kazuo Shiwashi, Marian Lech, Dawid Marków – editing
