= Jelonek =

Jelonek may refer to:

== Places ==
- Jelonek, Gniezno County in Greater Poland Voivodeship (west-central Poland)
- Jelonek, Lipsko County in Masovian Voivodeship (east-central Poland)
- Jelonek, Przysucha County in Masovian Voivodeship (east-central Poland)
- Jelonek, Krotoszyn County in Greater Poland Voivodeship (west-central Poland)
- Jelonek, Warmian-Masurian Voivodeship (north Poland)
- Jelonek, West Pomeranian Voivodeship (north-west Poland)

== Other uses ==
- Michał Jelonek, Polish violinist
  - Jelonek (album), first solo album of the violinist
