= Królestwo =

Studio album by Hunter
- Released: 5 November 2012
- Genre: Thrash metal, heavy metal
- Length: 38:36
- Language: Polish
- Label: Tune Project/Mystic Production
- Producer: Paweł "Drak" Grzegorczyk, Andrzej "Aka" Karp

Hunter chronology
HellWood (2009)	Królestwo (2012)	Imperium (2013)

Professional ratings
Review scores
Source	Rating
Teraz Rock	4/5 stars

Królestwo is the fifth studio album by Polish heavy metal band Hunter. It was released on 5 November 2012 by Tune Project/Mystic Production.

A music videos have been made for the songs "Trumian Show", "PSI", both directed by Mateusz Winkiel and "O wolności" which consists live footage.

The album landed at number 4 on Polish Albums Chart, and dropped out two weeks later. On 4 July 2013 Królestwo was certified Gold in Poland for selling 15,000 copies.

== Track listing ==
No.	Title	Lyrics	Music	Length
1.	"Intro" (instrumental)		Paweł Grzegorczyk	00:57
2.	"Rzeźnia nr 6"	Paweł Grzegorczyk	Paweł Grzegorczyk	04:54
3.	"Dwie siekiery"	Paweł Grzegorczyk	Paweł Grzegorczyk	04:30
4.	"Trumian Show"	Paweł Grzegorczyk	Paweł Grzegorczyk	04:01
5.	"Sztandar"	Michał Jelonek	Michał Jelonek	02:53
6.	"Samael"	Paweł Grzegorczyk	Paweł Grzegorczyk, Konrad Karchut	03:35
7.	"Inni"	Paweł Grzegorczyk	Paweł Grzegorczyk	04:27
8.	"Kostian"	Paweł Grzegorczyk	Paweł Grzegorczyk, Piotr Kędzierzawski	03:46
9.	"PSI"	Paweł Grzegorczyk	Paweł Grzegorczyk, Piotr Kędzierzawski	03:17
10.	"RnЯ"	Paweł Grzegorczyk	Paweł Grzegorczyk, Piotr Kędzierzawski	02:43
11.	"O wolności"	Paweł Grzegorczyk	Paweł Grzegorczyk	03:33
Total length:				38:36

== Credits ==
Hunter

- Paweł "Drak" Grzegorczyk - lead vocals, backing vocals, guitars, producing, cover art
- Piotr "Pit" Kędzierzawski - guitars, backing vocals, cover art
- Michał "Jelonek" Jelonek - violin, backing vocals
- Konrad "Simon" Karchut - bass guitar
- Dariusz "Daray" Brzozowski - drums
- Arkadiusz "Letki" Letkiewicz - percussion, drums (11)

Production

- Andrzej "Aka" Karp - producing
- Jacek Miłaszewski - mixing, mastering
