= T.E.L.I... =

Studio album by Hunter
- Released: 30 May 2005
- Recorded: March–April 2005, Sonus Studio
- Genre: Thrash metal, heavy metal
- Length: 53:10
- Language: Polish, English
- Label: Mystic Production
- Producer: Andrzej Karp

Hunter chronology
Medeis (2003)	T.E.L.I... (2005)	HellWood (2009)

Professional ratings
Review scores
Source	Rating
Teraz Rock	4/5 stars

T.E.L.I... is the third studio album by Polish heavy metal band Hunter. It was released on 30 May 2005 by Metal Mind Productions.

A music videos have been made for the songs "Pomiędzy niebem, a piekłem" and "T.E.L.I." directed by Marcin Klinger and Tomasz Mączka, respectively.

The album landed at number 7 on Polish Albums Chart, and dropped out four weeks later.

== Track listing ==
No.	Title	Lyrics	Music	Length
1.	"Intro" (instrumental)		Paweł Grzegorczyk	0:10
2.	"T.E.L.I..."	Paweł Grzegorczyk	Paweł Grzegorczyk, Michał Jelonek	4:35
3.	"Wersety"	Paweł Grzegorczyk	Paweł Grzegorczyk, Michał Jelonek, Andrzej Karp	4:44
4.	"BiałoCzerw"	Paweł Grzegorczyk	Paweł Grzegorczyk	6:00
5.	"NieRaj"	Paweł Grzegorczyk	Paweł Grzegorczyk	4:14
6.	"Krzyk kamieni"	Paweł Grzegorczyk	Paweł Grzegorczyk	7:00
7.	"Wyznawcy"	Paweł Grzegorczyk	Paweł Grzegorczyk	2:30
8.	"$$$$$$$$..."	Paweł Grzegorczyk	Paweł Grzegorczyk	5:03
9.	"Płytki dołek"	Paweł Grzegorczyk	Paweł Grzegorczyk, Michał Jelonek	3:53
10.	"Przy wódce..."	Paweł Grzegorczyk	Paweł Grzegorczyk, Piotr Kędzierzawski	3:45
11.	"Pomiędzy niebem a piekłem"	Paweł Grzegorczyk	Paweł Grzegorczyk, Andrzej Karp	3:20
12.	"Osiem"	Paweł Grzegorczyk	Paweł Grzegorczyk, Andrzej Karp	6:06
13.	"Outro" (instrumental)		Andrzej Karp	0:50
Total length:				52:10

English version
No.	Title	Length
1.	"Intro"	0:15
2.	"T.E.L.I..."	4:55
3.	"Shallow Hole"	3:40
4.	"Verses"	5:00
5.	"The Leader"	3:55
6.	"Screamin' Stones"	6:50
7.	"notHeaven"	4:05
8.	"Greedy Monster"	6:15
9.	"Believerse"	2:20
10.	"RedWhiteNess"	5:40
11.	"$$$$$$$$..."	5:00
12.	"Dummy"	3:10
13.	"Loneliness"	4:15
14.	"Between Heaven and Hell"	3:18
15.	"Outro"	2:00
Total length:		60:38

== Credits ==
Hunter

- Paweł "Drak" Grzegorczyk – vocals, guitars, production
- Grzegorz "Brooz" Sławiński – drums
- Piotr "Pit" Kędzierzawski – guitars
- Konrad "Saimon" Karchut – bass guitar
- Michał "Jelonek" Jelonek – violin, production

Additional musicians

- Jacek "Budyń" Szymkiewicz – keyboards

Production

- Andrzej "Aka" Karp – production, sound engineering, mixing
- Marcin "Narcel" Płoński – sound engineering, mixing
- Piotr "Lasko" Laskowski – sound engineering
- Julita Emanuiłow – mastering
