= Farben =

Farben (German: "color") may refer to:

- IG Farben - former German chemical industry conglomerate
  - IG Farben Building - former corporate headquarters of IG Farben in Frankfurt, Germany
  - IG Farben Trial - the war crimes trial of 24 IG Farben executives following World War II
- Alle Farben (born 1985), German DJ and record producer
- Jan Jelinek - German electronic musician, who has performed under the name "Farben"
- Farben Lehre - Polish punk rock band
- Third movement of Arnold Schoenberg's Five Pieces for Orchestra
