= Medeis =

Studio album by Hunter
- Released: 7 March 2003
- Recorded: August–November 2002, Studio Izabelin, Poland
- Genre: Thrash metal, heavy metal
- Length: 48:55
- Language: English, Polish
- Label: Rubicon/Pomaton EMI
- Producer: Paweł "Drak" Grzegorczyk, Andrzej "Aka" Karp, Michał Jelonek, Piotr Laskowski

Hunter chronology
Requiem (1995)	Medeis (2003)	T.E.L.I... (2005)

Professional ratings
Review scores
Source	Rating
Teraz Rock	3.5/5 stars

Medeis is the second studio album by Polish heavy metal band Hunter. It was released on 7 March 2003 by Rubicon/Pomaton EMI.

A music videos have been made for the songs "Kiedy umieram" and "Fallen" both directed by Marcin Klinger.

== Track listing ==
No.	Title	Lyrics	Music	Length
1.	"Fallen"	Paweł Grzegorczyk	Paweł Grzegorczyk, Piotr Kędzierzawski	6:10
2.	"Fantasmagoria"	Paweł Grzegorczyk	Paweł Grzegorczyk	4:50
3.	"So..."	Paweł Grzegorczyk	Paweł Grzegorczyk, Piotr Kędzierzawski	2:57
4.	"Greed"	Paweł Grzegorczyk	Paweł Grzegorczyk	5:03
5.	"Grabasz..."	Paweł Grzegorczyk	Paweł Grzegorczyk	4:40
6.	"Mirror of War"	Paweł Grzegorczyk	Paweł Grzegorczyk	2:24
7.	"Siedem (Medeis)"	Paweł Grzegorczyk	Paweł Grzegorczyk	6:00
8.	"Why?"	Paweł Grzegorczyk	Paweł Grzegorczyk	4:24
9.	"Nikt"	Paweł Grzegorczyk	Paweł Grzegorczyk	1:47
10.	"Loża szyderców"	Paweł Grzegorczyk	Paweł Grzegorczyk, Piotr Kędzierzawski	5:31
11.	"Kiedy umieram"	Paweł Grzegorczyk	Paweł Grzegorczyk	5:09
Total length:				48:55

== Credits ==
Hunter

- Paweł "Drak" Grzegorczyk - vocals, guitars
- Piotr "Pit" Kędzierzawski - guitars
- Konrad "Saimon" Karchut - bass guitar
- Grzesiek "Brooz" Sławiński - drums

Additional musicians

- Tomek "Fester" Golijaszewski - bass guitar
- Andrzej "Aka" Karp - bass guitar
- Michał Jelonek - violin
- Paweł "Żaba" Żełobowski - conga
- Marek Musik - conga

Production

- Andrzej "Aka" Karp - sound engineering, production, mixing, mastering
- Paweł "Drak" Grzegorczyk - production
- Michał Jelonek - production
- Piotr Laskowski - sound engineering, production, mixing
- Ryszard Szmit - sound engineering
- Grzegorz Piwkowski - mastering
- Irek Mazur - multimedia presentation
