= Imperium (Hunter album) =

Studio album by Hunter
- Released: 15 November 2013
- Recorded: June–August 2012, May–August 2013
- Genre: Thrash metal, heavy metal
- Length: 37:38
- Language: Polish
- Label: Tune Project/Fonografika
- Producer: Paweł "Drak" Grzegorczyk

Hunter chronology
Królestwo (2012)	Imperium (2013)

Professional ratings
Review scores
Source	Rating
Interia.pl	6/10 stars

Imperium is the sixth studio album by Polish heavy metal band Hunter. It was released on 15 November 2013 by Tune Project/Fonografika.

A music video was shot for the song "Imperium uboju" which was directed by Mateusz Winkiel.

The album landed at number 1 on Polish Albums Chart, and dropped out three weeks later. On 14 May 2014 Imperium was certified Gold in Poland for selling 15,000 copies.

== Track listing ==
No.	Title	Lyrics	Music	Length
1.	"Imperium uboju"	Paweł Grzegorczyk	Paweł Grzegorczyk, Piotr Kędzierzawski	03:12
2.	"Imperium mæczety"	Paweł Grzegorczyk	Paweł Grzegorczyk, Piotr Kędzierzawski	03:31
3.	"Imperium zawiści orzeszpospolitej"	Paweł Grzegorczyk	Paweł Grzegorczyk, Konrad Karchut	03:35
4.	"Imperium miłości"	Paweł Grzegorczyk	Paweł Grzegorczyk	05:01
5.	"Imperium szczujszczura"	Michał Jelonek	Michał Jelonek	03:21
6.	"Imperium strachu"	Paweł Grzegorczyk	Paweł Grzegorczyk	04:28
7.	"Imperium diabła"	Michał Jelonek	Michał Jelonek	03:39
8.	"Imperium waraciwara"	Paweł Grzegorczyk	Paweł Grzegorczyk, Piotr Kędzierzawski	04:41
9.	"Imperium trujki"	Paweł Grzegorczyk	Paweł Grzegorczyk	06:10
Total length:				37:38

== Credits ==
Hunter

- Paweł "Drak" Grzegorczyk - lead and backing vocals, guitars, sound engineering, editing, producing
- Piotr "Pit" Kędzierzawski - guitars, backing vocals, sound engineering, editing
- Michał "Jelonek" Jelonek - violin, backing vocals
- Konrad "Simon" Karchut - bass guitar, backing vocals
- Dariusz "Daray" Brzozowski - drums
- Arkadiusz "Letki" Letkiewicz - percussion, backing vocals

Additional musicians

- Tomasz "Kasprol" Kasprzyk - violin (9)
- Adrian Grzegorczyk - piano (8)

Production

- Jacek Miłaszewski - mixing, mastering
- Andrzej "Aka" Karp - sound engineering, editing, bass guitar (9)
- Michał "Mashtal" Rypień - sound engineering, editing
- Patryk "Maliniak" Malinowski - sound engineering, editing
- Aleksander Ikaniewicz - photography
