= Kulka (surname) =

Kulka is a surname. Notable people with the surname include:

- Gabriela Kulka (born 1979), Polish musician
- Glenn Kulka (born 1964), Canadian professional wrestler
- János Kulka (actor) (born 1958), Hungarian actor
- János Kulka (conductor) (1929–2001), Hungarian conductor and composer
- Leopoldine Kulka (1872–1920), Austrian writer and editor
- Otto Dov Kulka (1933-2021), Israeli historian
