= Black'n'Roll (album) =

Studio album by Black River
- Released: 21 September 2009 (Poland); 26 February 2010 (Europe); 20 July 2010 (North America)
- Recorded: 2009
- Studios: RG Studio, Gdańsk; Sonus Studio, Izabelin
- Genres: Heavy metal, stoner rock
- Length: 41:15
- Labels: Mystic, Indie Distribution, Armoury, Eagle Rock
- Producer: Black River

Black River chronology
| Black River (2008) | Black'n'Roll (2009) | Trash (2010) |

Professional ratings
Review scores
| Source | Rating |
|---|---|
| Teraz Rock | 4/5 stars |
| AllMusic | 3/5 stars |

Black'n'Roll is the second studio album by the Polish metal band Black River. It was released via Mystic Production on 21 September 2009.

Videos were made to the songs "Black'n'Roll" and "Lucky in Hell", starring actress Magdalena Cielecka, both directed by Roman Przylipiak.

Drum parts were recorded on DW kit owned by Piotr Kozieradzki from progressive rock band Riverside. Some choir parts were made by members of Black River official message board.

== Track listing ==
1. "Barf Bag" – 3:46
2. "Isabel" – 3:24
3. "Lucky in Hell" – 4:46
4. "Black'n'Roll" – 2:05
5. "Breaking the Wall" – 3:48
6. "Jumping Quenny Flash" – 3:25
7. "Too Far Away" – 3:53
8. "Loaded Weapon" – 3:40
9. "Morphine" – 4:50
10. "Like a Bitch" – 3:22
11. "Young'n'Drunk" – 4:16

== Personnel ==
- Maciej Taff – lead vocals, lyrics
- Tomasz "Orion" Wróblewski – bass, backing vocals
- Dariusz "Daray" Brzozowski – drums, backing vocals
- Piotr "Kay" Wtulich – guitar, backing vocals
- Artur "Art." Kempa – guitar, backing vocals
- Arkadiusz Malczewski – sound engineering
- Andrzej Karp – sound engineering
- Roman Przylipiak – cover art, layout
- Tomasz Zalewski – mix
- Jacek Gawłowski – mastering

== Charts ==
| Chart (2009) | Peak position |
|---|---|
| Polish Albums Chart | 20 |
