= Dariusz Brzozowski =

Polish heavy metal drummer

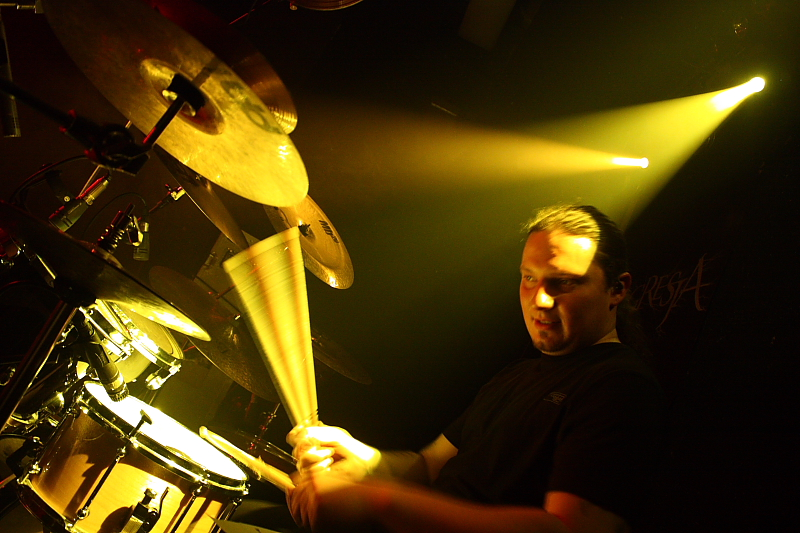
- Brzozowski with Hunter in 2009

Background information
- Also known as: Daray
- Born: 30 January 1980 (age 46); Nowy Dwór Mazowiecki, Poland
- Genres: Heavy metal, death metal, black metal, thrash metal
- Occupation: Musician
- Instruments: Drums, percussion
- Years active: 1997–present
- Label: Nuclear Blast

Dariusz "Daray" Brzozowski (born 30 January 1980), is a Polish heavy metal drummer. Brzozowski has played with such bands as Vader, Black River, Jelonek, Armagedon, Arysta, Azarath, Faust, Neolithic, Crionics, Autumn: Death, Imperial Age, Kayzen, Crystal Abyss, Nerve, Insidious Disease and Pyorrhoea. He currently plays in Dimmu Borgir, Vesania, Symbolical, Hunter, and Masachist.

He endorses Meinl, Tama, Czarcie Kopyto and Regal Tip. He used to endorse Pearl, Premier, Yamaha, Vic Firth, and Balbex.

== Drums setup ==
Meinl Cymbals

- 13" Byzance Brilliant Fast Hihat
- 14" Byzance Brilliant Fast Hihat
- 17" Mb20 Heavy Crash
- 18" Mb20 Heavy Crash
- 19" Mb20 Heavy Crash
- 22" Mb20 Heavy Bell Ride
- 18" Mb20 Rock China
- 20" Mb20 Rock China
- 18" Soundcaster Custom China
- 10" Generation X Filter China
- 12" Generation X Filter China
- 14" Generation X Filter China

Tama Drums Tama Starclassic Performer B/B – Volcanic Burst (VCB) Bass Drum: 22"x18" (x2) Tom Tom: 10" x 8" Tom Tom: 12" x 10" Tom Tom: 14" x 11" Floor Tom: 16" x 16" Floor Tom: 18" x 16" Snare Drum: S.L.P. Black Brass 14" x 6,5"

Hardware
- Remo drumheads
- Wincent drumsticks

== Discography ==
With Neolithic

- 2003 Team 666

With Dimmu Borgir

- 2010 Abrahadabra
- 2018 Eonian
- 2026 Grand Serpent Rising

With Black River

- 2008 Black River
- 2009 Black'n'Roll
- 2010 Trash

With Masachist

- 2009 Death March Fury
- 2012 Scorned

With Vader

- 2004 Beware the Beast
- 2004 The Beast
- 2005 The Art of War
- 2006 Impressions in Blood
- 2007 And Blood Was Shed in Warsaw
- 2008 XXV

With Faust

- 2009 From Glory to Infinity

With Jelonek

- 2011 Revenge

With Hunter

- 2009 HellWood
- 2011 XXV lat później
- 2012 Królestwo
- 2013 Imperium

With Pyorrhoea

- 2004 Desire for Torment

With Nerve

- 2013 Fracture

With Arysta

- 2011 The 5 Ocean

With Christ Agony

- 2016 Legacy
