= Black River (band) =

Polish rock band

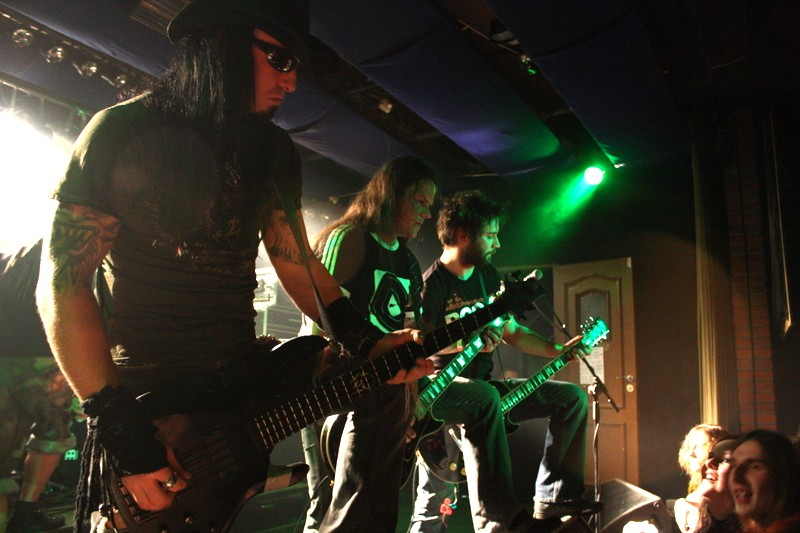
- Black River in 2008 (from left: Wróblewski, Wtulich, Kempa)

Background information
- Origin: Poland
- Genres: Heavy metal, stoner rock
- Years active: 2008–2010, 2018–present
- Labels: Mystic, Armoury/Eagle Rock
- Members: Tomasz "Orion" Wróblewski; Dariusz "Daray" Brzozowski; Piotr "Kay" Wtulich; Artur "Art." Kempa; Maciej Taff

Black River is a Polish stoner rock/heavy metal band. They were formed in 2008 by Tomasz Wróblewski (bass), Dariusz Brzozowski (drums), Piotr "Kay" Wtulich (guitar), Artur "Art." Kempa (guitar), and Maciej Taff (vocals).

In 2009, the band was nominated for Fryderyk, an annual award in Polish music.

According to an interview on 9 February 2014, Wróblewski revealed the band's hiatus since 2010 was permanent due to problems with vocalist Taff's health. However, on 16 July 2018, it was announced the band had reunited and was in the studio recording their upcoming third album, due in 2019. The band released Humanoid on 12 April 2019.

On 2 June 2022, the band announced their new album, Generation aXe, would be released on 24 June.

== Discography ==
=== Studio albums ===
Title	Album details	Peak chart positions
Title	Album details	POL
Black River	Released: 19 May 2008; Label: Mystic; Formats: CD	–
Black'n'Roll	Released: 21 September 2009; Label: Mystic, Armoury/Eagle Rock; Formats: CD, digital download	20
Humanoid	Released: 12 April 2019; Label: Mystic; Formats: CD, digital download	–
Generation aXe	Released: 24 June 2022; Label: Crusader, Golden Robot; Formats: CD, digital download	32
"—" denotes a recording that did not chart or was not released in that territory.

=== Compilation albums ===
Title	Album details
Trash	Released: 6 December 2010; Label: Mystic; Formats: CD

=== Music videos ===
Title	Director(s)	Album	Year
"Free Man"	Roman Przylipiak	Black River	2008
"Punky Blonde"	Roman Przylipiak	Black River	2008
"Silence"	Roman Przylipiak	Black River	2008
"Black'n'Roll"	Roman Przylipiak	Black'n'Roll	2009
"Lucky in Hell"	Roman Przylipiak	Black'n'Roll	2010
