= KSU (band) =

Polish punk rock band

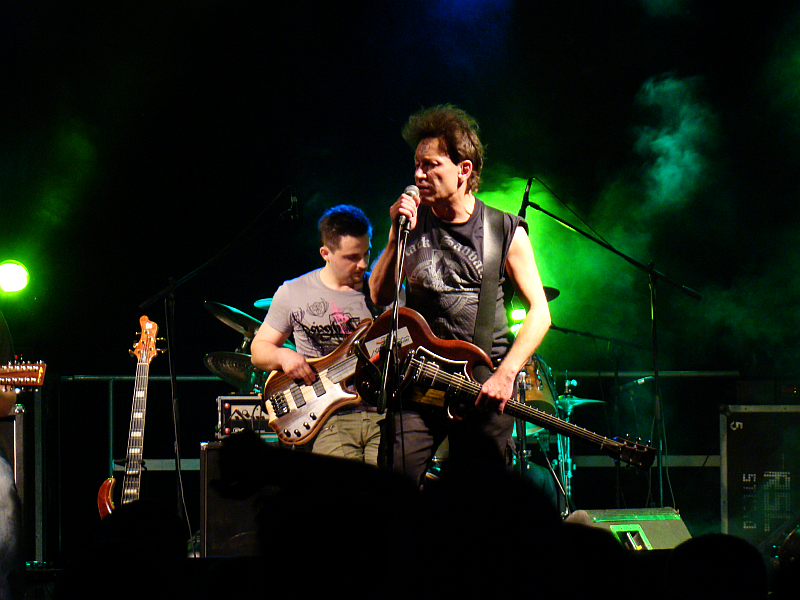
- KSU live in Sanok, June 4, 2011

Background information
- Origin: Ustrzyki Dolne, Poland
- Genres: Punk rock
- Years active: 1977–present
- Labels: Mystic Production
- Members: Eugeniusz "Siczka" Olejarczyk; Jarosław "Jasiu" Kidawa; Leszek "Dziaro" Dziarek; Paweł "Kojak" Gawlik; Mateusz "Joseph" Sowa
- Past members: Bogdan Augustyn "Bohun"; Leszek Tomkow "Plaster"; Bogdan Tutak "Tuptuś"; Artur Solarz; Adam Michno "Dżordż"; Bartłomiej Kądziołka "QQŚ"; Dariusz Dziuroń "Nero"; Wojciech Bodurkiewicz "Ptyś"; Mirosław Wesołkin; Waldemar Kuzianik "Burek"; Waldemar Moskal "Valdi"; Piotr Sewerniak "Seru"; Zygmunt Waśko "Zyga" "Cewka"; Jakub Ziemba "Kuba"; Marcin Nowak "Nowy"; Grzegorz "Gekon"; Rafał "Sysy" Grela; Paweł Tylko "Prezo"; Sebastian Sipa; Sebastian Mnich "Sebek"; Erik Bobella "Tuna"
- Website: ksu.art.pl

KSU is a Polish punk rock band and one of the earliest representatives of punk in Poland, founded in 1977 in the southeastern town of Ustrzyki Dolne in the Bieszczady Mountains. Young musicians from Ustrzyki met to play covers of Black Sabbath, Deep Purple and Led Zeppelin songs which they had heard on a radio tuned into Western European radio stations, beyond the Iron Curtain. In 1978 they came up with the name KSU, which comes from car license plates, issued by the Krosno Voivodeship authorities for vehicles from Ustrzyki Dolne. With a new name came new music - KSU was now motivated by Sex Pistols, Damned, and UK Subs.

In 1980, due to friendship with Kazimierz Staszewski, KSU travelled across Poland to Kolobrzeg, to participate in the New Wave Festival. The band was dubbed a sensation, but soon afterwards its members were one after one called up to the Polish Army and KSU ceased to exist. In 1988 KSU recorded an LP "Pod prąd" ("Against the flow"), which was warmly welcomed by its fans.

Currently KSU consists of four members, including Olejarczyk. Its lyrics are in most cases written by Maciej Augustyn, the brother of former singer Bogdan "Bohun" Augustyn.

== Members ==
=== Current line-up ===
- Eugeniusz Olejarczyk ("Siczka") – guitar, vocals
- Jarosław Kidawa ("Jasiu") – guitar, backing vocals
- Paweł Gawlik ("Kojak") – bass guitar
- Leszek Dziarek ("Dziaro") – drums, backing vocals, programming
- Piotr Leszega ("Piter") - guitar, backing vocals

== Discography ==
- Pod prąd (1988)
- Ustrzyki (1990)
- Moje Bieszczady (1993)
- Na 15 lecie! (1994)
- Bez prądu (1995)
- 21 (1999)
- Ludzie bez twarzy (2002)
- Kto cię obroni Polsko (2004)
- Nasze słowa (2005) POL No. 14
- Akustycznie XXX-lecie (2008) POL No. 21
- Dwa Narody (2014)

=== Live albums ===
Title	Album details
Przystanek Woodstock 2005	Released: June 5, 2006; Label: Złoty Melon; Formats: CD

=== Video albums ===
Title	Video details
Przystanek Woodstock 2005	Released: June 5, 2006; Label: Złoty Melon; Formats: DVD

== Sources ==
- "• Kultura - Nowe pokolenie KSU [22-09-2004]". Archived from the original on 2009-02-01.
