= Jelonek (album) =

Studio album by Jelonek
- Released: December 3, 2007
- Recorded: Maybe.B Recording House and Sonus Studio (Izabelin C)
- Genre: Symphonic metal, progressive rock, progressive metal, art rock
- Length: 49:42
- Label: Mystic Production
- Producer: Michał "Jelonek" Jelonek, Andrzej "Aka" Karp

Jelonek chronology
Jelonek (2007)	Revenge (2011)

Professional ratings
Review scores
Source	Rating
Teraz Rock	3/5 stars

Jelonek is the debut instrumental album by Polish violinist Jelonek. It was released on December 3, 2007 on Mystic Production.

A music video was shot for the song "BaRock".

== Track listing ==
No.	Title	Length
1.	"BaRock"	03:07
2.	"B.East"	03:30
3.	"Vendome 1212"	03:05
4.	"Akka"	02:36
5.	"Steppe"	04:52
6.	"A Funeral of a Provincial Vampire"	03:26
7.	"Lorr"	03:56
8.	"Beech Forest"	02:46
9.	"War in the Kids Room"	03:05
10.	"Miserere Mei Deus"	02:06
11.	"Mosquito Flight"	04:00
12.	"Machinehat"	03:08
13.	"Elephant's Ballet"	03:14
14.	"Pizzicato - Asceticism"	06:45
Total length:		49:36

== Personnel ==
Jelonek

- Michał "Jelonek" Jelonek - acoustic violin, six string electric violin, double bass

Additional Musicians

- Grzegorz "Brooz" Sławiński - drums, percussion
- Karol Ludew - drums, percussion
- Artur "Lipa" Lipiński - drums, percussion
- Mariusz "Maniek" Andraszek - bass guitar
- Robert "Rebe Fifi" Fijałkowski - guitars, baritone guitar
- Paweł "Drak" Grzegorczyk - guitars
- Andrzej "Aka" Karp - bass guitar
- Justyna Osiecka - cello
- Dawid Somló - percussion

Production

- Andrzej Karp, Zbyszek Szmatłoch, Magda Dudzik - sound engineering
- Michał "Jelonek" Jelonek, Andrzej "Aka" Karp - production
- Andrzej Karp, Zbyszek Szmatłoch - mixing
- Mentalporn (Katarzyna Zaremba, Piotr "Qras" Kurek) - cover art and layout

Note

- Recorded and mixed at Maybe.B Recording House And Sonus Studio (Izabelin C)
- Mastered at Maybe.B Cutting Room
