= Frontside (band) =

Polish metalcore/deathcore band

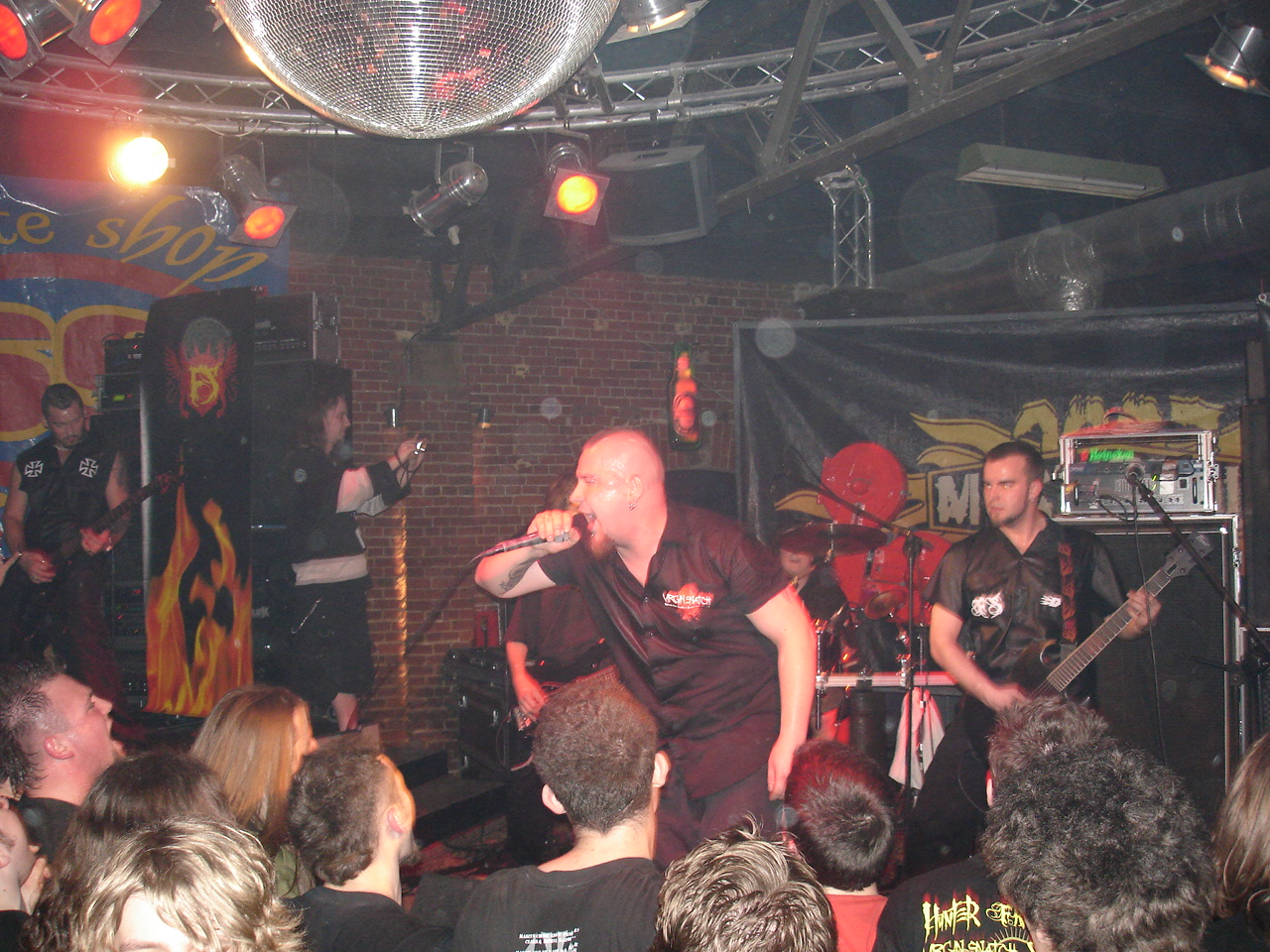
- Frontside performing live at Mystic Festival in Opole (2007)

Background information
- Origin: Sosnowiec, Poland
- Genres: Metalcore; deathcore; rap metal (early)
- Years active: 1993–present
- Labels: Mystic Production, Metal Mind Productions

Frontside is a Polish metalcore / deathcore band from Sosnowiec, Poland that Astek and Demon formed in 1993. They compose and perform their songs in English and Polish.

== History ==
Astek and Demon formed the band in 1993 in Sosnowiec, Poland. Early Frontside productions were hardcore songs with influence from other genres, such as hip-hop. Compositions often included rapping, samples and scratching. These experiments ended on Our Is Kingdom... in 2001, replaced with riffs akin to thrash and death metal and harsh vocals. In mid-2003, Auman, from Polish thrash metal band Totem, joined as the new vocalist when Astek left, and Daron became the new guitarist after Simon left. They changed the band's direction toward death metal, with characteristic riffs and death growling. Along with those aspects, the band incorporated clean vocals.

== Members ==
Current members

- Mariusz "Demon" Dzwonek – rhythm guitar, backing vocals (1993–present)
- Wojciech "Novak" Nowak – bass (1997–present)
- Marcin "Auman" Rdest – lead vocals (2004–2021)
- Dariusz "Daron" Kupis – lead guitar (2003–present)
- Tomasz "Toma" Ochab – drums (2005–present)

Former members

- Sebastian "Astek" Flasza – lead vocals (1993-2003)
- Szymon "Simon" Dzieciaszek – rhythm guitar (1996-2003)
- Paweł "Destroy" Śmieciuch – drums (1996-2003)
- Wojciech Sitarz – rhythm guitar (1993-1995)
- Robert Siwek – rhythm guitar (1993-1995)
- Michał Markowicz – bass (1993-1997)

Touring musicians

- Łukasz "Pachu" Pach - lead vocals

Timeline

== Discography ==
=== Studio albums ===
Title	Album details	Peak chart positions
Title	Album details	POL
Nasze jest królestwo... / Our is kingdom...	Released: 2001; Label: Metal Mind Productions; Formats: CD	—
I odpuść nam nasze winy / Forgive Us Our Sins	Released: 2002; Label: Mystic Production; Formats: CD, CS	19
Zmierzch bogów. Pierwszy krok do mentalnej rewolucji / Twilight of the Gods. A First Step to the Mental Revolution	Released: October 11, 2004; Label: Mystic Production; Formats: CD, digital download	—
Absolutus	Released: October 23, 2006; Label: Mystic Production; Formats: CD	—
Teoria konspiracji	Released: November 17, 2008; Label: Mystic Production; Formats: CD, digital download	—
Zniszczyć wszystko	Released: October 25, 2010; Label: Mystic Production; Formats: CD, digital download	43
Sprawa jest osobista	Released: March 5, 2014; Label: Mystic Production; Formats: CD, digital download	11
Prawie martwy	Released: March 18, 2015; Label: Mystic Production; Formats: CD, digital download	—
Zmartwychwstanie	Released: September 14, 2018; Label: Mystic Production; Formats: CD, digital download	12
"—" denotes a recording that did not chart or was not released in that territory.

=== Music videos ===
Year	Titile	Directed	Album
2002	"Bóg stworzył szatana"	Kvass	I odpuść nam nasze winy
2004	"God Created Satan"	Kvass	Forgive Us Our Sins
2005	"Naszym przeznaczeniem jest płonąć"	Shary	Zmierzch bogów. Pierwszy krok do mentalnej rewolucji
2006	"Wybraniec"	Inbornmedia, Maciej Pawełczyk, Radosław Wikiera, Jakub Jakielaszek	Absolutus
2006	"Wspomnienia jak relikwie"	Frontside	Absolutus
2008	"Zapalnik"	Frontside	Teoria konspiracji
2011	"Dopóki moje serce bije"	Mateusz Winkiel, Mania Studio	Zniszczyć wszystko
2012	"Granica rozsądku"	Marcin Łaskawiec, Michał Pukowiec	Zniszczyć wszystko
2012	"Zniszczyć wszystko"	Mania Studio	Zniszczyć wszystko
2014	"Legenda"	Mania Studio	Sprawa jest osobista
