= Luxtorpeda (band) =

Polish rock band

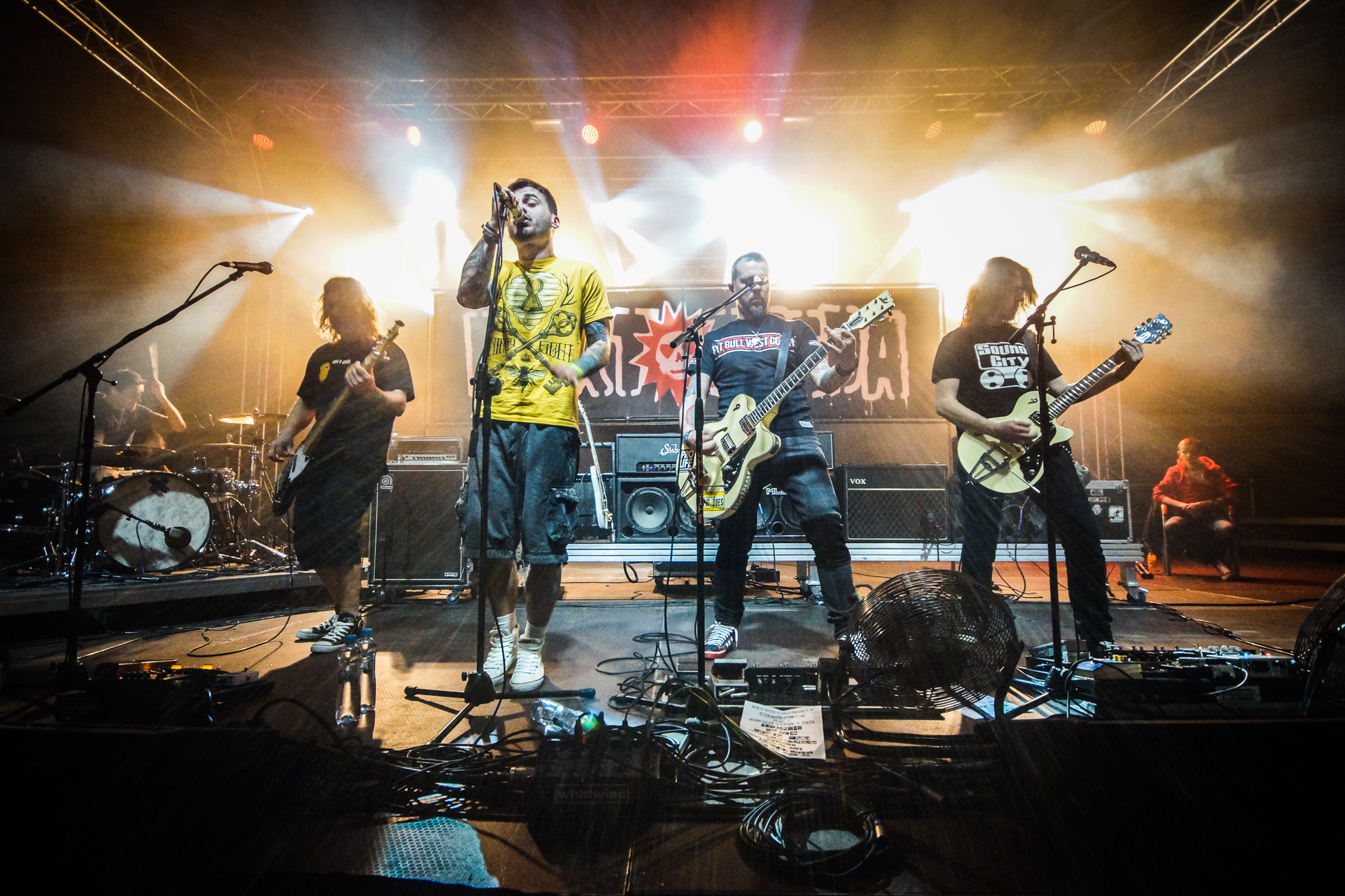
- Luxtorpeda at Rocket Festiwal 2014 in Warsaw

Background information
- Origin: Poznań, Poland
- Genres: Hard rock, stoner rock
- Years active: 2010–present
- Labels: Stage Diving Club, Metal Mind Productions
- Members: Robert Friedrich; Robert Drężek; Krzysztof Kmiecik; Tomasz Krzyżaniak; Przemysław Frencel
- Website: luxtorpeda.net

Luxtorpeda is a Polish rock band, founded in 2010. The current line-up consists of Robert 'Litza' Friedrich (vocals, guitar), Robert 'Drężmak' Drężek (guitar), Krzysztof 'Kmieta' Kmiecik (bass), Tomasz 'Krzyżyk' Krzyżaniak (drums), and Przemysław 'Hans' Frencel (vocals). The band has released eight studio albums, Luxtorpeda (2011), Robaki (2012), A morał tej historii mógłby być taki, mimo że cukrowe, to jednak buraki (2014), MYWASWYNAS (2016), Anno Domini MMXX (2020), Elekroluxtorpeda (2021), Omega (2022) and Szukamy guza (2025).

== History ==
Luxtorpeda was founded in 2010 in Poznań by Robert Friedrich, guitarist of several popular bands (Turbo, Kazik Na Żywo, Acid Drinkers, 2Tm2,3, Arka Noego). He was joined by guitarist Robert Drężek, bassist Krzysztof Kmiecik, and drummer Tomasz Krzyżaniak, who had played with Armia and Turbo. In 2011, the band was joined by Przemysław Frencel, a rapper of Pięć Dwa Dębiec.

On May 9, 2011, the band released its debut album, titled Luxtorpeda, with a hit song "Autystyczny". The album debuted at number 15 on the Polish sales chart OLiS. It was named the 'Album of the Year' by Teraz Rock magazine in 2012, and the band won several other awards ('Debut of the Year', 'Band of the Year', and 'Song of the Year' and 'Music Video of the Year' for "Autystyczny").

On May 9, 2012, Luxtorpeda released its second album, Robaki, which debuted at number one in Poland.

The band's third record, titled A morał tej historii mógłby być taki, mimo że cukrowe, to jednak buraki, was released on April 1, 2014. It is promoted by the lead radio single "Mambałaga", accompanied by a music video (see below). In its first week, the album charted at number three in Poland, winning with Shakira's self-titled tenth studio album which also debuted that week. The following week, it peaked at number one.

== Band members ==
- Robert "Litza" Friedrich – co-lead vocals, lead guitar (2010–present)
- Krzysztof "Kmieta" Kmiecik – bass, backing vocals (2010–present)
- Tomasz "Krzyżyk" Krzyżaniak – drums (2010–present)
- Robert "Drężmak" Drężek – rhythm guitar (2010–present)
- Przemysław "Hans" Frencel – co-lead vocals, rap vocals (2011–present)

== Discography ==
=== Studio albums ===
Title	Album details	Peak chart position
Title	Album details	POL
Luxtorpeda	Released: May 9, 2011; Label: S.D.C./Metal Mind	15
Robaki	Released: May 9, 2012; Label: S.D.C./Metal Mind	1
A morał tej historii mógłby być taki, mimo że cukrowe, to jednak buraki	Released: April 1, 2014; Label: S.D.C./Metal Mind	1
MYWASWYNAS	Released: April 1, 2016; Label: S.D.C./Universal Music	3
Anno Domini MMXX	Released: October 1, 2020; Label: S.D.C./Metal Mind	1
Elekroluxtorpeda	Released: May 9, 2021; Label: S.D.C./Metal Mind	2
Omega	Released: April 27, 2022; Label: S.D.C./Metal Mind	17
Mój Trup Jest Większy Niż Twój	Released: December 13, 2024; Label: S.D.C./Metal Mind	–
Szukamy guza	Released: December 27, 2025; Label: S.D.C./Metal Mind	2

=== Live albums ===
Title	Album details	Peak chart position
Title	Album details	POL
Przystanek Woodstock 2011	Released: June 27, 2012; Label: S.D.C./Metal Mind; Formats: CD+DVD	31
Koncert w Stodole	Released: December 10, 2012; Label: Metal Mind; Formats: CD+DVD	—
"—" denotes a recording that did not chart or was not released in that territory.

=== Video albums ===
Title	Video details
XVII Przystanek Woodstock	Released: December 12, 2012; Label: Złoty Melon; Formats: DVD

=== Music videos ===
Title	Year	Director	Album	Ref.
“Autystyczny”	2011	Mateusz Stachowski	Luxtorpeda	
“Za wolność”	2011	Sound Park	Luxtorpeda	
“Hymn”	2012	brat Patefon	Robaki	
“Wilki dwa”	2012	M Studio	Robaki	
“Gimli”	2013	Łukasz Jankowski	Robaki	
“Tajne znaki”	2013	brat Patefon	Robaki	
“Mambałaga”	2014	Mateusz Otremba, brat Patefon	A morał tej historii mógłby być taki, mimo że cukrowe, to jednak buraki	
“Pusta studnia”	2014	Łukasz Jankowski	A morał tej historii mógłby być taki, mimo że cukrowe, to jednak buraki	
“J.U.Z.U.T.N.U.K.U.”	2015	Brend Group	A morał tej historii mógłby być taki, mimo że cukrowe, to jednak buraki	
“Nieobecny nieznajomy”	2015	Akademia Młodzieży, M Studio	A morał tej historii mógłby być taki, mimo że cukrowe, to jednak buraki	
“Silnalina”	2016	brat Patefon	MYWASWYNAS	
“Siódme”	2016	Tomasz Madejski	MYWASWYNAS	
“Hołd”	2020	Paweł Rybarczyk	Anno Domini MMXX	
“Przygotuj się na najlepsze”	2022	Marcin Jończyk	Omega	
