= Gaba Kulka =

Polish artist, songwriter, and performer (born 1979)

Gabriela Kulka
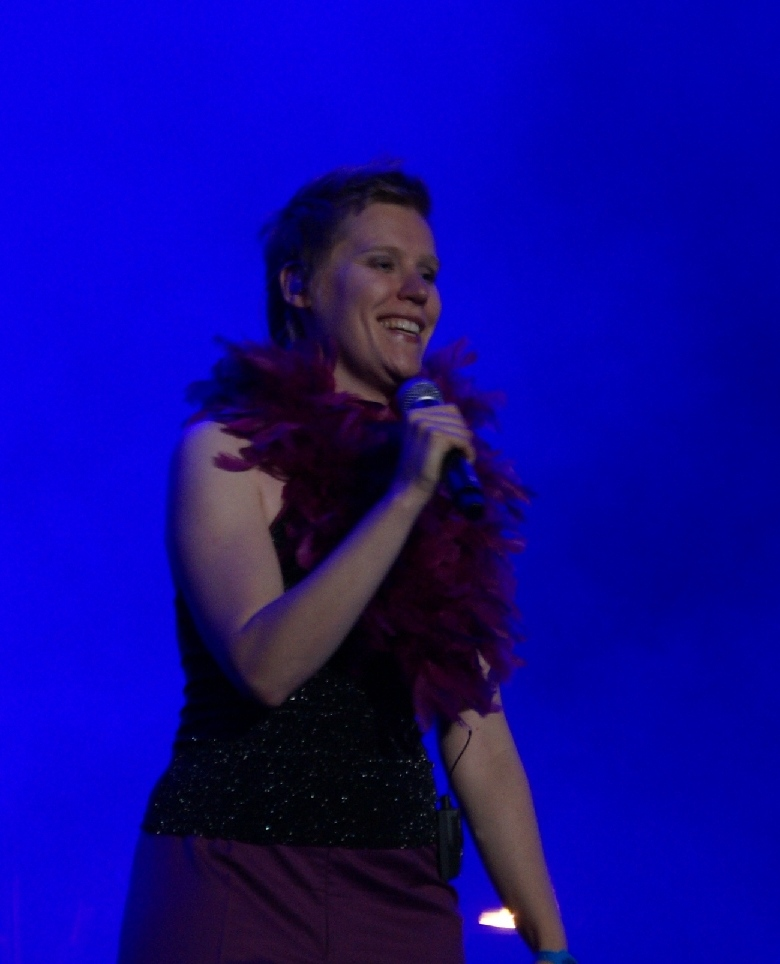
- Kulka in 2009

Background information
- Born: 1979 (age 46–47); Warsaw, Poland
- Genres: pop, indie pop, jazz
- Occupations: Musician, songwriter
- Instruments: piano, vocals
- Label: Mystic Production
- Website: www.gabakulka.com

Gabriela Konstancja Kulka-Stajewska (Gaba Kulka, born in 1979 in Warsaw, Poland) is an independent Polish artist, songwriter, and performer.

== Biography ==
Kulka comes from a family of musicians; her father was a Polish violinist and professor. She took eight years of classical violin lessons but later gravitated toward playing the piano.

Her early albums, "Between Miss Scylla and a Hard Place" (2003) and "Out" (2006), were independently produced. She also contributed to the covers compilation "Songs for Wolf," along with artists including Björk, Ozzy Osbourne, Neil Diamond, Stevie Nicks and The Church).

In 2009, her third album, "Hat, Rabbit," was released by the major label Mystic Production. The album achieved gold status in Poland, and the singles "Niejasności," "Kara Niny," and "Got a Song" were played alternative-oriented radio stations. That same year, she collaborated with Polish singer Konrad Kucz on the album "Sleepwalk."

== Musical style ==
Over a seven-year period of composing and recording, Gabriela Kulka cultivated a distinctive style that blends elements of dark musical theatre with jazz-influenced arrangements and an emphasis on poetic, unconventional lyricism. Her work reflects a balanced influence of Danny Elfman and Kate Bush, and demonstrates stylistic foundations in classical music, jazz, and pop traditions.

Artists she names as her closest inspirations are, firstly and undeniably - Kate Bush and Tori Amos, but also Peter Gabriel, Kurt Weill, Danny Elfman, The Mystic Knights of the Oingo Boingo, Chroma Key, Queen, ABBA, Bruce Dickinson, Iron Maiden (whose songs she performs live) and Madonna.

== Discography ==
=== Solo albums ===
Title	Album details	Peak chart positions	Sales	Certifications
Title	Album details	POL	Sales	Certifications
Out	Released: 12 November 2007; Label: Eblok; Formats: CD, digital download	47		
Hat, Rabbit	Released: 4 May 2009; Label: Mystic Production; Formats: CD, digital download	7	POL: 15,000+	POL: Gold
Wersje	Released: 4 November 2013; Label: Mystic Production; Formats: CD, digital download	25		
The Escapist	Released: 8 September 2014; Label: Mystic Production; Formats: CD, digital download	9		
Kruche	Released: 6 September 2016; Label: Mystic Production; Formats: CD, digital download	—		
"—" denotes a recording that did not chart or was not released in that territory.

=== Collaborative albums ===
Title	Album details	Peak chart positions
Title	Album details	POL
Sleepwalk (with Konrad Kucz)	Released: 26 October 2009; Label: Jazzboy Records; Formats: CD, digital download	11
Rebeka nie zejdzie dziś na kolację (with Młynarski Plays Młynarski)	Released: 10 October 2010; Label: Mystic Production; Formats: CD	14
Baaba Kulka (with Baaba)	Released: 21 March 2011; Label: Mystic Production; Formats: CD	14
"—" denotes a recording that did not chart or was not released in that territory.

=== Video albums ===
Title	Album details
Live Rabbit	Released: 26 November 2010; Label: Mystic Production; Formats: DVD

=== Music videos ===
Year	Title	Directed	Album	Ref.
2009	"Niejasności"	—	Hat, Rabbit	
2009	"Got a Song" (with Konrad Kucz)	Filip Kovcin	Sleepwalk	
2014	"Wielkie wrażenie"	Mads Hemmingsen	The Escapist	
