= Empatic (band) =

Polish death metal band

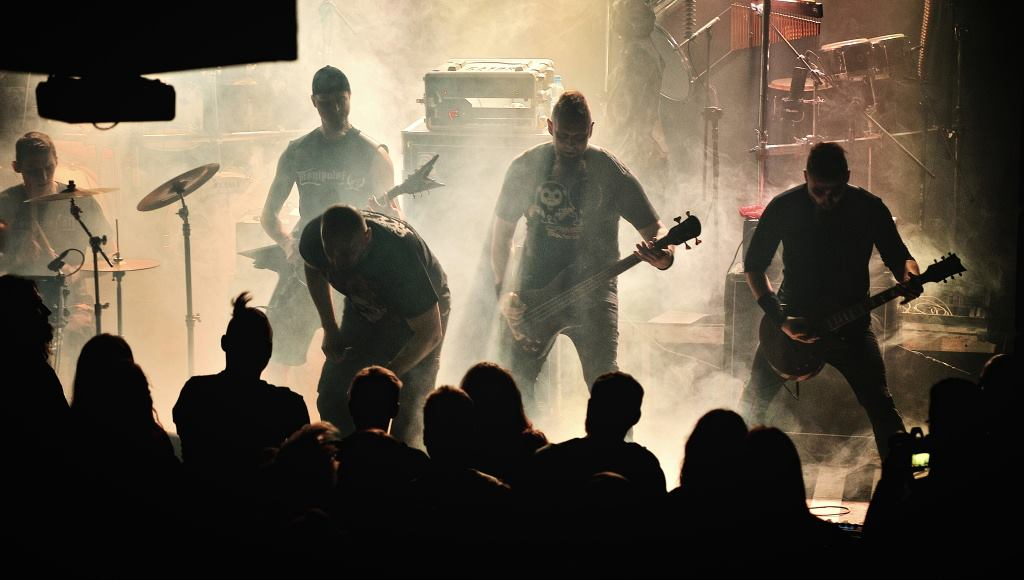
- EmpatiC during the concert in Białystok, 2017

Background information
- Origin: Ostrołęka, Poland
- Genres: Death metal Thrash metal
- Years active: 2005–present
- Labels: Terrasound, Psycho
- Members: Maciej Rochaczewski; Włodzimierz Małaszek; Przemysław Cikacz; Krzysztof Bendarowicz; Piotr Kołakowski
- Website: www.empatic.com

Empatic is a Polish death metal band based in Ostrołęka. Since forming in December 2005, they have released one full-length album.

The band was formed in 2005 by vocalist Maciej Rochaczewski and bassist Włodzimierz "Włodas" Małaszek. The first line-up consisted of Jakub Bednarski (guitar) and Piotr "Kinal" Kinalski (drums). In 2007, the band released their first demo entitled Promo, which consisted of five original compositions and Orchestral Manoeuvres in the Dark cover "Enola Gay". Later that year, Empatic played their first gig outside their hometown with Hate, Crionics and others during the Panzerfest II festival in Warsaw.

Their first full-length album, Gods of Thousand Souls, was released in 2010 by WM Psycho, exclusively in Poland. 2012 saw the release across world, by Terrasound Records.

== Band members ==
Current members

- Maciej Rochaczewski – vocals (2005)
- Włodzimierz "Włodas" Małaszek – bass (2005–)
- Krzysztof "Criss" Bendarowicz – drums (2008–2009, 2012–)
- Jakub Bednarski – guitar (2005–2012, since 2013)
- Radosław Chrzanowski – guitar (2017–)

Former members

- Przemysław "Sesyl" Cikacz – guitar (2006–2017)
- Piotr "Kain" Kołakowski – guitar (2012–2013)
- Piotr "Kinal" Kinalski – drums (2005–2007)
- Jarosław "YopeQue" Śliwka – drums (2009–2012)

== Discography ==
Studio albums

- Gods of Thousand Souls (2010, Psycho Rec.(PL) / 2012, Terrasound Rec. (EU))
- Ruined Landscape (2014, Terrasound Records)

Singles

- Niewinny (2017)

Demos

- Promo (2007)
