= Happysad =

Polish rock band

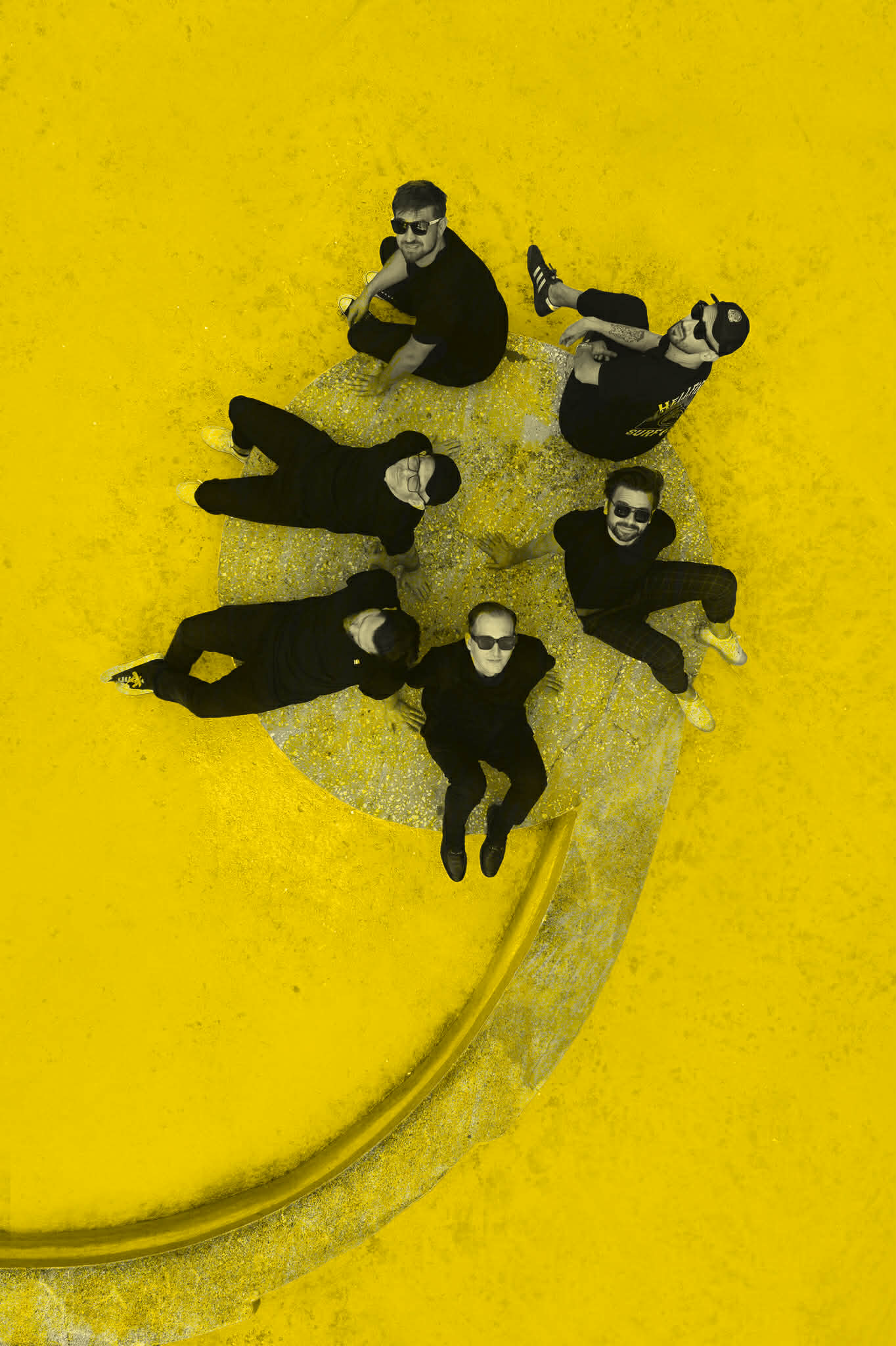
- Happysad in 2026 Clockwise, From top: Jakub Kawalec, Łukasz Cegliński, Michał Bąk, Artur Telka, Jarosław Dubiński, Maciej Ramisz

Background information
- Origin: Skarżysko-Kamienna, Poland
- Genres: Rock
- Years active: 2001–present
- Labels: S.P. Records, Mystic Production
- Members: Kuba "Quka" Kawalec; Łukasz "Pan Latawiec" Cegliński; Artur "Artour" Telka; Jarosław "Dubin" Dubiński; Maciej "Ramzej" Ramisz; Michał "Misiek" Bąk
- Website: happysad.art.pl

Happysad (stylized as happysad) is a Polish rock band. The band plays melodic rock with elements of punk and reggae. It was created in Skarżysko-Kamienna in 2001 by musicians who had been playing since 1995 under the name HCKF (Hard Core’owe Kółko Filozoficzne, "Hardcore Philosophical Circle"). In 1997 the name was changed to Happy Sad Generation. The name Happysad was established in 2002.

Their first demo was released in 2002, contents of which were included in their debut album Wszystko jedno, released in 2004. Its music was described as "regressive rock completed with characteristic lyrics".

The band have been on multiple national tours in Poland. Happysad have performed at the Pol'and'Rock Festival in 2012, 2013, 2019, 2020 and 2026.

== Members ==
=== Current line-up ===
- Jakub „Quka” Kawalec – vocals, guitar, lyrics
- Łukasz „Pan Latawiec” Cegliński – guitar
- Artur „Artour” Telka – bass
- Jarosław „Dubin” Dubiński – drums
- Maciej „Ramzej” Ramisz – musical keyboard, guitar, vocals
- Michał „Misiek” Bąk – saxophone, musical keyboard, vocals

=== Former members ===
- Paweł Półtorak – drums (2002)
- Piotr „Szosiu” Szostak – drums (2003)
- Maciek „Ponton” Sosnowski – drums (2003/2006)

== Discography ==
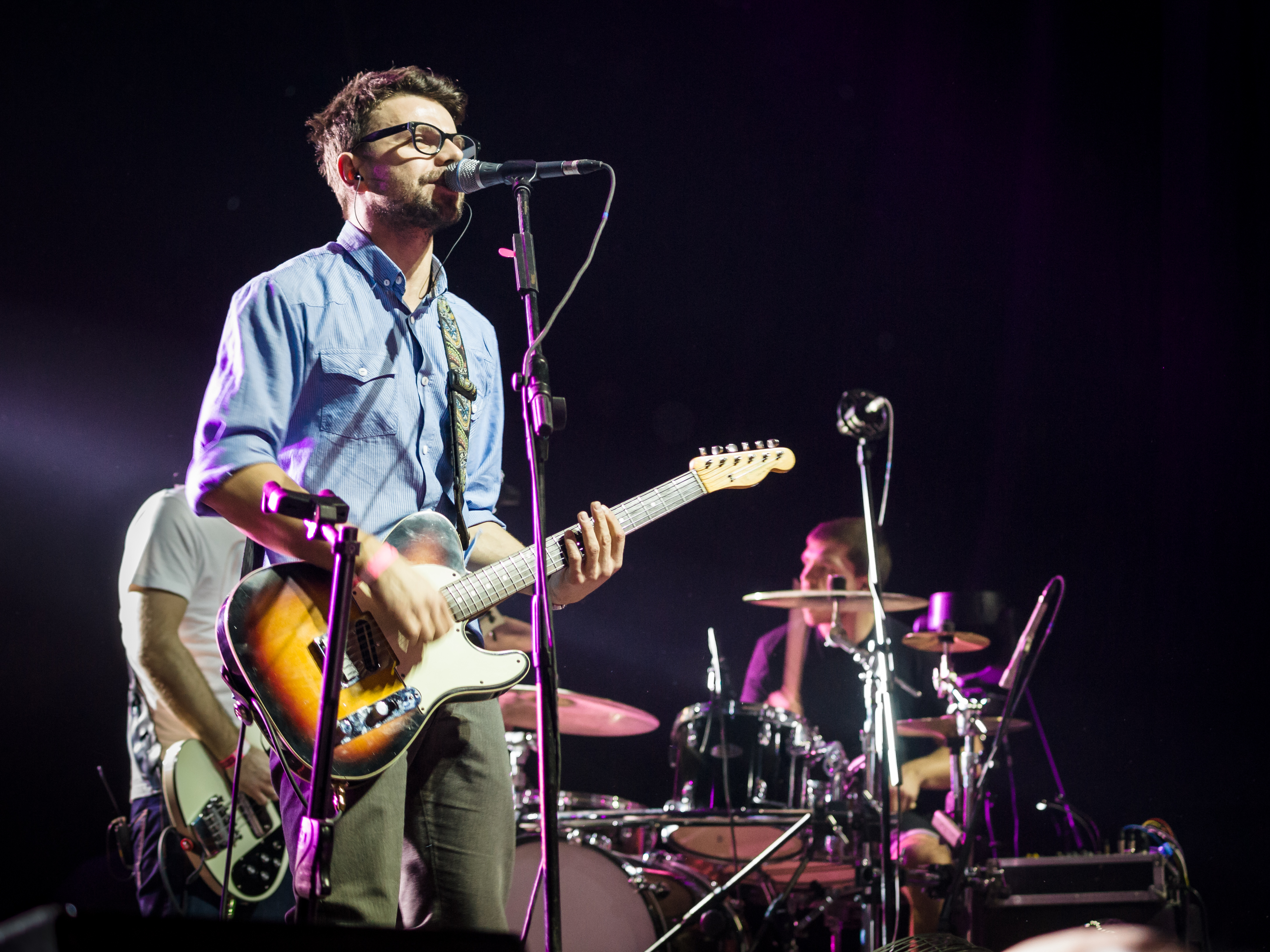
Jakub Kawalec "Quka", vocalist of happysad.

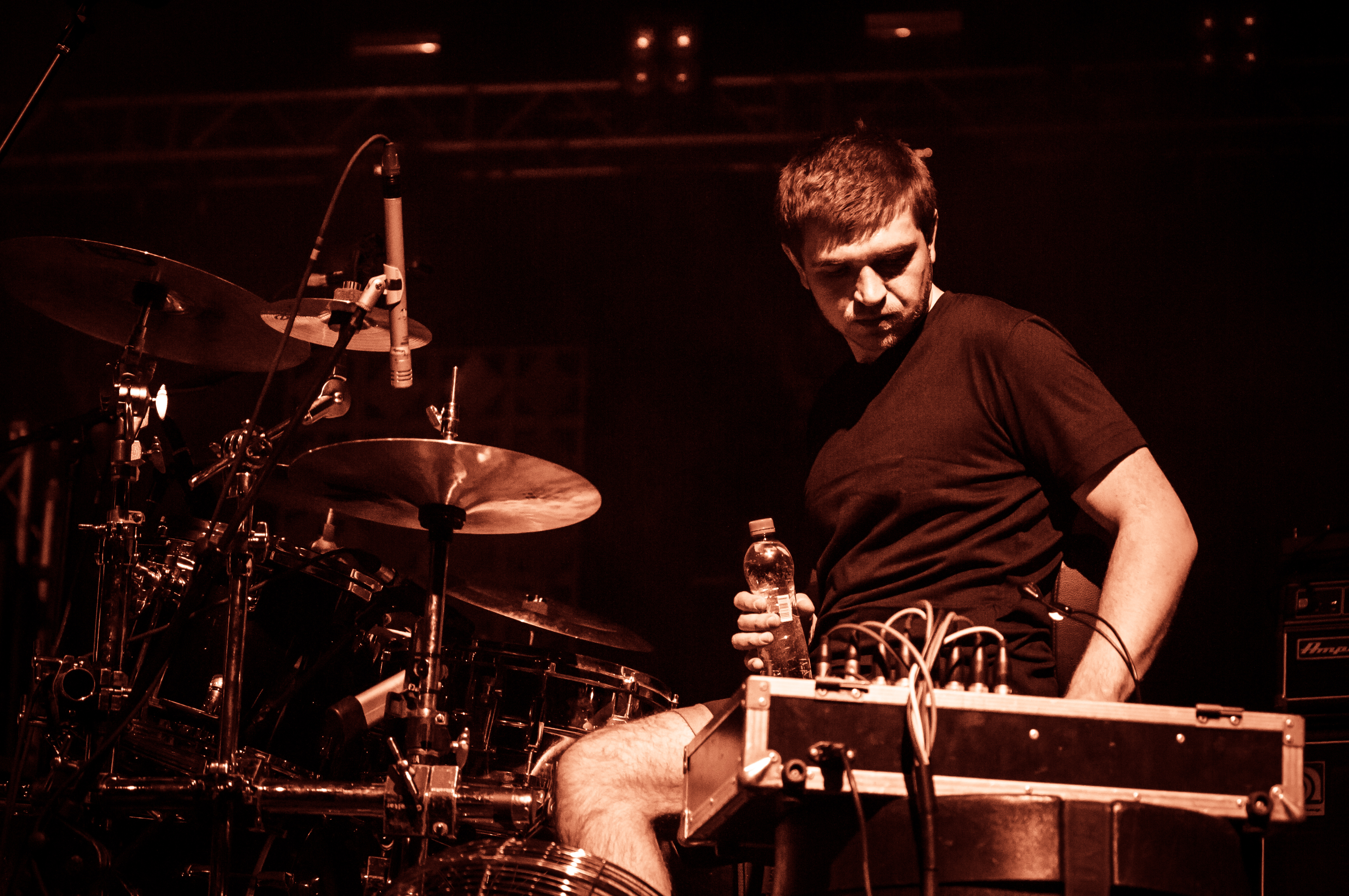
Jarosław Dubiński "Dubin", drummer of happysad.

=== Studio albums ===
| Title | Album details | Peak chart positions | Sales | Certifications |
| Title | Album details | POL | Sales | Certifications |
|---|---|---|---|---|
| Wszystko jedno | Released: July 5, 2004; Label: S.P. Records; Formats: CD, digital download | — | | |
| Podróże z i pod prąd | Released: October 17, 2005; Label: S.P. Records; Formats: CD, digital download | 21 | | |
| Nieprzygoda | Released: September 10, 2007; Label: S.P. Records; Formats: CD, digital download | 1 | | |
| Mów mi dobrze | Released: October 19, 2010; Label: Mystic Production; Formats: CD, digital download | 7 | POL: 15,000+ | POL: Gold |
| Ciepło/Zimno | Released: September 5, 2012; Label: Mystic Production; Formats: CD, digital download | 1 | POL: 15,000+ | POL: Gold |
| Jakby nie było jutra | Released: October 22, 2014; Label: Mystic Production; Formats: CD, digital download | 1 | POL: 15,000+ | POL: Gold |
| Ciało obce | Released: February 10, 2017; Label: Mystic Production; Format: CD, digital download | 1 | | |
| Rekordowo letnie lato | Released: November 29, 2019; Label: Mystic Production; Format: CD, digital download | | | |
"—" denotes a recording that did not chart or was not released in that territory.

=== Tribute albums ===
| Title | Album details |
|---|---|
| Zadyszka | Released: October 10, 2011; Label: Mystic Production; Formats: CD+DVD, digital download |

=== Live albums ===
| Title | Album details |
|---|---|
| Na żywo w STUDIO | Released: February 16, 2009; Label: Mystic Production; Formats: CD, digital download |
| Przystanek Woodstock 2013 | Released: December 4, 2013; Label: Złoty Melon; Formats: CD+DVD |

=== Video albums ===
| Title | Album details |
|---|---|
| Na żywo w STUDIO | Released: November 28, 2008; Label: Mystic Production; Formats: DVD |
