= Farben Lehre =

Polish punk band

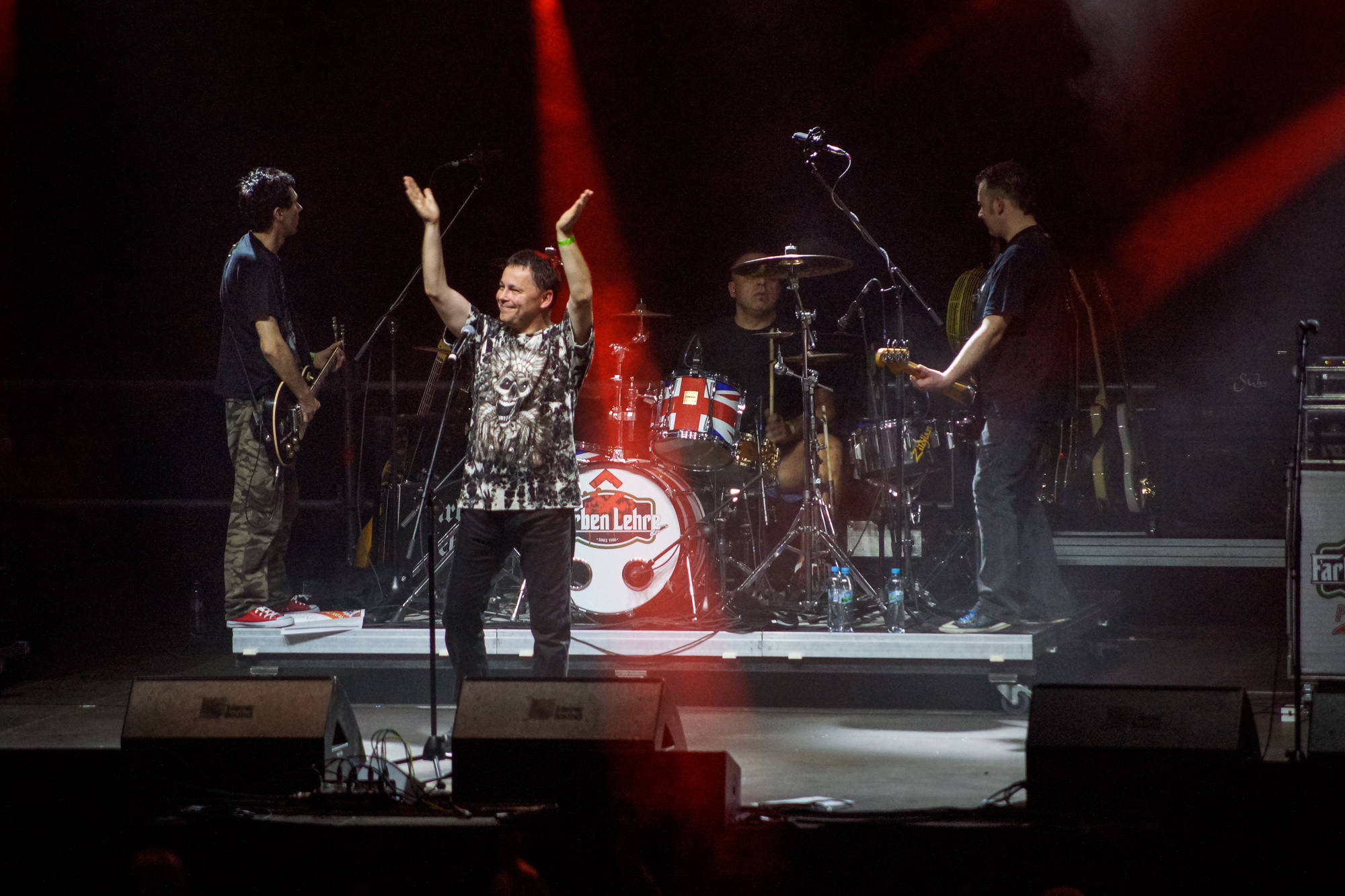
- Farben Lehre, 2014

Background information
- Origin: Płock, Poland
- Genres: Punk rock Reggae rock Alternative rock
- Years active: 1986 – present
- Labels: Arston, D'Art Hause, Music Corner Records, Psy Wojny Records, MKM, Dywizja Kot & MTJ, Offmusic, Mystic Production, Rockers Publishing
- Members: Wojciech Wojda; Konrad Wojda; Filip Grodzicki; Gerard Klawe
- Past members: Marek Knap; Piotr Kokoszczyński; Paweł Nowak; Piotr Bartuś; Bogdan Pawłowski; Krzysztof Sieczkowski; Bogdan Kiciński; Irek Bukowski; Paweł Małecki; Jacek Trafny; Robert Chabowski
- Website: Official Website

Wojciech Wojda
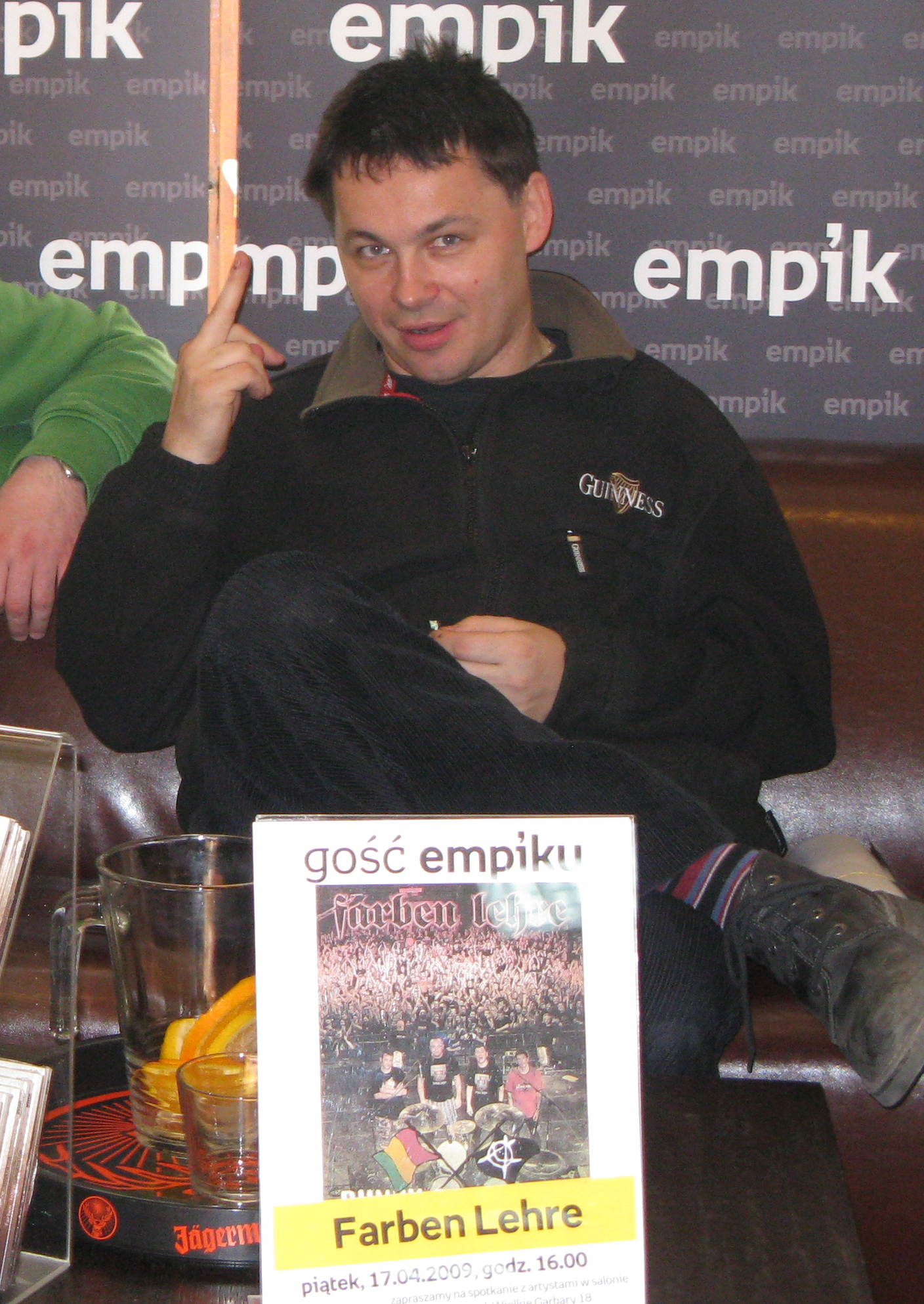
- Wojda in 2009

Background information
- Born: 28 December 1966 (age 59); Płock, Poland
- Genres: Punk rock, reggae
- Occupations: Musician, promoter
- Instrument: Vocals

Farben Lehre is a Polish punk band formed in 1986 by Wojciech Wojda and Marek Knap, playing their first concert on October 21 of that year in Płock. In 1990 the group won the coveted Jarocin Festival prize. The band's first album, Bez Pokory, was released in 1991, and since then they have been quite successful on the local and international punk rock scene.

Since 2004 Farben Lehre has been the promoter of the Punky Reggae Live festival.

== Members ==
=== Current members ===
- Wojciech Wojda – lyrics, vocals
- Konrad Wojda – guitar
- Filip Grodzicki – bass
- Gerard Klawe – drums

=== Past members ===
- Marek Knap – drums (1986/1987)
- Piotr Kokoszczyński – bass, vocals (1986/1998)
- Paweł Nowak – acoustic guitar, vocals (1986/1987)
- Piotr Bartuś – drums (1987/1988)
- Bogdan Pawłowski – keyboards, vocals (1987/1989)
- Krzysztof Sieczkowski – drums (1988/1991)
- Bogdan Kiciński – guitar, vocals (1989/1998)
- Irek Bukowski – bass (1990)
- Paweł Małecki – guitar, vocals (1993/1995)
- Jacek Trafny – drums (1999/2002)
- Robert Chabowski – guitar, vocals (1986/1993 and 2002/2004)
- Adam Mikołajewski – drums

== Discography ==
=== Studio albums ===
Title	Album details	Peak chart positions
Title	Album details	POL
Bez pokory (without submission)	Released: October 1991; Label: Arston; Formats: LP, CS	—
My maszyny (we machines)	Released: April 1993; Label: Arston; Formats: CD, CS	—
Nierealne ogniska (unreal bonfires)	Released: June 1995; Label: D'art House; Formats: CD	—
Insekty (insects)	Released: March 1995; Label: Music Corner Records; Formats: CD, CS	—
Zdrada (treachery)	Released: June 1996; Label: Music Corner Records; Formats: CD, CS	—
Garażówka (garage party)	Released: December 1996; Label: Psy Wojny Records; Formats: CD	—
Atomowe zabawki (atomic toys)	Released: August 20, 2001; Label: Music Net England; Formats: CD	—
Pozytywka (music box)	Released: May 29, 2003; Label: Offmusic; Formats: CD	—
Farbenheit	Released: September 12, 2005; Label: Rockers Publishing; Formats: CD, digital download	42
Snukraina (dreamland)	Released: February 18, 2008; Label: Mystic Production; Formats: CD	17
Ferajna (bunch)	Released: October 12, 2009; Label: Rockers Publishing; Formats: CD, digital download	—
Achtung 2012	Released: September 11, 2012; Label: Lou & Rocked Boys; Formats: CD, digital download	32
Projekt Punk	Released: December 9, 2013; Label: Lou & Rocked Boys; Formats: CD, digital download	32
"—" denotes a recording that did not chart or was not released in that territory.

=== Video albums ===
Title	Video details
Przystanek Woodstock 2006	Released: May 19, 2008; Label: Złoty Melon; Formats: DVD
Przystanek Woodstock 2013: Projekt Punk	Released: June 2, 2014; Label: Złoty Melon; Formats: DVD
