= Hunter (band) =

Polish heavy metal band

HUNTER
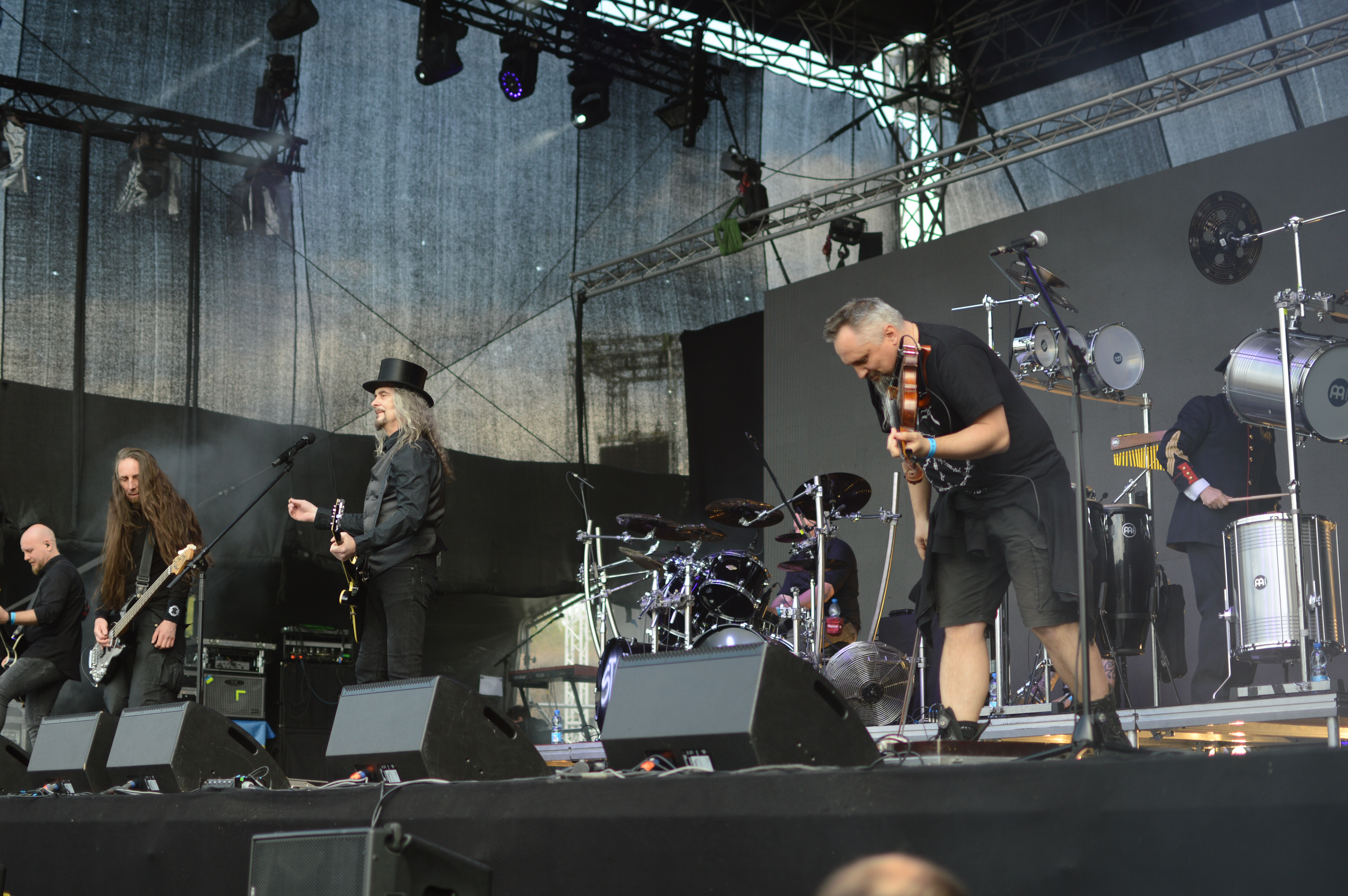
- Hunter during a concert in Wrocław in 2022

Background information
- Origin: Szczytno
- Genres: Thrash metal; heavy metal
- Years active: 1985–present
- Labels: Meridian Publishing, Rubicon, Złoty Melon, Metal Mind Productions, Mystic Production, Tune Project
- Members: Paweł "Drak" Grzegorczyk; Konrad "Saimon" Karchut; Piotr "Pit" Kędzierzawski; Michał Jelonek; Dariusz "Daray" Brzozowski; Arkadiusz "Letki" Letkiewicz
- Past members: Grzegorz "Brooz" Sławiński; Tomasz "Goliash" Goljaszewski; Marek "Kosa/Carlos" Kosakowski; Robert "Mooha" Ropiak; Cezary Studniak; Michał "Grzybek" Grzymysławski; Janusz Enerlich
- Website: Official Website

Hunter is a Polish heavy metal band. The band was formed in 1985 in Szczytno, Masuria.

== History ==
=== 1995–2002 ===
The band recorded the first studio material in the German studio APN Neustadt Gmbh.

The debut album entitled Requiem was released in December 1995. It was a thrash/power metal with a lot of classical solos and influences.

In 2001, the Live publishing went to stores, which included nine recordings recorded during the biggest polish festival - Przystanek Woodstock '96 and additionally a studio version of the song "When I'm dying..." and music videos for "Freedom" and "Screamin 'Whispers” from the debut CD.

At the beginning of 2002, during the concert of the Great Orchestra of Christmas Charity in Szczytno a video was recorded for "When I'm dying ...". The song - both in audio and video version - appeared on radio and television stations, occupying #1 place continuously since the first entry on the list of video clips of the VIVA Polska station, until the end of the list's existence. Overtaking music videos of such powers as Slayer or Cradle of Filth. "When I'm dying ..." also showed the new musical face of the group.

=== 2003–2006 ===
The second studio album - Medeis - was released in 2003. At that time, the violinist - Michał Jelonek joined the band. The musical style was very different from the debut album and became Hunter's trademark. The reviewers described the band's style as "soul metal".

The next album T.E.L.I... went to stores in the spring of 2005, and in December its English version was also released. He was very positively received by fans and critics.

In November 2006, the group released a two-disc compilation entitled HolyWood. A concert recording of two Przystanek Woodstock Festivals (from 2003 and 2004) as well as additional materials was recorded on the DVD / CD Ep format.

=== 2008–2011 ===
At the end of 2008, Hunter's co-founder - Grzegorz "Brooz" Sławiński left the group. In his place Dariusz "Daray" Brzozowski joined the band (Dimmu Borgir, ex-Vader, Vesana, Black River).

April 2009 brought a new album by the band released by Mystic Production and titled HellWood. Due to the fact that the lyrics referred to the band's favorite films, two paraphile clips were created for the songs "Labirynt Fauna" and "Strasznik". The fans reaction caused that Hellwood became another breakthrough release in Hunter's history, and songs such as "Labirynt Fauna", "ŚmierciŚmiech", "Dura Lex Sed Lex" and "Arges" are still concert "killers" without which it is hard to imagine a band live.

In 2011, the publishing Hunter - XXV years later was released by Mystic Production, in 2DVD / 3CD format, containing two concerts and a lot of additional audio and videobonus material, as well as photo galleries, many interviews and archival document entitled Hunter - XXV years before. The first of the concerts on this release was recorded in the Wrocław „Hala Stulecia” and the second in the Warsaw club "Stodoła".

=== 2012–2015 ===
At the beginning of 2012, the band had been officially joined by Arek "Letki" Letkiewicz playing for several years with a band as a percussionist. From now until today Hunter appears in this unchanged line-up.

In the summer of 2012, the band went to the countryside and recorded most of the material for two new records. Hunter invited the classic Kantata bohemian choir to collaborate in several songs. After completing the recordings, the first of them was published - Królestwo (Kingdom). The second, entitled Imperium (Empire) appeared a year later, being the musical and verbal continuity of Królestwo and made its debut at the #1 spot on the polish nationwide sales list of OLIS. Both records became Gold.

In 2013, the band was again invited to Przystanek Woodstock Festival, where it presented its version of "Metal History". Together with the invited guests, Hunter performed such metal classics as Metallica's "Master of Puppets", System of a Down's "Chop Suey!" and Led Zeppelin's "Kashmir" as well as songs by Rage Against the Machine, Pantera, Iron Maiden, Deep Purple, Rammstein and concert closer - AC/DC's "Highway to Hell" with the participation of all guests and spontaneous violin solo creator of the Festival - Jurek Owsiak.

In 2015, Hunter released a nearly two-hour concert for free on its official YouTube channel, which was to be prepared earlier as the next official DVD and finally became a band gift for its fans.

=== 2016–present ===
After a four-year publishing break, filled with concerts, in early 2016 appeared the first trailer of the new album. It was the song "NieWolnOść" (NotFreedom), also with the guest participation of the Kantata choir. Due to its message, it caused a lot of controversy. The first polish „March of freedom” used it as a flag song. A few months later, on 7 November 2016, the entire studio album, entitled NieWolność, was released. It was also released on its own by the band.

The next band's release was Arachne in March 2019.

2020 saw the release of a 3CD BOX - XXXV (Anniversary Remastered Edition)

In April 2022 Hunter published audio and very moving video to a new single - "Коли вмираю..." (Ukrainian-language version of their most popular song - "When I'm dying...", with multi languages subtitles option) as a protest against Russian's aggression in Ukraine.

== Band members ==
- Pawel DRAK Grzegorczyk – vocals, guitar
- Piotr PIT Kędzierzawski – guitar
- Michał JELONEK Jelonek – violins
- Konrad SAIMON Karchut – bass
- Dariusz DARAY Brzozowski – drums
- Arkadiusz LETKI Letkiewicz – percussions

== Discography ==
=== Studio albums ===
Title	Album details	Peak chart positions	Sales	Certifications
Title	Album details	POL	Sales	Certifications
Requiem	Released: December 1995; Label: Meridian Publishing; Formats: CD	—		
Medeis	Released: 7 March 2003; Label: Rubicon/Pomaton EMI; Formats: CD	—		
T.E.L.I...	Released: 30 May 2005; Label: Metal Mind Productions; Formats: CD	7		
HellWood	Released: 14 April 2009; Label: Mystic Production; Formats: CD, digital download	9		
Królestwo	Released: 5 November 2012; Label: Tune Project/Mystic Production; Formats: CD	4	POL: 15,000+	POL: Gold
Imperium	Released: 15 November 2013; Label: Tune Project/Fonografika; Formats: CD, digital download	1	POL: 15,000+	POL: Gold
Niewolność	Released 4 November 2016	7		
Arachne	Released: 8 March 2019	36		
"—" denotes a recording that did not chart or was not released in that territory.

=== Other releases ===
Title	Album details
Live	Released: 3 December 2001; Label: Rubicon; Formats: CD
Przystanek Woodstock	Released: 7 June 2004; Label: Złoty Melon/Pomaton EMI; Formats: DVD
HolyWood	Released: 30 November 2006; Label: Metal Mind Productions; Formats: DVD+CD
XXV lat później	Released: 27 June 2011; Label: Mystic Production; Formats: DVD, CD, digital download

=== Music videos ===
Year	Title	Directed	Album
1995	"Freedom"	TVP/Luz, Tomasz Żąda	Requiem
1995	"Screamin' Whispers"	TVP/Luz, Tomasz Żąda	Requiem
2002	"Kiedy umieram"	Marcin Klinger, Paweł "Drak" Grzegorczyk	Medeis
2003	"Fallen"	Maciej Mydlak, Marcin Klinger, Paweł "Drak" Grzegorczyk	Medeis
2005	"T.E.L.I."	Tomasz Mączka	T.E.L.I...
2005	"Pomiędzy niebem, a piekłem"	Marcin Klinger	T.E.L.I...
2009	"Labirynt Fauna"	Dariusz Szermanowicz, Grupa 13	HellWood
2009	"Strasznik"	Mateusz Winkiel, Mania Studio	HellWood
2012	"Trumian Show"	Mateusz Winkiel, Mania Studio	Królestwo
2012	"PSI"	Mateusz Winkiel, Mania Studio	Królestwo
2013	"O wolności"	—	Królestwo
2013	"Imperium uboju"	Mateusz Winkiel	Imperium

== Awards ==
Fryderyk Award
Year	Album	Category	Note
2010	HellWood	album of the year rock/metal	Nominated
2012	XXV lat później	album of the year metal	Nominated
