= Mystic Production =

Polish independent record label

- Founded: 1995
- Founder: Barbara Mikuła
- Distributors: Indie Recordings, Armoury Records, Eagle Rock, Mascot Records
- Genre: Heavy metal, rock, pop, jazz
- Country of origin: Poland
- Location: Skała, Poland
- Official website: mystic.pl

Mystic Production is a Polish independent record label. It was founded by Barbara Mikuła in 1995 in Skała.

The company was initially releasing and distributing heavy metal music, including early albums by artists such as Sceptic, Asgaard and Virgin Snatch. It has since expanded and has been releasing rock, punk rock, alternative rock, progressive rock and pop artists, and its roster currently includes names such as Behemoth, Acid Drinkers, Coma, Czesław Śpiewa, Grzegorz Turnau, Gaba Kulka, Happysad and KSU, among others.

Mystic Production operates also in Czech Republic and Slovakia with office in Horní Suchá.

Since 1996 label owns and runs Mystic Art music magazine (ISSN 1427-5538).

== Artists ==
=== Current ===
- Acid Drinkers
- Akurat
- Anita Lipnicka
- Armagedon
- Artrosis
- Artur Andrus
- Audiofeels
- Bartłomiej Świderski
- Behemoth (Poland only)
- Bennebox
- BiFF
- Blindead
- Camero Cat
- Christ Agony
- Chupacabras
- Coma
- Cuba de Zoo
- Czesław Śpiewa
- Decapitated (Poland only)
- Dick4Dick/D4D
- Dezerter
- Digit All Love
- Disperse (Poland only)
- Djerv (Poland and Czech Republic only)
- Emma Dax
- Frontside
- Gaba Kulka
- Grzegorz Turnau
- Habakuk
- Happysad
- Himills Bach
- Indios Bravos
- Indukti (Poland only)
- Iluzjon
- Julia Marcell (Poland only)
- John Porter
- Jelonek
- Karolina Skrzyńska
- Kat & Roman Kostrzewski
- Kombajn do Zbierania Kur po Wioskach
- KSU
- L.Stadt
- Leniwiec
- Lunatic Soul (Poland only)
- Mademoiseille Karen
- Maria Peszek
- Mariusz Lubomski
- Mjut
- None
- Olaf Deriglasoff
- Organek
- Orkiestra Dni Naszych
- Piotr Bukartyk
- Piotr Rogucki
- Peter Pan
- Pogodno
- Proghma-C
- Projekt Warszawiak
- Riverside (Poland only)
- Roman Kostrzewski
- Searching For Calm
- Sceptic
- Sorry Boys
- Stan Miłości i Zaufania
- Ścigani
- Tides From Nebula (Poland only)
- Titus' Tommy Gunn
- The Boogie Town
- The Complainers
- Thy Disease
- The Saintbox
- UnSun (Poland only)
- Virgin Snatch
- Votum
- Większy Obciach
- Wilson Square
- Wojtek Mazolewski Quintet

=== Former ===
- Amorphis
- Asgaard
- Bajzel
- Black River (Poland only; disbanded)
- Brown
- Cemetery of Scream (Poland only)
- Cochise
- Cold Passion (disbanded)
- Corruption
- Dive3d (disbanded)
- Farben Lehre
- Halina Mlynkova
- Hefeystos (disbanded)
- Hermh (Poland only)
- Hunter
- Jacek Lachowicz
- Kat
- Lao Che
- Michał Jurkiewicz
- Mouga (disbanded)
- Natalia Przybysz
- Neolithic (disbanded)
- Pandemonium
- Pneuma (disbanded)
- Oberschlesien
- Ocean
- Rootwater (disbanded)
- Sadness (disbanded)
- Tehace
- Totentanz
- Vader (Poland only)
- Vesania (Poland only)
- Zacier
