= Michał Jelonek =

Polish musician and composer

Michal Jelonek
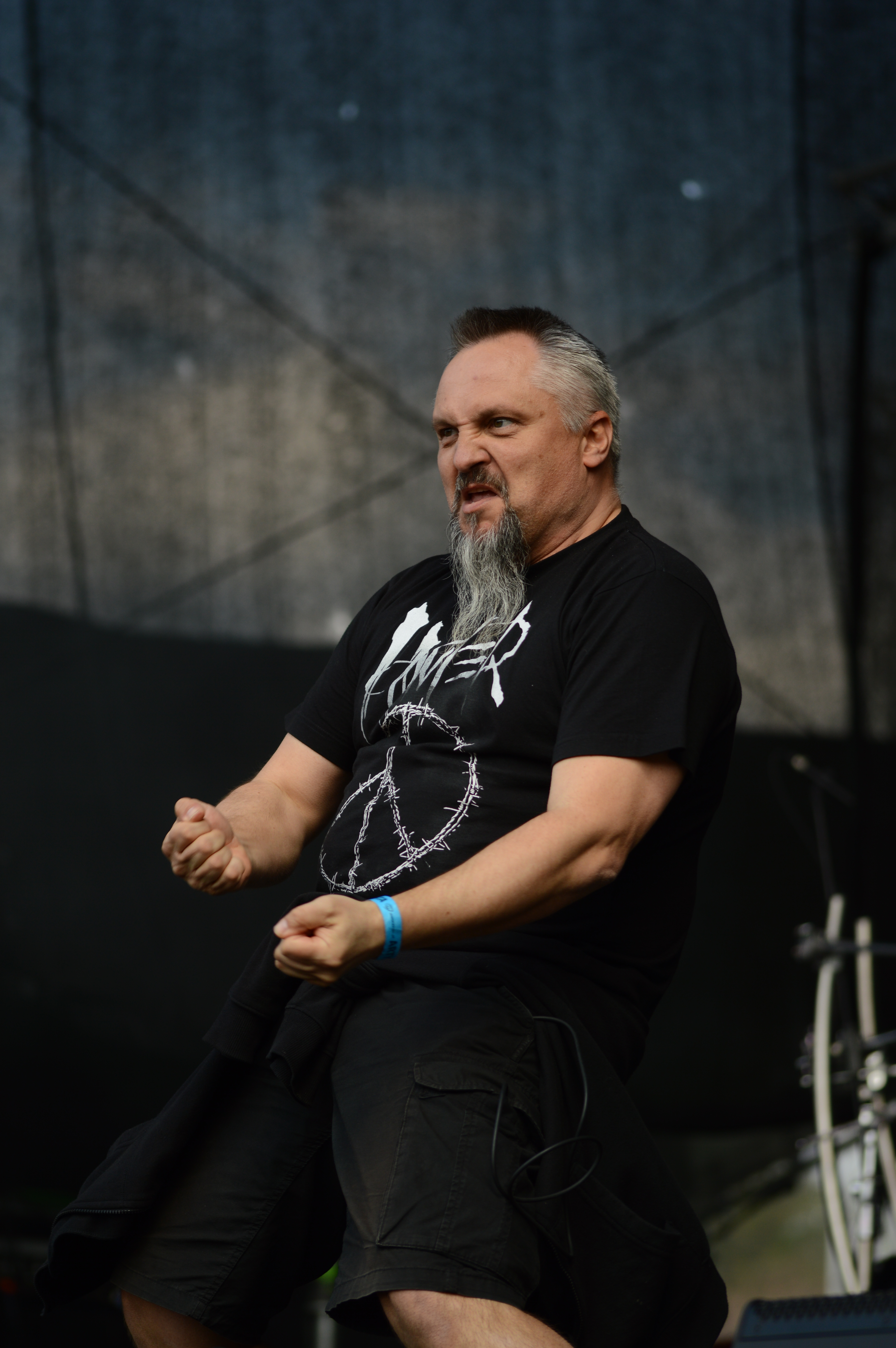
- Michał Jelonek, 2022

Background information
- Origin: Kielce, Poland
- Genres: Classical music, rock, pop, folk, thrash metal, heavy metal, hard rock, symphonic metal, progressive rock, progressive metal
- Occupation: Musician
- Instrument(s): Violin, viola, double bass, keyboards
- Years active: 1989–present
- Labels: Mystic Production
- Website: www.jelonek.art.pl

Michał Jelonek (born 30 May 1971), also known as Jelonek, is a Polish musician and composer. He specializes in violin.

He is a member of bands Hunter and Orkiestra Dni Naszych, and former member of Ankh. In 2007 Jelonek released his first, self-titled solo album.

== Early life ==
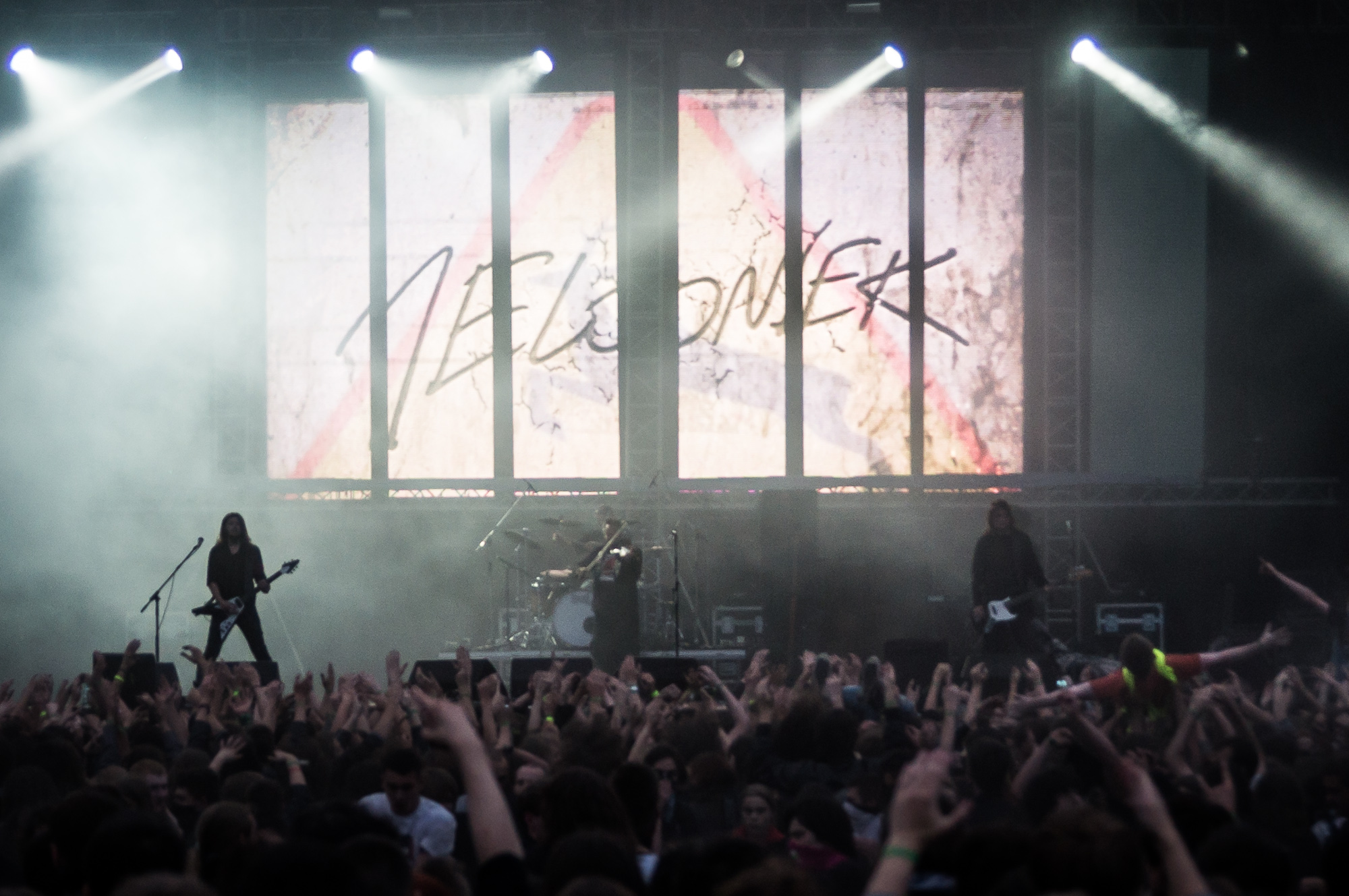
Jelonek performing with live band at Ursynalia Festival in Warsaw, Poland in 2012

He was born in Kielce, Poland. He learned to play the violin from Professor Andrzej Zuzański. He received his Diploma in 1989 when he performed Ludwig van Beethoven's Violin Concerto in D major, accompanied by the Kielce Philharmonic Orchestra. Michal toured with the Symphonic Orchestra and the Chamber Orchestra of the Kielce Philharmonic and later performed with the String Quintet Collegium Musicum from 1989 to 1994 and the Theatre Diaspora from 1992 to 1994.

== Work ==
He has performed with many Polish bands between 1992 and 2008 including Ankh, Closterkeller, De Press, Firebirds, Grejfrut, Hunter, Kasa, Lizar, Lzy, Mafia, Maybe-b, Orkiestra Dni Naszych, Perfect, Szwagierkolaska, Teatr Kobiet, Tosteer, T-Raperzy znad Wisły, and Wilki. He also performed with Maryla Rodowicz, Ilona Sojda, Wojciech Gąsowski, and Stan Borys.

Michal Jelonek has been featured on over 30 albums ranging from classical to pop, folk, rock and roll and heavy metal. He has performed over 1600 concerts in Poland, Brazil, the Czech Republic, Estonia, Lithuania, Latvia, Mexico, Germany, Russia, Slovakia, Sweden, Switzerland, and Ukraine. He has also recorded music for movies and commercials. He released his first solo album in 2007 titled Jelonek.

He has received several nominations for best Polish instrumentalist, in 1993 by Tylko Rock magazine and in 1994 by Siedlce Rock 94 among others.

== Band ==
Current members

- Michał Jelonek - acoustic and electric violin, viola, double bass (2007–present)

Live members

- Mariusz "Maniek" Andraszek - bass guitar (2007–present)
- Paweł "Chojo" Chojnacki - drums (2007–present)
- Leszek "Jebik" Kowalik - guitars (2007–present)
- Krzysztof "Krzysiu" Osiak - keyboards (2007–present)

Session musicians

- Grzegorz "Brooz" Sławiński - drums (2007)
- Karol Ludew - drums (2007)
- Artur "Lipa" Lipiński - drums (2007)
- Mariusz "Maniek" Andraszek - bass guitar (2007, 2011)
- Robert "Rebe Fifi" Fijałkowski - guitars (2007)
- Paweł "Drak" Grzegorczyk - guitars (2007)
- Andrzej "Aka" Karp - bass guitar (2007, 2011)
- Łukasz "Samba" Dmochewicz - drums (2011)
- Dariusz "Daray" Brzozowski - drums (2011)

== Discography ==
=== Solo albums ===
Title	Album details	Peak chart positions
Title	Album details	POL
Jelonek	Released: 3 December 2007; Label: Mystic Production; Formats: CD, digital download	–
Revenge	Released: 7 November 2011; Label: Mystic Production; Formats: CD, digital download	23
Classical Massacre	Released: 15 November 2019; Label: Mystic Production; Formats: CD, digital download	29
"—" denotes a recording that did not chart or was not released in that territory.

=== Video albums ===
Title	Album details
Przystanek Woodstock	Released: 10 December 2010; Label: Złoty Melon; Formats: DVD

=== Music videos ===
Title	Year	Directed	Album	Ref.
"BaRock"	2010	–	Jelonek	
"ViolMachine"	2012	Open Circles	Revenge	

=== Other appearances ===
Title	Year	Notes	Ref.
Ankh – Ankh	1994	band member	
Ankh – Koncert akustyczny	1994	band member	
Closterkeller – Scarlet	1995	session	
Ankh – ... będzie tajemnicą	1998	band member	
Firebirds – Trans...	1998	session	
Grejfrut – Tytuł płyty	2000	session	
Maryla Rodowicz – 12 najpiękniejszych kolęd	2001	session	
Maryla Rodowicz – Życie ładna rzecz	2002	session	
Spooko – Spooko Panie Wiśniewski	2003	session	
Ankh – Expect Unexpected	2003	band member	
Perfect – Schody	2004	session	
Ankh – Live in Opera '95	2004	band member	
Mafia – Vendetta	2005	session	
Łzy – The Best of 1996 – 2006	2006	session	
Freak of Nature – Fabryka zła	2008	session	
Kora – Metamorfozy	2008	session	
Love De Vice – Numaterial	2010	session	
Maciej Maleńczuk, Paweł Kukiz – Starsi panowie	2010	session	
Farben Lehre – Niezwyciężony	2010	session	
