= Live Eschaton =

Video by Behemoth
- Released: July 2000
- Recorded: 27 April 2000
- Studio: Studio Łęg in Kraków, Poland
- Genre: Blackened death metal
- Length: 45:41
- Label: Metal Mind
- Producer: Maria Miodunka, Tomasz Pomarański

Behemoth chronology
Satanica (1999)	Live Eschaton (2000)	Thelema.6 (2000)

Alternative cover
- Live Eschaton: The Art of Rebellion cover art

Professional ratings
Review scores
Source	Rating
AllMusic	3/5 stars

Live Eschaton is the first video album by Polish extreme metal band Behemoth. While originally released on VHS in 2000, a reissue was released on DVD as Live Eschaton: The Art of Rebellion in 2002. Metal Mind Productions (MMP) also released a limited edition box set of Live Eschaton: The Art of Rebellion in 2009 (limited to 2000 copies), which contains the concert on DVD with extras and a bonus CD containing the concert's audio.

== Track listing ==
=== Original VHS recording and CD reissue ===
Live performances
No.	Title	Lyrics	Music	Length
1.	"Decade of ΘΕΡΙΟΝ"	Krzysztof Azarewicz	Nergal	3:49
2.	"LAM"	Krzysztof Azarewicz	Nergal	4:09
3.	"Satan's Sword (I Have Become)"	Nergal	Nergal	4:42
4.	"From the Pagan Vastlands"	Tomasz Krajewski	Nergal	3:23
5.	"Driven by the Five-Winged Star"	Nergal	Nergal	5:23
6.	"The Entrance to the Spheres of Mars"	Nergal	Nergal	4:33
7.	"Starspawn"	Nergal	Nergal	3:19
8.	"Carnage" (Mayhem cover)			3:58
9.	"Chant for ΕΣΧΗΑΤΟΝ 2000"	Krzysztof Azarewicz	Nergal	6:30
10.	"Pure Evil & Hate"	Nergal	Nergal	4:42

Bonus video clips (VHS recording only)
No.	Title	Lyrics	Music	Length
1.	"Decade of ΘΕΡΙΟΝ"	Krzysztof Azarewicz	Nergal	3:19
2.	"Chant for ΕΣΧΗΑΤΟΝ 2000"	Krzysztof Azarewicz	Nergal	5:17

=== DVD reissues ===
The DVD reissues feature the band's discography at that time with album artwork and track listings, band and individual member biographies, an interview with Nergal, a slideshow of photos while the band is performing live, four exclusive wallpapers in Satanica artwork style (which are available in the "DESKTOP" folder located on the DVD), artwork from various demos, EPs and albums, stylistic variations of the band's logo, as well as details about the band's and their label's former websites. MMP retained the legal rights to re-release the original material in the future, which included their 2002 and 2009 DVD reissues. However, the band itself only lists the original VHS release in the official discography on their webpage due to the inclusion of unauthorized additional material in the DVD releases.

Live performances
No.	Title	Lyrics	Music	Length
1.	"Decade of ΘΕΡΙΟΝ"	Krzysztof Azarewicz	Nergal	3:49
2.	"LAM"	Krzysztof Azarewicz	Nergal	4:09
3.	"Satan's Sword (I Have Become)"	Nergal	Nergal	4:42
4.	"From the Pagan Vastlands"	Tomasz Krajewski	Nergal	3:23
5.	"Driven by the Five-Winged Star"	Nergal	Nergal	5:23
6.	"The Entrance to the Spheres of Mars"	Nergal	Nergal	4:33
7.	"Starspawn"	Nergal	Nergal	3:19
8.	"Carnage" (Mayhem cover)			3:58
9.	"Chant for ΕΣΧΗΑΤΟΝ 2000"	Krzysztof Azarewicz	Nergal	6:30
10.	"Pure Evil & Hate"	Nergal	Nergal	4:42

Bonus video clips
No.	Title	Lyrics	Music	Length
1.	"Decade of ΘΕΡΙΟΝ"	Krzysztof Azarewicz	Nergal	3:19
2.	"Chant for ΕΣΧΗΑΤΟΝ 2000"	Krzysztof Azarewicz	Nergal	5:17

Six rare audio tracks
No.	Title	Lyrics	Music	Length
1.	"Cursed Angel of Doom"	Nergal	Nergal	3:09
2.	"Dark Triumph"	Nergal, Baal	Nergal	5:24
3.	"Forgotten Empire of Dark Witchcraft"	Nergal	Nergal	4:11
4.	"Forgotten Cult of Aldaron"	Nergal	Nergal	4:35
5.	"Dragon's Lair (Cosmic Flames and Four Barbaric Seasons)"	Baal	Nergal	5:56
6.	"With Spell of Inferno"	Nergal	Nergal	4:39

== Personnel ==
Behemoth

- Adam "Nergal" Darski – guitars, vocals, lyrics
- Zbigniew Robert "Inferno" Promiński – drums and percussions
- Mateusz "Havok" Smierzchalski – guitars

Additional musicians

- Marcin "Novy" Nowak – bass guitar

Production

- Dariusz Kawka – photography
- Metal Hammer – photography
- Bart Kuęniak – audio mastering (5.1 Surround for the DVD)
- Piotr Brzeziński – sound mixing
- Bartosz Cichoński – camera
- Dariusz Posłuszny – camera
- Marcin Maron – camera
- Roman Piotrowski – camera
- Sebastian Molski – camera
- Wojciech Kursa – camera
- Artur Wojewoda – video editing
- Waldemar Szwajda – video editing
- Jeremi Grzywa – lighting supervising
- Fotis – lights
- Piotr Wolański – video mixing

== Release history ==
Region	Date	Label	Format
Poland	July 2000	Metal Mind Productions	VHS
Europe	28 May 2002	Metal Mind Productions	DVD
USA	18 June 2002	MVD Visual	DVD
Europe	20 April 2009	Metal Mind Productions	DVD + CD
USA	5 May 2009	MVD Visual	DVD + CD
