= Grom (album) =

Studio album by Behemoth
- Released: 2 January 1996
- Recorded: December 1995
- Genre: Black metal
- Length: 44:52
- Language: English, Polish
- Label: Solistitium
- Producer: Self-produced

Behemoth chronology
And the Forests Dream Eternally (1995)	Grom (1996)	Bewitching the Pomerania (1997)

Behemoth studio album chronology
Sventevith (Storming Near the Baltic) (1995)	Grom (1996)	Pandemonic Incantations (1998)

Grom (Polish for "Thunder") is the second studio album by Polish extreme metal band Behemoth. It was recorded and mixed from December 1995 to January 1996 and was originally released in January 1996 through Solistitium Records, and later by Pagan Records. The album is Behemoth's last release before their shift into a death metal sound.

== Critical reception ==
Professional ratings
Review scores
Source	Rating
AllMusic	4/5 stars
Chronicles of Chaos	10/10

AllMusic wrote of the album: "One of the most controversial and diverse albums in the band's career, the album is intriguing for several reasons: it not only featured keyboards and female vocals, but showed Behemoth's uniqueness from the start, with their novel combination of black, viking and thrash metal."

== Track listing ==
No.	Title	Lyrics	Music	Length
1.	"Intro" (instrumental)		Nergal	1:35
2.	"The Dark Forest (Cast Me Your Spell)"	Nergal	Nergal	7:06
3.	"Spellcraft and Heathendom"	Nergal	Nergal	4:50
4.	"Dragon's Lair (Cosmic Flames and Four Barbaric Seasons)"	Baal Ravenlock	Nergal	5:55
5.	"Lasy Pomorza"	Nergal	Nergal	6:25
6.	"Rising Proudly Towards the Sky"	Baal Ravenlock	Nergal	6:52
7.	"Thou Shalt Forever Win"	Nergal	Nergal	6:37
8.	"Grom"	Nergal	Nergal	5:27
Total length:				44:52

2023 reissue bonus tracks CD 2
No.	Title	Length
1.	"Freezing Moon"	6:06
2.	"Total Desaster"	4:37
3.	"Ostatni Tabor"	3:47
4.	"Rising Proudly Towards The Sky" (Rehearsal 1995)	5:22
5.	"Dragon's Lair" (Rehearsal 1995)	5:51
6.	"The Dark Forest" (Live In Maastricht, Pagan Triumph Tour 1996)	7:19
7.	"Spellcraft And Heathendom" (Live In Maastricht, Pagan Triumph Tour 1996)	3:05
8.	"Lasy Pomorza" (Live In Krakòw, XXX Years Ov Blasphemy 2021)	6:48

== Personnel ==
Behemoth

- Adam "Nergal" Darski – lead vocals, guitars and sleeve layout
- Adam "Baal Ravenlock" Muraszko – drums and backing vocals
- Leszek "Les" Dziegielewski – bass guitar

Additional musicians

- Piotr Weltrowski (December's Fire) – session synthesizers
- Celina – vocals

Production

- Krzysztof "Kris" Maszota – engineering
- DarkArts (David Thiérrée) – cover design and artwork
- Kreator – sleeve layout

Note

- Recorded and mixed during December 1995 & January 1996.

== Release history ==
Region	Date	Label
Germany, Brazil	2 January 1996	Solistitium Records, Hellion Records
Russia	1997	First Town Records
Poland	2002	Metal Mind Productions
