= Zos Kia Cultus (Here and Beyond) =

Studio album by Behemoth
- Released: 28th October 2002
- Recorded: June–September 2002; Hendrix Studios, Poland
- Genre: Blackened death metal
- Length: 44:58
- Label: Mystic, Avantgarde Music, Olympic/Century Media, Osmose
- Producer: Nergal

Behemoth chronology
Antichristian Phenomenon (2000)	Zos Kia Cultus (2002)	Conjuration (2003)

Behemoth studio album chronology
Thelema.6 (2000)	Zos Kia Cultus (Here and Beyond) (2002)	Demigod (2004)

Professional ratings
Review scores
Source	Rating
AllMusic	4.5/5 stars
Chronicles of Chaos	9/10 stars

Zos Kia Cultus is the sixth studio album by Polish extreme metal band Behemoth. It was recorded at the Hendrix Studios in June–September 2002 and mastered at the High End Studio in Warsaw in September 2002.

The title refers to Zos Kia Cultus, a form of magic developed by Austin Osman Spare. At the end of the track "Horns ov Baphomet", the person speaking is Aleister Crowley. It is from the track At Sea from the CD The Great Beast Speaks, which contains audio files from the only known recording of his voice.

The album was re-released through Peaceville Records as a limited edition digipak. It contained an enhanced audio disc with a video of As Above So Below included with the release.

== Track listing ==
No.	Title	Lyrics	Music	Length
1.	"Horns ov Baphomet"	Nergal	Nergal	6:37
2.	"Modern Iconoclasts"	Nergal	Nergal	4:28
3.	"Here and Beyond (Titanic Turn ov Time)"	Krzysztof Azarewicz	Nergal	3:26
4.	"As Above So Below"	Krzysztof Azarewicz	Nergal	5:01
5.	"Blackest ov the Black"	Nergal	Nergal	3:44
6.	"Hekau 718" (instrumental)	Krzysztof Azarewicz	Trotzky, Nergal	0:52
7.	"The Harlot ov the Saints"	Krzysztof Azarewicz	Nergal	2:48
8.	"No Sympathy for Fools"	Nergal	Nergal, Havok	3:49
9.	"Zos Kia Cultus"	Krzysztof Azarewicz	Nergal	5:32
10.	"Fornicatus Benefictus" (instrumental)	Austin Osman Spare	Raven Moonshae, Nergal	0:52
11.	"Typhonian Soul Zodiack"	Krzysztof Azarewicz	Nergal	4:30
12.	"Heru Ra Ha: Let There Be Might"	Nergal, Krzysztof Azarewicz	Nergal	3:03
Total length:				44:58

South Korean edition bonus tracks
No.	Title	Lyrics	Music	Length
13.	"Malice"	Nergal	Nergal	2:23
14.	"Sathanas" (Sarcófago cover)	Wagner Lamounier	Sarcófago	2:05
15.	"Hallo Spaceboy" (David Bowie cover)	David Bowie	David Bowie	3:26
16.	"From the Pagan Vastlands"	Tomasz Krajewski	Nergal	2:54
Total length:				55:46

== Personnel ==
Behemoth

- Adam "Nergal" Darski – lead, rhythm & acoustic guitars, vocals, mixing, lyrics
- Mateusz Maurycy "Havok" Śmierzchalski – lead and rhythm guitar
- Zbigniew Robert "Inferno" Promiński – drums and percussion

Additional musicians

- Marcin "Novy" Nowak – bass guitar
- Jerzy "U.Reck" Głód (Lux Occulta) – synthesizers
- Raven Moonshae – sound effects
- Piotr "Trozky" Weltrowski – sound effects

Production

- Krzysztof Azarewicz – all mantras and spells, lyrics
- Sharon E. Wennekers – grammatical and poetical consultation
- Arkadiusz "Malta" Malczewski – sound engineering, mixing
- Maurycy Śmierzchalski – photography
- Tomasz "Graal" Daniłowicz – cover design and artwork
- Grzegorz Piwkowski – audio mastering

Note

- Produced at Hendrix Studios, June–September 2002.
- Mastered at High End Studio, Warsaw, September 2002.

== Release history ==
Region	Date	Label
Poland, USA	22 October 2002	Mystic Production, Olympic Recordings/Century Media Records
Italy	28 October 2002	Avantgarde Music
Russia	December 2002	Irond Records
France	2002	Osmose Productions
South Korea	2003	Plyzen
