= Antichristian Phenomenon =

EP by Behemoth
- Released: December 2000
- Recorded: 1999–2000
- Genre: Blackened death metal
- Length: 21:31
- Label: Avantgarde Music
- Producer: Self-produced

Behemoth chronology
Thelema.6 (2000)	Antichristian Phenomenon (2000)	Zos Kia Cultus (Here and Beyond) (2002)

Professional ratings
Review scores
Source	Rating
Chronicles of Chaos	favorable

Antichristian Phenomenon is the third EP by Polish extreme metal band Behemoth. The first five tracks were recorded in July and August 2000 at the Hendrix Studios in Poland during the Thelema.6 studio session. "Day of Suffering" was recorded in November 2000, also in the Hendrix Studios. "Carnage" was recorded in April 1999 at the Starcraft Stimulation Studios.

A limited tour edition, which was packed in a black jewel case, was released during the European "Act of Rebellion" tour; 1000 copies exist of this edition. There was also a 7-inch picture disc released, which was limited to 500 copies, containing only three songs.

The EP also contains a multimedia track: a live video of the song "Christians To The Lions", featured on Thelema.6. It was filmed at Proxima Club in Warsaw, Poland, on 15 June 2001.

== Track listing ==
No.	Title	Lyrics	Music	Length
1.	"Antichristian Phenomenon"	Nergal	Nergal	4:37
2.	"Malice"	Nergal	Nergal	2:23
3.	"From the Pagan Vastlands 2000"	Tomasz Krajewski	Nergal	2:54
4.	"Sathanas" (Sarcófago cover)	Wagner Lamounier	Sarcófago	2:05
5.	"Hello Spaceboy" (David Bowie cover)	David Bowie	David Bowie	3:26
6.	"Day of Suffering" (Morbid Angel cover)	David Vincent	Trey Azagthoth	2:14
7.	"Carnage" (Mayhem cover)			4:03
Total length:				21:31

== Personnel ==
Behemoth

- Adam "Nergal" Darski – guitars, vocals, lyrics, mixing
- Zbigniew Robert "Inferno" Promiński – drums and percussions, mixing
- Mateusz "Havok" Smierzchalski – guitars (tracks 1–6)
- Leszek "Les Chaos" Dziegielewski – bass guitar (track 7)

Additional musicians

- Marcin "Novy" Nowak – bass guitar (on tracks 1–6)
- Maciej Niedzielski (Artrosis) – synthesizers
- Adam Sierżęga (Lost Soul) – drums on "Day Of Suffering"
- Łukasz "Bony" Luboń (Dvilyn) – guitars on "Day Of Suffering"

Production

- Sharon E. Wennekers – grammatical and poetical consultation
- Arkadiusz "Malta" Malczewski – sound engineering, mixing
- Grzegorz Piwkowski – audio mastering

Note

- Tracks 1 to 5 recorded during "Thelema.6" studio session, Hendrix Studios, July 2000.
- Track 6 recorded November 2000, Hendrix Studios.
- Track 7 recorded April 1999, Starcraft Stimulation Studios.
- Track Video filmed at Proxima Club, Warsaw, 15 June 2001.

== Release history ==
Region	Date	Label
Italy	December 2000	Avantgarde Music
