= Pandemonic Incantations =

Studio album by Behemoth
- Released: 2 March 1998
- Recorded: August–September 1997
- Genre: Blackened death metal
- Length: 37:30
- Language: English, Polish
- Label: Solistitium, Novum Vox Mortis/Koch International
- Producer: Behemoth

Behemoth chronology
Bewitching the Pomerania (1997)	Pandemonic Incantations (1998)	Satanica (1999)

Behemoth studio album chronology
Grom (1996)	Pandemonic Incantations (1998)	Satanica (1999)

Professional ratings
Review scores
Source	Rating
Chronicles of Chaos	7.5/10 stars

Pandemonic Incantations is the third studio album by Polish extreme metal band Behemoth. The album was recorded during August and September 1997, at Selani Studio and was mixed in October 1997. The album was then released in 1998 by Solistitium Records, whilst Behemoth were still in their period of transition from black metal to blackened death metal. A remastered digipak version was released by Metal Mind Records with six bonus tracks, including five live tracks recorded during the European tour in Toulouse, France, on 27 February 1999 and a studio version of With Spell of Inferno (Mefisto).

It is known that on the original version of the album, the eighth track is followed by 57 tracks of silence. The outro is on track number 66.

== Track listing ==
All tracks are written by Nergal, except where noted.

Regular CD
No.	Title	Length
1.	"Diableria (The Great Introduction)" (instrumental)	0:49
2.	"The Thousand Plagues I Witness"	5:15
3.	"Satan's Sword (I Have Become)"	4:17
4.	"In Thy Pandemæternum"	4:49
5.	"Driven by the Five-Winged Star"	5:03
6.	"The Past Is Like a Funeral"	6:40
7.	"The Entrance to the Spheres of Mars"	4:44
8.	"Chwała mordercom Wojciecha (997–1997 dziesięć wieków hańby)"	4:48
66.	"Outro"	0:59
Total length:		37:30

Remastered edition
No.	Title	Lyrics	Length
1.	"Diableria (The Great Introduction)"		0:49
2.	"The Thousand Plagues I Witness"		5:15
3.	"Satan's Sword (I Have Become)"		4:17
4.	"In Thy Pandemaeternum"		4:49
5.	"Driven by the Five-Winged Star"		5:03
6.	"The Past is Like a Funeral"		6:40
7.	"The Entrance to the Spheres of Mars"		4:44
8.	"With Spell of Inferno (Mefisto)" (Bonus track)		4:38
9.	"Chwała Mordercom Wojciecha (997-1997 Dziesięć Wieków Hańby)"		4:48
10.	"Diableria (The Great Introduction)" (Bonus track, live)		0:29
11.	"The Thousand Plagues I Witness" (Bonus track, live)		5:23
12.	"Satan's Sword (I Have Become)" (Bonus track, live)		4:35
13.	"From the Pagan Vastlands" (Bonus track, live)	Tomasz Krajewski	3:40
14.	"Driven by the Five-Winged Star" (Bonus track, live)		5:08

2025 Metal Blade Records reissue bonus tracks CD 2
No.	Title	Length
1.	"With Spell Of Inferno (Mefisto)"	4:39
2.	"Hidden In A Fog" (1997 version)	5:13
3.	"Sventevith (Storming Near The Baltic)" (1997 version)	5:17
4.	"The Thovsand Plagves I Witness" (Rough mix)	5:22
5.	"Satan's Sword (I Have Become)" (Rough mix)	4:23
6.	"The Entrance To The Spheres Of Mars" (Rough mix)	4:55
7.	"Driven By The Five-Winged Star" (Rough mix)	5:09

== Personnel ==
Behemoth

- Adam "Nergal" Darski – vocals, guitars, acoustic guitar, bass guitar, lyrics
- Mefisto – bass guitar (credit only)
- Zbigniew Robert "Inferno" Promiński – drums, percussion

Additional musicians

- Piotr Weltowski (December's Fire) – synthesizers

Production

- Starprint – photography
- Jacek Gawlowski – mixing
- Tomasz "Graal" Daniłowicz – cover design and artwork, logo
- Marqvis – logo
- Andrzej "Andy" Bomba – engineering

Note

- Recorded during August/September 1997 at Selani Studio. Mixed in October 1997.

== Release history ==
Region	Date	Label
Germany, Poland	2 March 1998	Solistitium Records, Novum Vox Mortis
Italy	1999	Avantgarde Music
