= Sventevith (Storming Near the Baltic) =

Studio album by Behemoth
- Released: 3 April 1995
- Recorded: December 1994
- Genre: Black metal
- Length: 45:28
- Label: Pagan
- Producer: Behemoth

Behemoth chronology
...From the Pagan Vastlands (1994)	Sventevith (Storming Near the Baltic) (1995)	And the Forests Dream Eternally (1995)

Behemoth studio album chronology
Sventevith (Storming Near the Baltic) (1995)	Grom (1996)

Professional ratings
Review scores
Source	Rating
AllMusic	3/5 stars

Sventevith (Storming Near the Baltic) is the debut studio album by Polish extreme metal band Behemoth. It was released in April 1995 by Pagan Records. It has since been re-released through numerous other labels.

== Artwork and design ==
The cover art was created by French artist David Thiérrée (credited as DarkArts), depicting the Polabian Slavic deity Svetovit. The interior booklet incorporates a woodcut illustration entitled The Temple of Swarog (depicting the Slavic temple of Radogoszcz / Swarożyc) by Polish artist Stanisław Jakubowski from his 1923 portfolio Prasłowiańskie motywy architektoniczne.

== Track listing ==
All music is composed by Nergal, except "Ancient" and "Hell Dwells in Ice" which were written and performed by Swiss zine writer Demonius.

No.	Title	Lyrics	Length
1.	"Chant of the Eastern Lands"	Nergal	5:43
2.	"The Touch of Nya" (instrumental)	–	0:57
3.	"From the Pagan Vastlands"	Tomasz Krajewski	4:30
4.	"Hidden in a Fog"	Tomasz Krajewski	6:49
5.	"Ancient" (instrumental)	–	2:01
6.	"Entering the Faustian Soul"	Nergal	5:35
7.	"Forgotten Cult of Aldaron"	Nergal	4:35
8.	"Wolves Guard My Coffin"	Nergal	4:29
9.	"Hell Dwells in Ice"	Demonious	5:50
10.	"Transylvanian Forest" (originally on the And the Forests Dream Eternally EP)	Nergal	4:53
Total length:			45:28

Reissue bonus track
No.	Title	Length
11.	"Sventevith (Storming Near the Baltic)" (originally on the And the Forests Dream Eternally EP)	5:59
Total length:		51:17

2021 reissue bonus tracks CD 2
No.	Title	Length
1.	"Cursed Angel of Doom" (Sventevith bonus track)	3:11
2.	"Dark Triumph" (Sventevith bonus track)	4:50
3.	"Bless Thee for Granting Me Pain" (Helevorn, 1994)	2:20
4.	"Hell Dwells in Ice" (Helevorn, 1994)	3:04
5.	"Hidden in a Fog" (Merry Christless 15 December 2017, Warsaw, Poland)	5:04
6.	"From the Pagan Vastlands" (Black Metal Inferno Fest 8 June 1996, Rotterdam, Netherlands)	4:59
7.	"Hidden in a Fog" (Black Metal Inferno Fest 8 June 1996, Rotterdam, Netherlands)	5:47
8.	"Wolves Guard My Coffin" (Black Metal Inferno Fest 8 June 1996, Rotterdam, Netherlands)	5:00
9.	"Hidden in a Fog" (Live at Riviera Remont 11 October 1996, Warsaw, Poland)	4:57
10.	"From the Pagan Vastlands" (Pagan Triumph Tour 14 September 1996, Maastricht, Netherlands)	3:54
11.	"Hidden in a Fog" (Pagan Triumph Tour 14 September 1996, Maastricht, Netherlands)	5:43
Total length:		51:17

Note: The 2021 reissue has only the first nine songs on CD 1.

== Personnel ==
Behemoth

- Adam "Nergal" Darski – vocals, guitars, bass, mixing
- Adam "Baal Ravenlock" Muraszko – drums, mixing

Additional musicians

- Cezary "Cezar" Augustynowicz (Christ Agony) – keyboards
- Sascha "Demonius" Falquet – keyboards & songwriting (tracks 5, 9)

Production

- DarkArts (David Thiérrée) – cover design and artwork
- Tomasz Daniłowicz – cover concept and layout
- Krzysztof Maszota – engineering
- Tomasz Krajewski – executive producer, lyrics

Note

- Recorded in December 1994 at Eight Studio.

== Release history ==
Region	Date	Label
Germany, Poland, Brazil	3 April 1995	Last Epitaph, Pagan Records, Hellion Records
Russia	2005	CD-Maximum
