= Sventevith =

Sventevith can refer to:

- Svetovid, a god in Slavic mythology
- Sventevith (Storming Near the Baltic), an album recorded by Behemoth
