= Satanica (album) =

Studio album by Behemoth
- Released: 9 August 1999
- Recorded: 1999, Starcraft Stimulation Studios
- Genre: Blackened death metal
- Length: 37:44
- Label: Avantgarde, Metal Mind, Dwell
- Producer: Nergal, M.A.

Behemoth chronology
Pandemonic Incantations (1998)	Satanica (1999)	Live Eschaton (2000)

Behemoth studio album chronology
Pandemonic Incantations (1998)	Satanica (1999)	Thelema.6 (2000)

Professional ratings
Review scores
Source	Rating
Chronicles of Chaos	9/10 stars
Collector's Guide to Heavy Metal	8/10
Teraz Rock	3.5/5 stars

Satanica is the fourth studio album by Polish extreme metal band Behemoth, released in 1999. Much of the music in this release is death metal with influences of black metal music, also commonly known as blackened death metal. It was recorded at the Starcraft Stimulation Studios and mastered in Warsaw, Poland in 1999.

== Track listing ==
Regular CD and digipak

No.	Title	Lyrics	Music	Length
1.	"Decade of Therion"	Krzysztof Azarewicz	Nergal	3:19
2.	"LAM"	Krzysztof Azarewicz	Nergal	4:13
3.	"Ceremony of Shiva"	Krzysztof Azarewicz	Nergal	3:32
4.	"Of Sephirotic Transformation and Carnality"	Krzysztof Azarewicz	Nergal	4:30
5.	"The Sermon to the Hypocrites"	Krzysztof Azarewicz	Nergal	5:03
6.	"Starspawn"	Nergal	Nergal	3:31
7.	"The Alchemist's Dream"	Krzysztof Azarewicz	Nergal	5:40
8.	"Chant for Eschaton 2000"	Krzysztof Azarewicz	Nergal	5:22
33.	"#33"	–	Nergal	0:57
93.	"#93"	Nergal	Nergal	1:37
Total length:				37:44

Double CD edition (bonus disc)

It is known that a limited edition double CD was released. The jewel case contains a second bonus CD with live tracks from Strasbourg, France, 26 February 1999.

No.	Title	Lyrics	Music	Length
1.	"Diableria (The Great Introduction)"	Nergal	Nergal	0:44
2.	"The Thousand Plagues I Witness"	Nergal	Nergal	5:26
3.	"Satan's Sword (I Have Become)"	Nergal	Nergal	4:48
4.	"From the Pagan Vastlands"	Tomasz Krajewski	Nergal	3:30
5.	"Driven by the Five-Winged Star"	Nergal	Nergal	5:34
6.	"The Entrance to the Spheres of Mars"	Nergal	Nergal	4:41
Total length:				24:43

Notes

- On some copies, track 1 is entitled as "Decade of ΘΕΡΙΟΝ" (ΘΕΡΙΟΝ is Greek for Therion).
- On some copies, track 8 is entitled as "Chant for ΕΣΧHΑΤΟΝ 2000" (ΕΣΧHΑΤΟΝ is Greek for Eschaton).
- It is known that this album was released with 2 hidden tracks. The first hidden track #33 is an instrumental track, while #93 is a short non-instrumental track but containing lyrics which are nowhere to be found. The tracks 9–32, as well as tracks 34–92 are silent/blank tracks, lasting 0:04 each.

== Personnel ==
Behemoth

- Adam "Nergal" Darski – guitars, bass guitar, vocals, synthesizers, lyrics, mixing
- Zbigniew Robert "Inferno" Promiński – drums and percussions
- Leszek "L-Kaos" Dziegielewski – guitar

Production

- Krzysztof Azarewicz – lyrics
- Katarzyna Brejwo – grammatical consultation
- Tomasz "Graal" Daniłowicz – cover design and artwork
- Marquis – logo
- Agnieszka Gafka – photography
- M.A. – co-producing, co-mixing
- Grzegorz Piwkowski – audio mastering

Note

- Recorded at Starcraft Stimulation Studios. Mastered in Warsaw, 1999.

== Release history ==
Region	Date	Label
Poland	9 August 1999	Metal Mind Productions
Italy, UK	25 October 1999	Avantgarde Music, Peaceville Records
USA	22 August 2000	Dwell Records
Russia	February 2002	Irond Records
