= Bewitching the Pomerania =

EP by Behemoth
- Released: 19 September 1997
- Recorded: February 1997
- Genre: Blackened death metal
- Length: 15:10
- Label: Vox Mortiis, Solistitium
- Producer: Behemoth

Behemoth chronology
Grom (1996)	Bewitching the Pomerania (1997)	Pandemonic Incantations (1998)

Professional ratings
Review scores
Source	Rating
Chronicles of Chaos	9/10 stars

Bewitching the Pomerania is the second EP by Polish extreme metal band Behemoth. It was released in 1997 by Solistitium Records. It was recorded at P.J. Studios in February 1997 and mastered at Vox Mortiis Studio. The EP is the first release of the band to feature Zbigniew Robert "Inferno" Promiński on drums. Bewitching the Pomerania also marks the band's passage from black metal music to a style more similar to death metal. All three tracks were included on the 2005 re-release of Behemoth's debut EP, And the Forests Dream Eternally.

On Behemoth's official webpage Nergal stated that the artwork for Bewitching the Pomerania is "by far the worst Behemoth artwork of all time". It is also the first release to showcase Behemoth's new logo from the Old English text to its present form.

== Track listing ==
No.	Title	Lyrics	Music	Length
1.	"With Spell of Inferno (Mefisto)"	Nergal	Nergal	4:39
2.	"Hidden in the Fog" (Re-recording)	Tomasz Krajewski	Nergal	5:13
3.	"Sventevith (Storming Near the Baltic)" (Re-recording)	Nergal	Nergal	5:18
Total length:				15:10

== Personnel ==
Behemoth

- Adam "Nergal" Darski – guitars, vocals, lyrics, mixing
- Leszek "Les" Dziegielewski – bass guitar
- Zbigniew Robert "Inferno" Promiński – drums and percussion, mixing

Additional musicians

- Piotr Weltrowski (December's Fire) – session synthesizers

Production

- Robert Hajduk – engineering, mixing
- Tomasz Krajewski – lyrics

Note

- Recorded at P.J. Studios, February '97.
- Mastered at Vox Mortiis Studio.

== Release history ==
Region	Date	Label
Poland, Germany	19 September 1997	Vox Mortiis Records, Solistitium Records
