= Thelema.6 =

Studio album by Behemoth
- Released: 27 November 2000
- Recorded: July–August 2000; Hendrix Studios, Poland
- Genre: Blackened death metal
- Length: 41:12
- Label: Mystic, Avantgarde Music, Olympic/Century Media, Irond, Osmose
- Producer: Nergal

Behemoth chronology
Live Eschaton (2000)	Thelema.6 (2000)	Antichristian Phenomenon (2000)

Behemoth studio album chronology
Satanica (1999)	Thelema.6 (2000)	Zos Kia Cultus (Here and Beyond) (2002)

Professional ratings
Review scores
Source	Rating
AllMusic	4/5 stars
Chronicles of Chaos	9/10
Teraz Rock	4/5 stars

Thelema.6 is the fifth studio album by Polish extreme metal band Behemoth. The album was recorded and mixed at the Hendrix Studios in Poland in July and August 2000 and was then mastered at the High-End Studio in Warsaw in 2000.

The album was re-released in 2000 as a limited digipak edition that was limited to only 1,000 copies. An enhanced audio disc with a video for the song Christians to the Lions was included with the release.

== Track listing ==
Standard edition
No.	Title	Lyrics	Music	Length
1.	"Antichristian Phenomenon"	Nergal	Nergal	4:41
2.	"The Act of Rebellion"	Nergal	Nergal	3:49
3.	"Inflamed with Rage"	Nergal	Nergal	3:14
4.	"ΠΑΝ ΣΑΤΥΡΟΣ"	Krzysztof Azarewicz	Nergal	4:25
5.	"Natural Born Philosopher"	Nergal	Nergal	4:00
6.	"Christians to the Lions"	Nergal	Nergal	3:03
7.	"Inauguration of Scorpio Dome"	Krzysztof Azarewicz	Nergal, Havoc	3:07
8.	"In the Garden of Dispersion"	Krzysztof Azarewicz	Nergal, Havoc	3:23
9.	"The Universe Illumination (Say 'Hello' to My Demons)"	Nergal	Nergal	3:33
10.	"VINVM SABBATI"	Krzysztof Azarewicz	Nergal	3:26
11.	"23 (The Youth Manifesto)"	Nergal	Nergal	4:01
12.	"The End"	Nergal	Nergal	0:30
Total length:				41:12

The limited edition was released which was limited to 1,000 copies and omits the track The End and replaces it with 11 blank tracks. Tracks 12–22 are silent tracks, lasting 4 seconds each.

Limited edition digipak track listing
No.	Title	Lyrics	Music	Length
1.	"Antichristian Phenomenon"	Nergal	Nergal	4:41
2.	"The Act of Rebellion"	Nergal	Nergal	3:49
3.	"Inflamed with Rage"	Nergal	Nergal	3:14
4.	"ΠΑΝ ΣΑΤΥΡΟΣ"	Krzysztof Azarewicz	Nergal	4:25
5.	"Natural Born Philosopher"	Nergal	Nergal	4:00
6.	"Christians to the Lions"	Nergal	Nergal	3:03
7.	"Inauguration of Scorpio Dome"	Krzysztof Azarewicz	Nergal	3:07
8.	"In the Garden of Dispersion"	Krzysztof Azarewicz	Nergal	3:23
9.	"The Universe Illumination (Say 'Hello' to My Demons)"	Nergal	Nergal	3:33
10.	"VINVM SABBATI"	Krzysztof Azarewicz	Nergal	3:26
11.	"23 (The Youth Manifesto)"	Nergal	Nergal	4:01
12.	"Malice"	Nergal	Nergal	2:24
13.	"Sathanas" (Sarcófago cover)	Wagner Lamounier	Sarcófago	2:07
14.	"Hallo Spaceboy" (David Bowie cover)	David Bowie	David Bowie	3:27
15.	"From the Pagan Vastlands"	Tomasz Krajewski	Nergal	3:08

== Personnel ==
Behemoth

- Adam "Nergal" Darski – guitars, acoustic guitar, all vocals, lyrics, mixing
- Zbigniew Robert "Inferno" Promiński – drums and percussions, mixing
- Mateusz "Havoc" Śmierzchalski – guitars

Additional musicians

- Marcin "Novy" Nowak – bass guitar
- Maciej Niedzielski (Artrosis) – synthesizers
- Łukasz "Mr. Jashackh" Jaszak – editing, samples

Production

- Krzysztof Azarewicz – lyrics
- Sharon E. Wennekers – grammatical and poetical consultation
- Arkadiusz "Malta" Malczewski – sound engineering, mixing
- Grzegorz Piwkowski – audio mastering
- Tomasz "Graal" Daniłowicz – cover design and artwork
- Dominik Kulaszewicz – photography
- Krzysztof Sadowski – photography

Note

- Recorded and mixed at Hendrix Studios, Poland, July–August 2000.
- Mastered at High-End Studio, Warsaw, 2000.

== Release history ==
Region	Date	Label
Poland, UK, Italy, France	27 November 2000	Mystic Production, Peaceville Records, Avantgarde Music, Osmose Productions
Russia	January 2001	Irond Records
US	12 June 2001	Olympic Recordings/Century Media Records

== Charts ==
Chart (2000)	Peak position
Polish Albums Chart	31
