= And the Forests Dream Eternally =

EP by Behemoth
- Released: August 1995
- Recorded: July 1994
- Genre: Black metal
- Length: 24:50
- Label: Enthopy
- Producer: Behemoth, Luca Marchetti, Massimo Origgi

Behemoth chronology
Sventevith (Storming Near the Baltic) (1995)	And the Forests Dream Eternally (1995)	Grom (1996)

Professional ratings
Review scores
Source	Rating
AllMusic	3.5/5 stars

And the Forests Dream Eternally is the debut EP by Polish extreme metal band Behemoth. It was released in August 1995 through Italian label Enthopy Records.

The EP was recorded in July 1994 in Warrior Studio.

"Pure Evil and Hate" is a tribute to Bathory. It is one of the band's most popular songs and is often a closer for live performances.

The EP was re-released in 1997 by Last Episode Records in a split with Forbidden Spaces by Polish black metal band Damnation. It was re-issued again in 2005, with the tracks from another Behemoth EP, Bewitching the Pomerania, as bonus tracks. On 18 September 2020 the EP was re-released again, by Metal Blade Records. This re-issue included nine bonus tracks and came in different coloured vinyl and double CD format.

== Track listing ==
No.	Title	Length
1.	"Transylvanian Forest"	5:34
2.	"Moonspell Rites"	6:00
3.	"Sventevith (Storming Near the Baltic)"	5:58
4.	"Pure Evil and Hate"	3:07
5.	"Forgotten Empire of Dark Witchcraft"	4:11
Total length:		24:50

Reissue bonus tracks
No.	Title	Length
6.	"With Spell of Inferno (Mefisto)"	4:38
7.	"Hidden in the Fog"	5:12
8.	"Sventevith Storming Near the Baltic (Version 97)"	5:15
Total length:		39:55

2020 reissue bonus tracks CD 2
No.	Title	Length
1.	"Transylvanian Forest (Merry Christless Festival 2017, Poland)"	4:51
2.	"Moonspell Rites (Loud Park Festival 2013, Japan)"	7:11
3.	"Pure Evil and Hate (Brutal Assault Festival, 2000, Czech Republic)"	3:23
4.	"Transylvanian Forest (Pagan Triumph Tour 1996, Netherlands)"	4:26
5.	"Transylvanian Forest (Riviera Remont Club 1996, Poland)"	4:19
6.	"Sventevith (Storming Near the Baltic) (Rehearsal 1994)"	6:19
7.	"Moonspell Rites (1993 Rehearsal)"	6:52
8.	"Pure Evil and Hate (1993 Rehearsal)"	3:14
9.	"Moonspell Rites (1993 Rehearsal)"	7:09

== Personnel ==
Behemoth

- Adam "Nergal" Darski – vocals, guitar, bass guitar and drums (track 5)
- Adam "Baal Ravenlock" Muraszko – drums and percussion
- Rafał "Frost" Brauer – guitar

Production

- Krzysztof "Kris" Maszota – engineering
- Luca Marchetti – executive producer
- Massimo Origgi – executive producer

Note

- Recorded at Warrior Studio, Gdańsk, Poland, July 1994

== Charts ==
Chart performance for And the Forests Dream Eternally
Chart (2020)	Peak position
German Albums (Offizielle Top 100)	78

== Release history ==
Region	Date	Label
Italy	August 1994	Entropy Productions
Brazil, Poland	2005	Hellion Records, Metal Mind Records
