= Impressions in Blood =

- Cover art by Seth Siro Anton

Studio album by Vader
- Released: 23 August 2006
- Recorded: 2006, Hertz Studio, Białystok, Poland
- Genre: Death metal
- Length: 37:15
- Label: Regain, Mystic, Candlelight, Avalon Marquee
- Producer: Wojtek & Sławek Wiesławscy

Vader chronology
The Art of War (2005)	Impressions in Blood (2006)	XXV (2008)

Alternative cover
- special edition cover art

Professional ratings
Review scores
Source	Rating
About.com	4.5/5 stars
AllMusic	3.5/5 stars
Blabbermouth	8/10 stars
Chronicles of Chaos	8/10 stars
Teraz Rock	4/5 stars

Impressions in Blood is the seventh studio album by Polish death metal band Vader. It was released on 23 August 2006 in Japan by Avalon Marquee with a bonus cover of "Raining Blood" by Slayer. In Poland, the album was released on 1 September 2006 via Mystic Production. The album was nominated for a Fryderyk Award in the category 'Rock/Metal Album of the Year (Album roku rock/ metal)'.

Impressions in Blood was recorded between April and June 2006 at Hertz Studio in Białystok, Poland, and was produced by the Wiesławscy Brothers. The album features cover art by Septicflesh bassist Seth Siro Anton. Dariusz "Daray" Brzozowski described the work on the album, saying:

The band entered the studio on 24th of [April]. First two days we spent on preparing everything, soundcheck and so on. Then I started recording my drum tracks which all in all took me 10 days... It's going to be the fastest album I've ever recorded, you will hear there a lot of blastbeats and fast double pedal drumming. This time for the recording I used OSCA 5B drumsticks, TAMA Starclassic drumkit with Ludwig 'Black Beauty' snare drum, Alchemy Professional cymbals, Aquarian Response II pads on toms and Hi-Energy on snare, Roland RT-7K triggers, D-DRUM module and finally, my current favourite thing — AXIS X-Longboards pedals which helped me to achieve a staggering level of speed.

A music video was shot for the song "Helleluyah!!! (God Is Dead)", which was directed by Andrzej Wyrozębski. Janusz Król was responsible for special effects and the set design for the video, while Sławomir Panasewicz was the cameraman. In Poland, Impressions in Blood landed at position No. 8, and dropped out five weeks later. The album also charted in Japan.

== Track listing ==
No.	Title	Lyrics	Music	Length
1.	"Between Day and Night" (instrumental)		Krzysztof Oloś	0:41
2.	"ShadowFear"	Harry Maat	Piotr Wiwczarek	4:50
3.	"As Heavens Collide..."	Harry Maat	Maurycy Stefanowicz	2:41
4.	"Helleluyah!!! (God Is Dead)"	Piotr Wiwczarek	Piotr Wiwczarek	3:02
5.	"Field of Heads"	Harry Maat	Piotr Wiwczarek	4:06
6.	"Predator"	Paweł Frelik	Piotr Wiwczarek	5:12
7.	"Warlords"	Harry Maat	Maurycy Stefanowicz	2:43
8.	"Red Code"	Paweł Frelik	Piotr Wiwczarek	2:30
9.	"Amongst the Ruins"	Harry Maat	Maurycy Stefanowicz	4:07
10.	"They Live!!!"	Paweł Frelik	Piotr Wiwczarek	2:13
11.	"The Book"	Paweł Frelik	Maurycy Stefanowicz	5:07
Total length:				37:15

Japanese edition bonus track
No.	Title	Lyrics	Music	Length
11.	"Raining Blood" (Slayer cover)	Jeff Hanneman, Kerry King	Jeff Hanneman	3:40

Special edition disc 2
No.	Title	Lyrics	Music	Length
1.	"Lead Us!!!"	Maurycy Stefanowicz	Piotr Wiwczarek	3:19
2.	"The Book"	Paweł Frelik	Maurycy Stefanowicz	5:07
3.	"Die!!! (Gin Psie)"	Piotr Wiwczarek	Piotr Wiwczarek	2:55
4.	"Raining Blood" (Slayer cover)	Jeff Hanneman, Kerry King	Jeff Hanneman	3:38
5.	"This is the War" (videoclip)	Piotr Wiwczarek	Piotr Wiwczarek	2:54
6.	"Helleluyah!!! (God Is Dead)" (videoclip)	Piotr Wiwczarek	Piotr Wiwczarek	3:03
7.	"Sword of the Witcher" (videoclip)	Piotr Wiwczarek	Piotr Wiwczarek	3:38

== Personnel ==
Production and performance credits are adapted from the album liner notes.

Vader

- Piotr "Peter" Wiwczarek – lead vocals, rhythm guitar, lead guitar, bass guitar, lyrics
- Maurycy "Mauser" Stefanowicz – rhythm guitar, lead guitar
- Marcin "Novy" Nowak – bass guitar (credited, did not perform)
- Dariusz "Daray" Brzozowski – drums

Additional musicians

- Krzysztof "Siegmar" Oloś – guest keyboards

Production

- Wojtek & Sławek Wiesławscy – production, sound engineering, mixing, mastering
- Tomasz Lewandowski – photos
- Harry Maat – lyrics
- Paweł Frelik – lyrics
- Seth Siro Anton – cover art, layout
- Seiichi Miyasaka – Japanese liner notes

Note

- Recorded, mixed, mastered at Hertz Studio, Bialystok, April–May 2006

== Charts ==
Chart (2006)	Peak position
Polish Albums Chart	8
Japanese Albums Chart	265

== Release history ==
Region	Date	Label
Japan	23 August 2006	Avalon Marquee
Poland	1 September 2006	Mystic Production
Europe	4 September 2006	Regain Records
USA	5 September 2006	Candlelight Records
