= Dies Irae (band) =

Polish death metal band

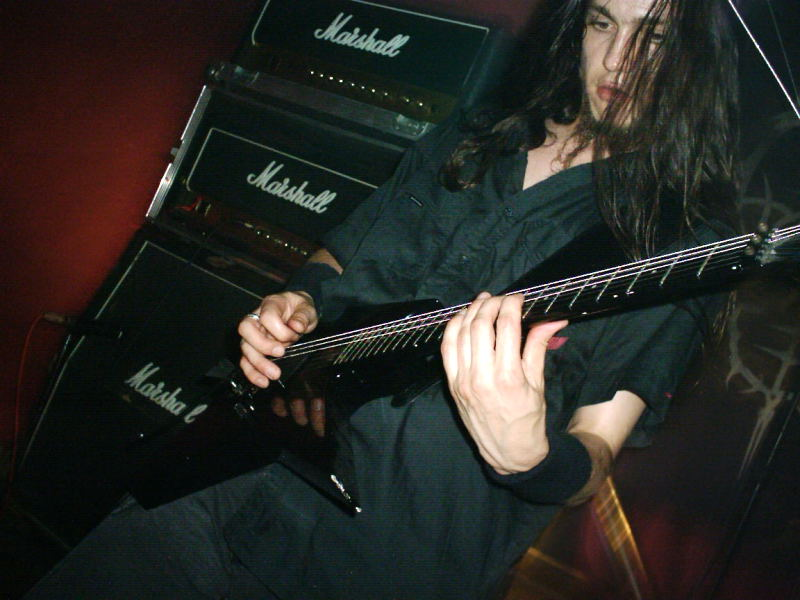
- Mauser, 2004

Background information
- Origin: Olsztyn, Poland
- Genre: Death metal
- Years active: 1992–1997, 2000–2005
- Labels: Metal Blade, Metal Mind
- Past members: Maurycy "Mauser" Stefanowicz; Marcin "Novy" Nowak; Jacek Hiro; Krzysztof "Doc" Raczkowski (deceased); Jarosław "China" Łabieniec; Piotr "Czarny" Bartczak; Witold "Vitek" Kieltyka (deceased); Maciej "Gilan" Liszewski

Dies Irae was a Polish death metal band founded in 1992. Vader and Morbid Angel inspired and influenced their early recordings.

Since 2005, the band is on indefinite hiatus.

== Biography ==
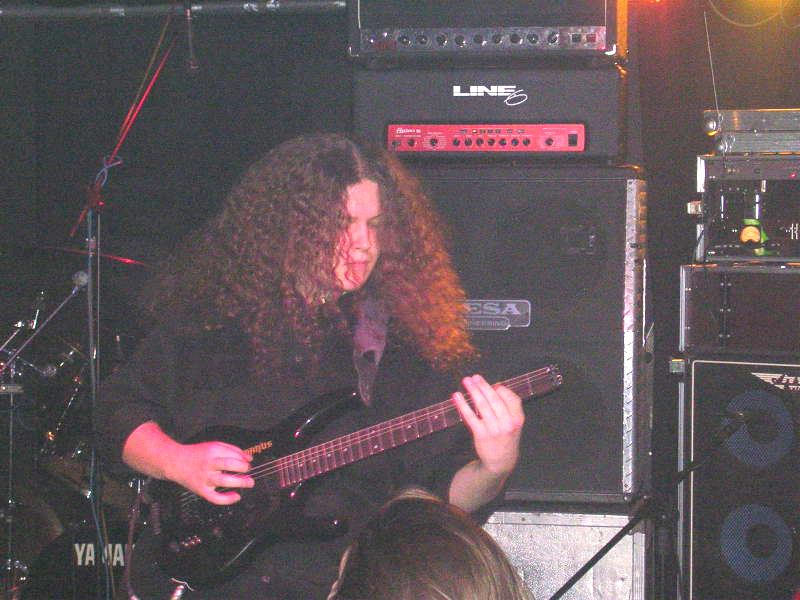
Hiro, 2005

Dies Irae was formed in 1992 as a death metal band featuring China (guitar), Mauser (guitar and vocals), Czarny (bass) and Gilan (drums). In 1994, they recorded their debut demo, Fear of God, released by Serenades Records two years later. The demo was composed of typical death metal tracks and guitar variations as introductions. In 1997, Mauser joined Vader and Dies Irae split up. Four years later, Mauser signed a contract with Massive Management, whose artist roster consists of such bands as Vader, Sceptic, Decapitated and many others, and started looking for new band members. With help from Doc (Vader), Novy (Devilyn) and Hiro (Sceptic), the band prepared material for a full debut album.

On 5 June 2000, Dies Irae entered the Selani Studio to record their debut album. Titled Immolated, it was produced by Szymon Czech, and graphically designed by Jacek Wisniewski, who was responsible for several of Vader's cover artworks ("Kingdom", "Black to the Blind", " Live In Japan"). Immolated was mastered at Studio 333 by Bartłomiej Kuźniak, who is responsible for Vader's masters. Łukasz Szurmiński wrote all lyrics.

Following the promotional mailing of Immolated, the band received a number of offers from labels from Europe and the United States. Dies Irae signed a four-album contract with Metal Blade Records, which represents the band around the world except Poland and Japan. In Poland, they are under Metal Mind. In Japan, Avalon/Marquee Inc. represents them. Both labels manage Vader. The debut album was released in November 2000, and its promo campaign was backed up with a video-clip for the track "Lion of Knowledge". The album comprises nine cuts, including two cyber-industrial intros performed by Doc. Dies Irae prepared their first European tour with Nile in January 2001.

On April/May 2002, the band entered Hertz Studio to record their second full-length album, The Sin War. The release date was rescheduled to September because of technical problems with the CD-Masters. The album contains more complex and diverse songs, with all band members contributing to the final result. The band postponed the autumn tour due to Vader's obligations.

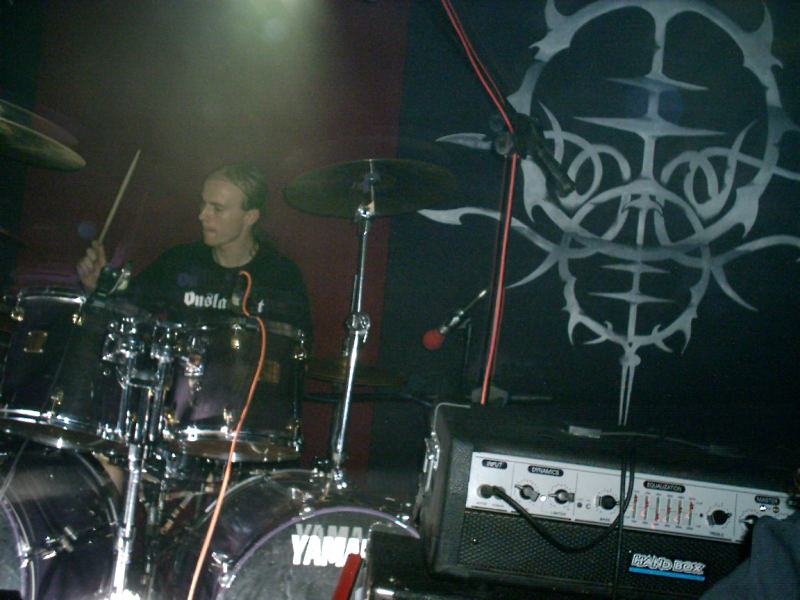
Vitek, 2004

In July 2003, Dies Irae appeared on stage for the first time. During the "Empire Invasion Tour 2004", they played with bands like Hate, Lost Soul and Esqarial. The deal with Metal Blade ended and the band signed a new deal with MMP, including new album and DVD releases. The third and latest effort, Sculpture of Stone, was recorded at Hertz Studio and includes nine songs. The album was released in Poland on 19 May 2004 and the band toured again, playing nine shows with bands like Trauma, Sceptic, Shadows Land. Vitek from Decapitated replaced Doc, due to his hand injury. Japanese, European and US releases of Sculpture of Stone were fixed in autumn 2004. At the beginning of 2005, Dies Irae filmed a show for the forthcoming DVD release, and in February, they toured with bands like Decapitated, Hate and Crionics in "The Ultimate Domination Tour 2005".

In 2009, the band released a DVD/CD, The Art of an Endless Creation, including live footage, the band's most successful album, Sculpture of Stone, and bootleg recordings. The release was partly a tribute to late drummer "Doc", who died suddenly in 2005. All members of the reconstituted Dies Irae continue to perform with other groups. Novy is a member of Nader Sadek, Mauser is playing in UnSun, while Hiro is a member of Sceptic.

== Band members ==
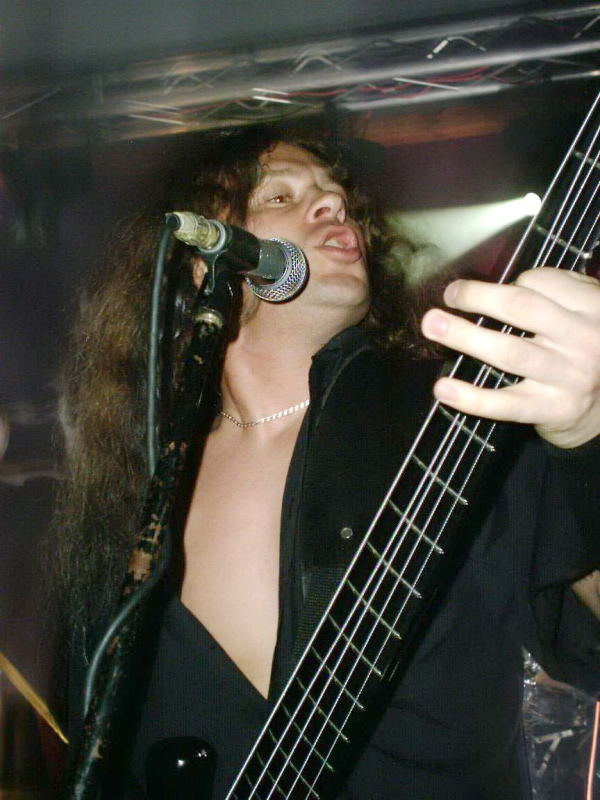
Novy, 2004

Last known line-up

- Maurycy "Mauser" Stefanowicz – vocals, guitar (1992–1997, 2000–2005)
- Marcin "Novy" Nowak – vocals, bass (2000–2005)
- Jacek Hiro – guitar (2000–2005)
- Krzysztof "Doc" Raczkowski (died 2005) – drums (2000–2005)

Former members

- Jarosław "China" Łabieniec – guitar (1994–1997)
- Piotr "Czarny" Bartczak – bass (1992–1997)
- Maciej "Gilan" Liszewski – drums (1992–1997)

Touring members

- Witold "Vitek" Kieltyka (died 2007) – drums (2004)

== Discography ==
Year	Title	Label
1994	Fear of God	Self-released
2000	Immolated	Metal Blade Records
2002	The Sin War	Metal Blade Records
2004	Sculpture of Stone	Metal Mind Productions
2009	The Art of an Endless Creation (DVD)	Metal Mind Productions
