= Mateusz Śmierzchalski =

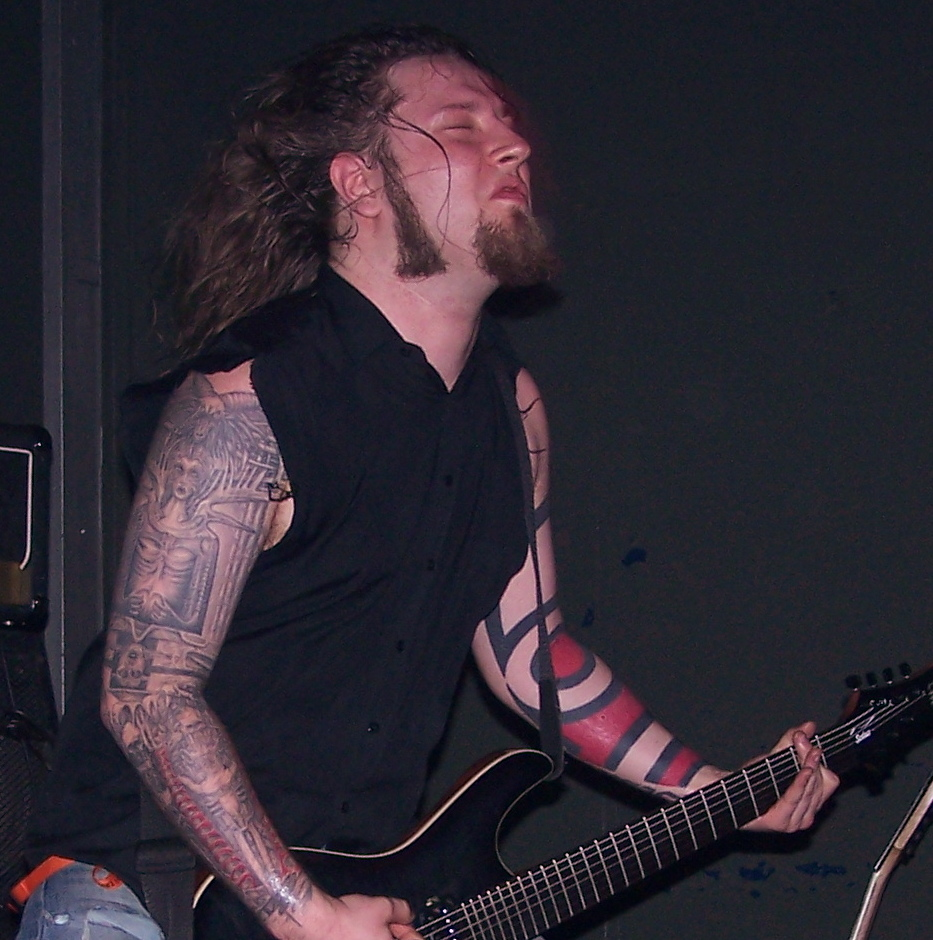
- Mateusz Śmierzchalski, 2006

Background information
- Also known as: Havoc
- Born: Mateusz Maurycy Śmierzchalski; 18 July 1982 (age 43); Gdynia, Poland
- Genres: Blackened death metal; death metal; black metal; sludge metal; doom metal
- Occupations: Musician; songwriter
- Instruments: Guitar; vocals

Mateusz Maurycy Śmierzchalski (born 18 July 1982, Gdynia, Poland), stage name Havoc, is a Polish heavy metal musician. He is best known for being the former rhythm guitarist for Behemoth. Since 1999, he is lead guitarist of the sludge-doom metal band Blindead.

Mateusz Śmierzchalski is endorsed by Mayones.

== Discography ==
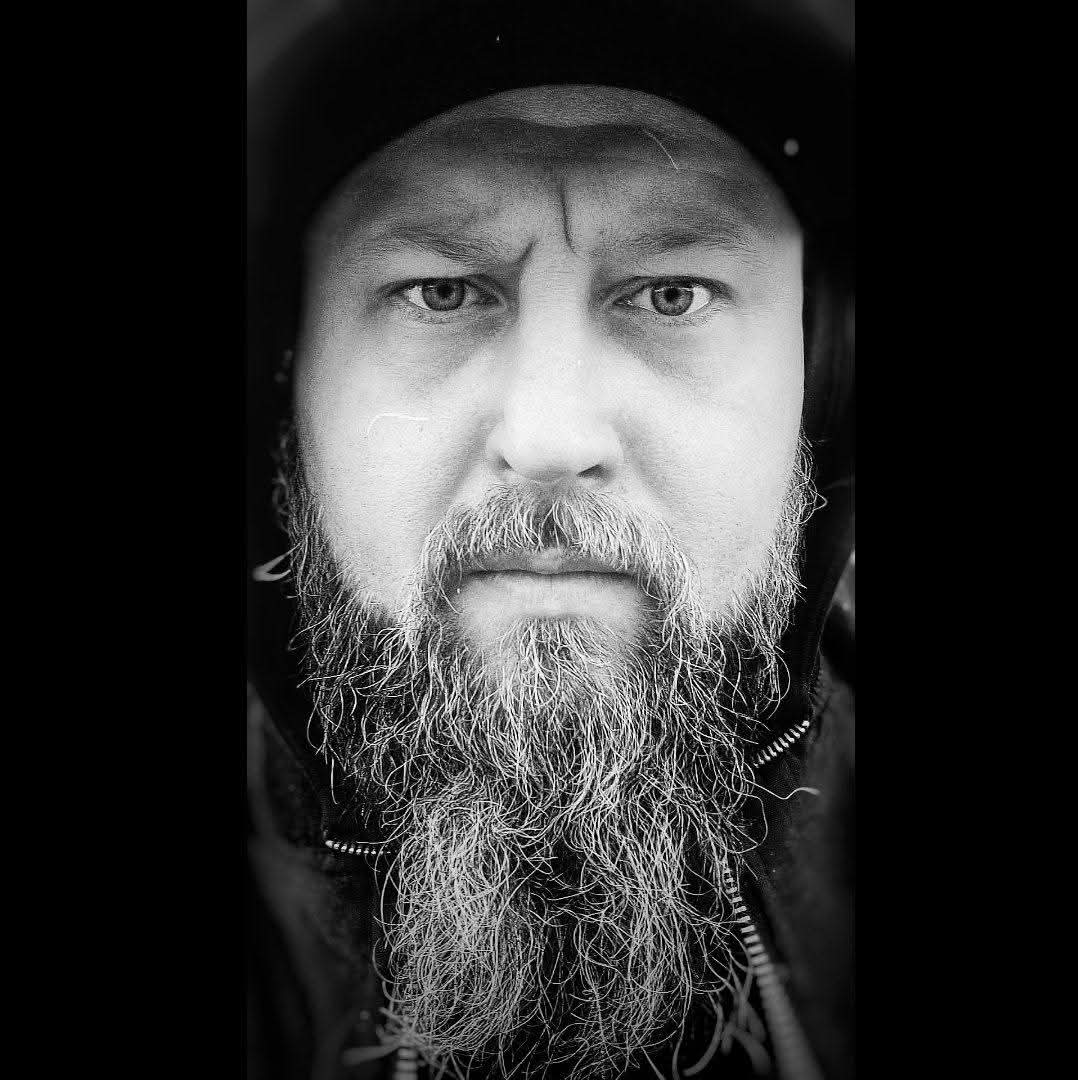
Śmierzchalski in 2024

=== Behemoth ===
- Live Eschaton (2000, VHS, Metal Mind Records)
- Thelema.6 (2000, Avantgarde Music)
- Antichristian Phenomenon (2000, Avantgarde Music)
- Zos Kia Cultus (2002, Avantgarde Music)
- Conjuration (2003, Regain Records)
- Crush.Fukk.Create: Requiem for Generation Armageddon (2004, DVD, Regain Records)
- Abyssus Abyssum Invocat (2011, Peaceville Records)

=== Seagulls Insane and Swans Deceased Mining Out the Void ===
- Seagulls Insane and Swans Deceased Mining Out the Void (2011, Witching Hour Productions)
