= Immolated =

Studio album by Dies Irae
- Released: October 4, 2000 (US), December 16, 2000 (JPN)
- Recorded: June, 2000, Selani Studio, Olsztyn, Poland
- Genre: Death metal
- Length: 31:57
- Label: Metal Blade Records (US), Metal Mind Productions (POL), Avalon Marquee (JPN), Фоно (RUS)
- Producer: Szymon Czech

Dies Irae chronology
Fear of God (1994)	Immolated (2000)	The Sin War (2002)

Professional ratings
Review scores
Source	Rating
Metal Reviews	78/100

Immolated is the first album by the Polish death metal band Dies Irae released in 2000 by Metal Blade Records. A video was filmed for the track "Lion Of Knowledge".

== Track listing ==
No.	Title	Lyrics	Music	Length
1.	"Zohak"	Łukasz Szurmiński	Maurycy Stefanowicz, Krzysztof Raczkowski	3:41
2.	"Message Of Aiwaz"	Łukasz Szurmiński	Maurycy Stefanowicz	2:53
3.	"Sirius B"	Łukasz Szurmiński	Maurycy Stefanowicz	5:03
4.	"Immolated"	Łukasz Szurmiński	Maurycy Stefanowicz	2:16
5.	"The Nameless City"	Łukasz Szurmiński	Maurycy Stefanowicz, Krzysztof Raczkowski	3:39
6.	"Bestride Shantak"	Łukasz Szurmiński	Maurycy Stefanowicz	2:40
7.	"Turning Point"	Łukasz Szurmiński	Maurycy Stefanowicz	2:18
8.	"Hidden Lore"	Łukasz Szurmiński	Maurycy Stefanowicz	4:03
9.	"Lion Of Knowledge"	Łukasz Szurmiński	Maurycy Stefanowicz	7:55
Total length:				31:57

== Credits ==
- Marcin "Novy" Nowak - bass, vocals
- Maurycy "Mauser" Stefanowicz - guitars
- Jacek Hiro - guitars
- Krzysztof "Doc" Raczkowski - drums
- Szymon Czech - sound engineering, producer
- Bartłomiej Kuźniak - mastering
- Jacek Wiśniewski - cover art, layout
- Mariusz Kmiołek - photography
