= Sculpture of Stone =

Studio album by Dies Irae
- Released: 28 May 2004 (POL)
- Recorded: December, 2003, Hertz Studio, Białystok, Poland
- Genre: Death metal
- Length: 39:19
- Label: Metal Mind Productions (POL), Avalon Marquee (JPN), CD-Maximum (RUS)
- Producer: Sławomir Wiesławski, Wojciech Wiesławski, Dies Irae

Dies Irae chronology
The Sin War (2002)	Sculpture of Stone (2004)

Professional ratings
Review scores
Source	Rating
Exclaim!	favorable

Sculpture of Stone is the third album on a major record label by the Polish death metal band Dies Irae released in 2004.

== Track listing ==
No.	Title	Lyrics	Music	Length
1.	"Beyond All Dimensions"	Nowak	Stefanowicz, Raczkowski, Nowak, Hiro	4:19
2.	"The Hunger"	Hiro	Stefanowicz, Raczkowski, Nowak, Hiro	3:38
3.	"Unrevealed by Words"	Nowak	Stefanowicz, Raczkowski, Nowak, Hiro	3:58
4.	"The Art of an Endless Creation"	Nowak	Stefanowicz, Raczkowski, Nowak, Hiro	3:40
5.	"Trapped in the Emptiness"	Nowak	Stefanowicz, Raczkowski, Nowak, Hiro	4:15
6.	"The Plague"	Nowak	Stefanowicz, Raczkowski, Nowak, Hiro	3:17
7.	"The Oceans of Filth"	Nowak	Stefanowicz, Raczkowski, Nowak, Hiro	4:20
8.	"The Beginning of Sin"	Nowak	Stefanowicz, Raczkowski, Nowak, Hiro	6:19
9.	"Sculpture of Stone"	Nowak	Stefanowicz, Raczkowski, Nowak, Hiro	5:33
Total length:				39:19

== Credits ==
- Marcin "Novy" Nowak - bass, vocals
- Maurycy "Mauser" Stefanowicz - guitars
- Jacek Hiro - guitars
- Krzysztof "Doc" Raczkowski - drums
- Jacek Wiśniewski - cover art, layout
- Sławomir Wiesławski, Wojciech Wiesławski - sound engineering, producer, mixing
- Mariusz Kmiołek - photography
