= The Sin War =

Studio album by Dies Irae
- Released: 24 September 2002 (US), 23 September 2002 (POL),
- Recorded: May–June, 2002, Hertz Studio, Białystok, Poland
- Genre: Death metal
- Length: 39:58
- Label: Metal Blade Records (US), Metal Mind Productions (POL), Avalon Marquee (JPN), Фоно (RUS)
- Producer: Sławomir Wiesławski, Wojciech Wiesławski, Maurycy "Mauser" Stefanowicz

Dies Irae chronology
Immolated (2000)	The Sin War (2002)	Sculpture of Stone (2004)

Professional ratings
Review scores
Source	Rating
Brave Words	7.5/10
Metal.de	6/10
Metal Reviews	80/100

The Sin War is the second album on a major record label by the Polish death metal band Dies Irae released in 2002.

== Track listing ==
1. "Comrade of Death" – 2:40
2. "Incarnation of Evil" – 3:22
3. "Internal War" – 4:59
4. "Horde of Angry Deamons" – 4:16
5. "Infinity" – 3:05
6. "Genocide Generation" – 2:42
7. "The Truth" – 3:32
8. "Beyond Sensual" – 4:58
9. "Another Being Wasted" – 4:29
10. "Nine Angels" – 5:55

== Credits ==
- Marcin "Novy" Nowak - bass, vocals
- Maurycy "Mauser" Stefanowicz - guitars, music
- Jacek Hiro - guitars, music, lyrics
- Krzysztof "Doc" Raczkowski - drums
- Jacek Wiśniewski - cover art, layout
- Sławomir Wiesławski, Wojciech Wiesławski - sound engineering, producer, mixing
- Łukasz Szurmiński - lyrics
- Mariusz Kmiołek - management
