= The Art of War (EP) =

- Cover art by Arkadiusz Jurcan

EP by Vader
- Released: 14 November 2005
- Recorded: Early 2005, Hertz Studio, Białystok, Poland
- Genre: Death metal
- Length: 14:31
- Language: English, Polish
- Label: Regain, Mystic, Candlelight, Avalon Marquee
- Producer: Wojtek & Sławek Wiesławscy

Vader chronology
The Beast (2004)	The Art of War (2005)	Impressions in Blood (2006)

Professional ratings
Review scores
Source	Rating
About.com	4/5 stars
AllMusic	3.5/5 stars
Blabbermouth.net	8/10 stars
Chronicles of Chaos	8/10 stars

The Art of War is an EP by the Polish death metal band Vader. It was released on 14 November 2005 by Regain Records in Europe, and Mystic Production in Poland. Japanese edition was released on 23 November 2005 by Avalon Marquee, and contains bonus track "Die!!!! (Giń Psie)".

The Art of War was recorded in early 2005 at Hertz Studio in Białystok, Poland produced by Wojtek & Sławek Wiesławscy. Photo session was made by Krzysztof "Sado" Sadowski, and it took place at Błędów Desert in Poland. A music video was shot for the song "This Is the War" which was produced and directed by Arkadiusz Jurcan. Screenshots from video have been used as cover art, and layout. The EP is the first Vader release that features guitarist Maurycy "Mauser" Stefanowicz as composer.

Tracks "Para Bellum" and "Banners on the Wind" are intros created by Krzysztof "Siegmar" Oloś from the symphonic black metal band Vesania. It is dedicated to a former drummer of Vader, Krzysztof "Docent" Raczkowski, who died approximately three months before this EP's release.

== Track listing ==
No.	Title	Lyrics	Music	Length
1.	"Para Bellum" (instrumental)		Krzysztof Oloś	1:26
2.	"This Is the War"	Piotr Wiwczarek	Piotr Wiwczarek	2:49
3.	"Lead Us!!!"	Piotr Wiwczarek	Maurycy Stefanowicz	3:16
4.	"Banners on the Wind" (instrumental)		Krzysztof Oloś	0:49
5.	"What Colour Is Your Blood?"	Piotr Wiwczarek	Piotr Wiwczarek	3:58
6.	"Death in Silence"	Piotr Wiwczarek	Piotr Wiwczarek	2:12
7.	"This Is the War" (CD-ROM bonus video clip)	Piotr Wiwczarek	Piotr Wiwczarek	2:54
8.	"This Is the War (War Mix)" (CD-ROM bonus video clip)	Piotr Wiwczarek	Piotr Wiwczarek	2:54
Total length:				14:31

Japanese Bonus Track
No.	Title	Lyrics	Music	Length
6.	"Die!!!! (Giń Psie)"	Piotr Wiwczarek	Piotr Wiwczarek	2:53

== Personnel ==
Production and performance credits are adapted from the album liner notes.

Vader

- Piotr "Peter" Wiwczarek − lead vocals, rhythm guitar, lead guitar, bass guitar
- Maurycy "Mauser" Stefanowicz − rhythm guitar, lead guitar
- Marcin "Novy" Nowak − bass guitar (credited, did not perform)
- Darek "Daray" Brzozowski − drums

Additional musicians

- Krzysztof "Siegmar" Oloś – keyboards

Production

- Wojtek & Sławek Wiesławscy − sound engineering, mixing, mastering
- Krzysztof "Sado" Sadowski − band photography
- Arkadiusz Jurcan − cover art, screens
- Jacek Wiśniewski − design
- Massive Management − management

Note

- Recorded, mixed and mastered at Hertz Studio, Białystok, June 2005.

== Release history ==
Region	Date	Label
Europe/Poland	14 November 2005	Regain Records/Mystic Production
Japan	23 November 2005	Avalon Marquee
USA	24 January 2006	Candlelight Records
