= The Beast (album) =

- Cover art by Jacek Wiśniewski

Studio album by Vader
- Released: 8 September 2004
- Recorded: RG Studio, Gdańsk, May–June 2004
- Genre: Death metal
- Length: 37:48
- Labels: Metal Mind, Metal Blade
- Producer: Piotr Wiwczarek

Vader chronology
Blood (2003)	The Beast (2004)	The Art of War (2005)

Singles from The Beast
- 1. "Beware the Beast" Released: 24 August 2004

Professional ratings
Review scores
Source	Rating
Chronicles of Chaos	7/10 stars
Teraz Rock	4/5 stars
Exclaim!	favorable

The Beast is the sixth album by the Polish death metal band Vader. It was released on 8 September 2004 in Japan by Marquee/Avalon, 20 September in Poland via Metal Mind Productions, and a day later in Europe and the United States by Metal Blade Records.

The album's working title was Spiritual Disease. The release was preceded by the single "Beware the Beast", which was released on 25 August 2004. The album was nominated for a Fryderyk Award in the category 'Metal Album of the Year (Album roku metal)'. Two music videos have been made for the songs "Dark Transmission" and "Choices", which were directed by Wojciech Głodek. Video clips were shot at RG Studio while recording the album. In Poland, The Beast landed at position No. 8, and dropped out five weeks later. The album also charted in Japan.

The album was recorded between May and June 2004 at RG Studio in Gdańsk, Poland, and was produced by Piotr Wiwczarek. The album was mastered by Jacek Gawłowski at JG Lab Studio in Warsaw, Poland. Originally, drum sessions took place at Hertz Studio in Białystok in February 2004 with drummer Krzysztof "Doc" Raczkowski, however, Raczkowski fell down a flight of stairs, causing arm and leg injuries. Because of the accident, the studio sessions was postponed. Ultimately, the band decided to hire Vesania drummer Dariusz "Daray" Brzozowski as a session musician. Piotr "Peter" Wiwczarek talked about the accident while working on the album, saying:

[...]factor that was pretty important was The Beast was the first album without Doc drumming on it. Believe me, if Doc had been on the record (and he was supposed to be, as we had started recording it when he fell and broke his hand, basically because he was drunk, which was one of the reasons we decided he had to quit the band), it wouldn't have been such a big drama around it. First, I tried to make The Beast more melodic compared to the previous one, Revelations. And then we had a new guy (Daray) replacing one [of] the most important persons in the band (Doc), who created Vader and its songs since the beginning.

== Track listing ==
No.	Title	Lyrics	Music	Length
1.	"Intro" (instrumental)		Piotr Wiwczarek	0:59
2.	"Out of the Deep"	Piotr Wiwczarek	Piotr Wiwczarek	4:51
3.	"Dark Transmission"	Paweł Frelik	Piotr Wiwczarek	4:09
4.	"Firebringer"	Piotr Wiwczarek	Piotr Wiwczarek	3:32
5.	"The Sea Came in at Last"	Paweł Frelik	Piotr Wiwczarek	4:05
6.	"I Shall Prevail"	Paweł Frelik	Piotr Wiwczarek	3:49
7.	"The Zone"	Paweł Frelik	Piotr Wiwczarek	4:30
8.	"Insomnia"	Paweł Frelik	Piotr Wiwczarek	3:27
9.	"Apopheniac"	Paweł Frelik	Piotr Wiwczarek	4:13
10.	"Choices"	Łukasz Szurmiński	Piotr Wiwczarek	4:07
Total length:				37:48

Japanese Bonus Track
No.	Title	Lyrics	Music	Length
11.	"Stranger in the Mirror"	Łukasz Szurmiński	Piotr Wiwczarek	2:41

Special edition DVD/CD
No.	Title	Lyrics	Music	Length
1.	"Studio Report" (video)			24:13
2.	"Dark Transmission" (videoclip)	Paweł Frelik	Piotr Wiwczarek	3:52
3.	"Choices" (videoclip)	Łukasz Szurmiński	Piotr Wiwczarek	2:45
4.	"Epitaph" (Live at Metalmania 2003)	Łukasz Szurmiński	Piotr Wiwczarek	3:57
5.	"Wings" (Live at Metalmania 2003)	Paweł Frelik	Piotr Wiwczarek	4:26
6.	"The Nomad" (Live at Metalmania 2003)	Paweł Frelik	Piotr Wiwczarek	4:14

== Personnel ==
Production and performance credits are adapted from the album liner notes.

Vader

- Piotr "Peter" Wiwczarek – lead vocals, rhythm guitar, lead guitar, bass guitar, mixing, production, lyrics
- Maurycy "Mauser" Stefanowicz – lead guitar
- Marcin "Novy" Nowak – bass guitar (credited, did not perform)
- Dariusz "Daray" Brzozowski – session drums (credited as band member)

Production

- Paweł Frelik – lyrics
- Łukasz Szurmiński – lyrics
- Piotr Łukaszewski – sound engineering, mixing
- Grzegorz Smoloński – photos
- Jacek Gawłowski – mastering
- Bartłomiej Kuźniak – mastering (single)
- Jacek Wiśniewski – cover art
- Wojtek Głodek – studio report

Note

- Recorded & mixed at RG Studio, Gdańsk, May/June 2004
- Mastered at JG Lab Studio, Warszawa, July 2004
- Studio report & video-clips filmed at RG Studio, Gdańsk
- Live video-clips filmed during Metalmania Festival 2003, Katowice, Poland.

== Beware the Beast ==
"Beware the Beast" is the fifth single by the Polish death metal band Vader. It was released only in Poland on 24 August 2004 by Empire Records. The release features two songs "Dark Transmission (333.version)", "Stranger in the Mirror", studio report, and music video for "Dark Transmission".

The studio report consists walk through the main recording process of The Beast album, interview with band members, and studio engineer Piotr Łukaszewski. Marcin "Novy" Nowak despite being shown in video did not record any off bass lines which were handled by Piotr "Peter" Wiwczarek.

=== Track listing ===
No.	Title	Lyrics	Music	Length
1.	"Dark Transmission (333.version)"	Paweł Frelik	Piotr Wiwczarek	3:54
2.	"Stranger in the Mirror"	Łukasz Szurmiński	Piotr Wiwczarek	2:40
3.	"Studio Report" (video)			24:13
4.	"Dark Transmission" (music video)			3:52

== Charts ==
=== Weekly ===
Chart (2004)	Peak position
Polish Albums Chart	8
Japanese Albums Chart	207

=== Monthly ===
Chart (2004)	Peak position
Poland (ZPAV Top 100)	15

== Release history ==
Formats	Region	Date	Label
CD	Japan	8 September 2004	Avalon Marquee
CD, 2CD	Poland	20 September 2004	Metal Mind Productions
CD, CD+DVD, LP	USA/Europe	21 September 2004	Metal Blade Records
