= Marcin Nowak (musician) =

Polish death metal musician (born 1975)

Marcin "Novy" Nowak
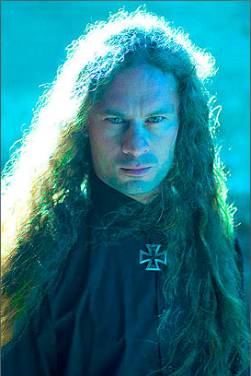
- Marcin "Novy" Nowak

Background information
- Also known as: Novy
- Born: 17 October 1975 (age 50)
- Origin: Tarnów, Poland
- Genres: Death metal; thrash metal
- Occupations: Musician; songwriter
- Instruments: Bass; guitar; vocals
- Years active: 1992–present
- Labels: Regain; Mystic Production
- Website: www.novy-bass.com

Marcin "Novy" Nowak (born April 4, 1975) is a Polish musician, composer, the author of texts, vocalist and instrumentalist. Marcin Nowak is known primarily as a bass guitarist, popularity brought him performances in Behemoth and Vader, as well as Devilyn and Dies Irae, in which he also served as a vocalist and the author of the texts. Nowak also cooperated with such music groups as: Nader Sadek, Spinal Cord, Against the Plagues, Condemnation, Thy Disease, Crucified Mortals; and musicians of the metal scene including Derek Roddy, Steve Tucker (Morbid Angel), Run (Mayhem), Flo Mounier (Cryptopsy), Glen Benton (Deicide), Jack Owen (Cannibal Corpse), Richie Brown (ex Trivium). Since 2010, he creates own project under the name Road's End.

== Biography ==
Novy started artistic activity in 1992 in band Cerebral Concussion from Tarnów (Poland) founded with the guitarist Łukasz Luboń. In 1996, a formation having a demo cassette entitled "The Rule" (1994) changed name to Devilyn.

In 1996, Novy together with the band signs a contract for two albums and released the debut album entitled "Anger", which was released by the French music label Listenable Records. The next Devilyn's album "Reborn in Pain" was released in 1998. Support on the list of Listenable Records, as well as many concerts have adopted the popularity band on the death metal music scene. In 1999, Novy joined as a bass guitarist to polish black metal band Behemoth. In 2000, he recorded with the Behemoth album "Thelema.6". Also in 2000, Novy took part in the reactivation of the Maurician "Mauser" Stefanowicz's band - Dies Irae. The effect of cooperation was the album "Immolated"(2000).

In 2001 released the third and last album of Devilyn with Novy in lineup called "Artefact". A year later, he recorded another album with the Behemoth entitled "Zos Kia Cultus (Here and Beyond)". Also in 2002, the second album of Dies Irae "The Sin War" was released. In 2003, musician leaves the Devilyn as a result of misunderstandings with Łukasz Luboń. Also in 2003, Marcin Nowak accepted the offer of Piotr Wiwczarek and joined the Vader, thus finishing cooperation with the Adam Darski's band - Behemoth.

In 2004, he joined the thrash-death metal band SPINAL CORD and together with the band, recorded the album released the same year "Stigmata of Life". In the same year, with the American band Crucified Mortals recorded a miniCD "Converted by Decapitation" and the third and the last album in discography of Dies Irae - "Sculpture of Stone". In 2004, another album of the Vader "The Beast" with Novy is released. Bass guitarist also occupied in promotional music videos to "Dark Transmission" and "Choices". In the following years Vader registered the concert CD's "Night of the Apocalypse" (2005) and "... And Blood was shed in Warsaw" (2007) with Novy. Another publication with Novy is an EP "The Art of War" 2005 and a full time CD "Impressions in Blood" from 2006, and the great success of the group recording a song to computer game "The Witcher" along with promotional video - "Sword of the Witcher".

The last CD of VADER with Novy was released in 2008 and entitled "XXV". The musician recorded only part of the bass guitar tracks for this album. According to the leader of the band Piotr Wiwczarek, the style of Nowak was a breakneck and inadequate. That same year, in the atmosphere of scandal Novy left the band.

Then he briefly joined thrash metal band - Virgin Snatch. Together with them, he gave a range of concerts in Poland, and then left the line-up in 2009. In the meantime, he played on the CD of Condemnation - "Abyssies of Anguish" (2009). In 2010, Nowak appointed the proprietary project under the name Road's End and signed a contract with the American management in Arizona Desert Core represented by Michael Ignena. He also guest appeared on the album of the Ukrainian band Semargl - "Ordo Bellictum Satanas". In 2011, joined to the industrial death metal band Thy Disease and black-death metal band of Wawrzyn "Varyen" Chyliński - Against The Plagues. Also in 2011, he completed the concert line-up of the Nader Sadek band. He also performed as guest musician on the Albuos of Orthodox - "Forever Not Yet" and Hexfire - "The Fire of Redemption". In 2015, he finally ends and publishes the album Road's End entitled "Last Life Memories".

The musician changes the existing felting to death metal, this time presenting on the part of more melodic and commercial metal tracks. Novy specifies this change as ".. European Soul With American Style". In 2017, for a short time, the first line-up of the band in Chicago and released the official single "The Descent". The Road's End will get nominations for Chicago Music Award and occupies the first place in the Rock-Metal Debut category.

== Equipment ==
For a considerable period of his artistic activity, Marcin Nowak played on custom-made bass guitars of the Polish producer - Malinek. These were: a four-string guitar with a body inspired by models of the American manufacture Hammer based on active EMG humbuckers and a five-string instrument with a body inspired by the Warwick Status model also with EMG pickups. This guitar was stolen from a musician in 2006 during the Vader band's stay in Turkey. In 2004, Nowak briefly joined the Mayones company, which supplied the musician with the five-string bass guitar Victorious 5. Then he played the five-string Music Man BONGO model. In 2006, luthier from Wrocław (PL), Piotr Kamecki, prepared the signature five-string guitar by Nowak, P. Kamecki Custom Novy Signature. After leaving Vader, he re-established cooperation with the Malinek manufacture, transformed into the Malwood company. The company made a guitar named Malwood N 6 according to the musician's design. The musician also uses the Eden WT1205 amplifier, Eden D410XST and Eden D115XLT loudspeakers and strings Ernie Ball Nickiel Wound .045-.130(PO2836).

== Discography ==
Road's End

- Last Liefe Memories (CD, 2015)
- The Descent (single, 2017)

Behemoth

- Thelema.6 (2000)
- Antichristian Phenomenon (EP, 2000)
- Zos Kia Cultus (Here and Beyond) (2002)
- Conjuration (EP, 2003)
- Crush.Fukk.Create: Requiem for Generation Armageddon (DVD, 2004)

Cerebral Concussion

- The Rule (1994)

Condemnation

- Abyssies of Anguish (2009)

Crucified Mortals

- Converted By Decapitation (EP, 2004)

Devilyn

- Anger (CD, 1996)
- Reborn in Pain (CD, 1998)
- Artefact (CD, 2001)

Dies Irae

- Immolated (CD, 2000)
- The Sin War (CD, 2002)
- Sculpture of Stone (CD, 2004)

Spinal Cord

- Stigmata Of Life (CD, 2004)
- Night Stalker (promo, 2012)

Vader

- Blood (EP, 2003)
- The Beast (CD, 2004)
- Night of the Apocalypse (DVD, 2004)
- The Art of War (EP, 2005)
- Impressions In Blood (CD, 2006)
- And Blood Was Shed in Warsaw (DVD, 2007)
- XXV (2008)

Cryptic Tales

- Dogmata of Mercy (CD, 2011)
