= Demon Energy =

Energy drink

Demon Energy is an energy drink produced in New Zealand by Davies Foods. It is sold in 250 ml aluminium cans, 500 ml aluminium cans, 600 ml, 1 litre, and 1.5 litre plastic bottles. During 2009, Demon Energy released 60 ml energy shots. These are made to be drunk at room temperature and can thus be stored anywhere. Demon Energy can be purchased in 10-unit packs.

Variations include Demon Killa Tropo, consisting of 40% Demon Energy and 60% orange juice, Demon Killa Cola, which is Demon Energy mixed with Cola, and a sugar-free version. In late 2016 Demon Energy released Hell Fire.

In February 2009 the company was found to have breached advertising standards by the Advertising Standards Authority for using sexual appeal to sell its product.

In May 2009 the company released an "Energy Shot" containing 200 mg of caffeine, or twice as much as the average flat white. The release sparked an investigation into caffeine levels in energy drinks by the New Zealand Food Safety Authority. An investigation by the New Zealand Herald found that the drink's caffeine levels were more than ten times the legal limit. In August 2009 a 15-year-old girl collapsed after drinking several of the company's "Energy Shots", leading to calls for the drinks to carry mandatory warning labels. The safety of energy drinks was subsequently referred to Food Standards Australia New Zealand.

In September 2009 a group of New Zealand soldiers were sent home from Afghanistan after photographing themselves posing with a bomb carrying an advertisement for Demon and sending the photograph to the company. The company denied they had organised the stunt, but admitted supplying free drinks and posters to the soldiers.

In May 2012, the drink was introduced in Poland following a license of the brand by Agros Nova. The advertising campaign involved Adam Darski and was controversial.
