= David Thiérrée =

French artist (born 1970)

David Thiérrée is a French artist born in 1970 in La Rochelle (France). Self-taught, he has contributed since 1989 - 1990 to create images and logos for several metal bands, first for his own band Somberness, then for other bands, labels and fanzines worldwide, including Behemoth, Mutiilation, Vlad Tepes, Osculum Infame, The Ancients Rebirth, Graveland, Warloghe, Malleus Maleficarum, and Anwyl. His works can also be seen on several materials from bands such as Gorgoroth, Mortiis, and Gehenna, or linked to the promotion of other bands, like Strid, and Enslaved. Since 2000, he has been more focused on classic Fantasy illustration, and recently came back to artwork for metal bands. His works have been shown in several exhibitions (France, Belgium, England), and several books are available, in collaboration with Edouard Brasey, Le Pré aux Clercs, Les Moutons électriques, Spootnik éditions, including an artbook, out in May 2011. In 2017 a large and dedicated artbook entitled 'Owls, Trolls & Dead King's Skulls: The Art Of David Thiérrée' was published by UK publishing house Cult Never Dies
