= Nergal (musician) =

Polish musician

Adam Darski
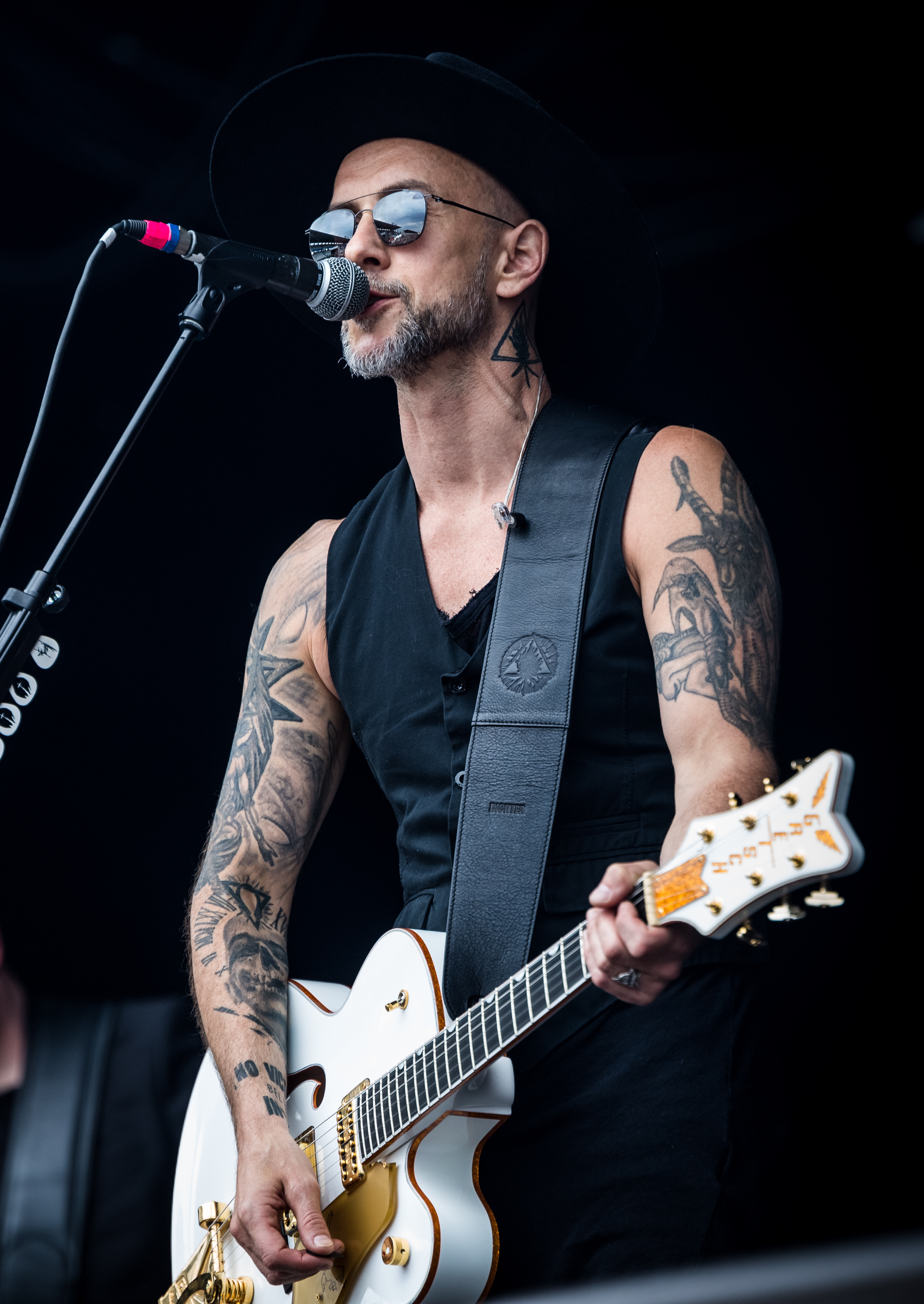
- Darski performing at Rock am Ring 2017

Background information
- Also known as: Nergal; Holocausto; Howlin' De Ville
- Born: Adam Michał Darski; 10 June 1977 (age 49); Gdynia, Poland
- Genres: Blackened death metal; black metal; dark folk; alternative rock; blues; country
- Occupations: Musician; singer; songwriter
- Instruments: Vocals; guitar
- Years active: 1991–present
- Member of: Behemoth

Adam Nergal Darski (born Adam Michał Darski, 10 June 1977), often referred to by his stage name Nergal, is a Polish musician, best known as the frontman of the extreme metal band Behemoth.

== Career ==
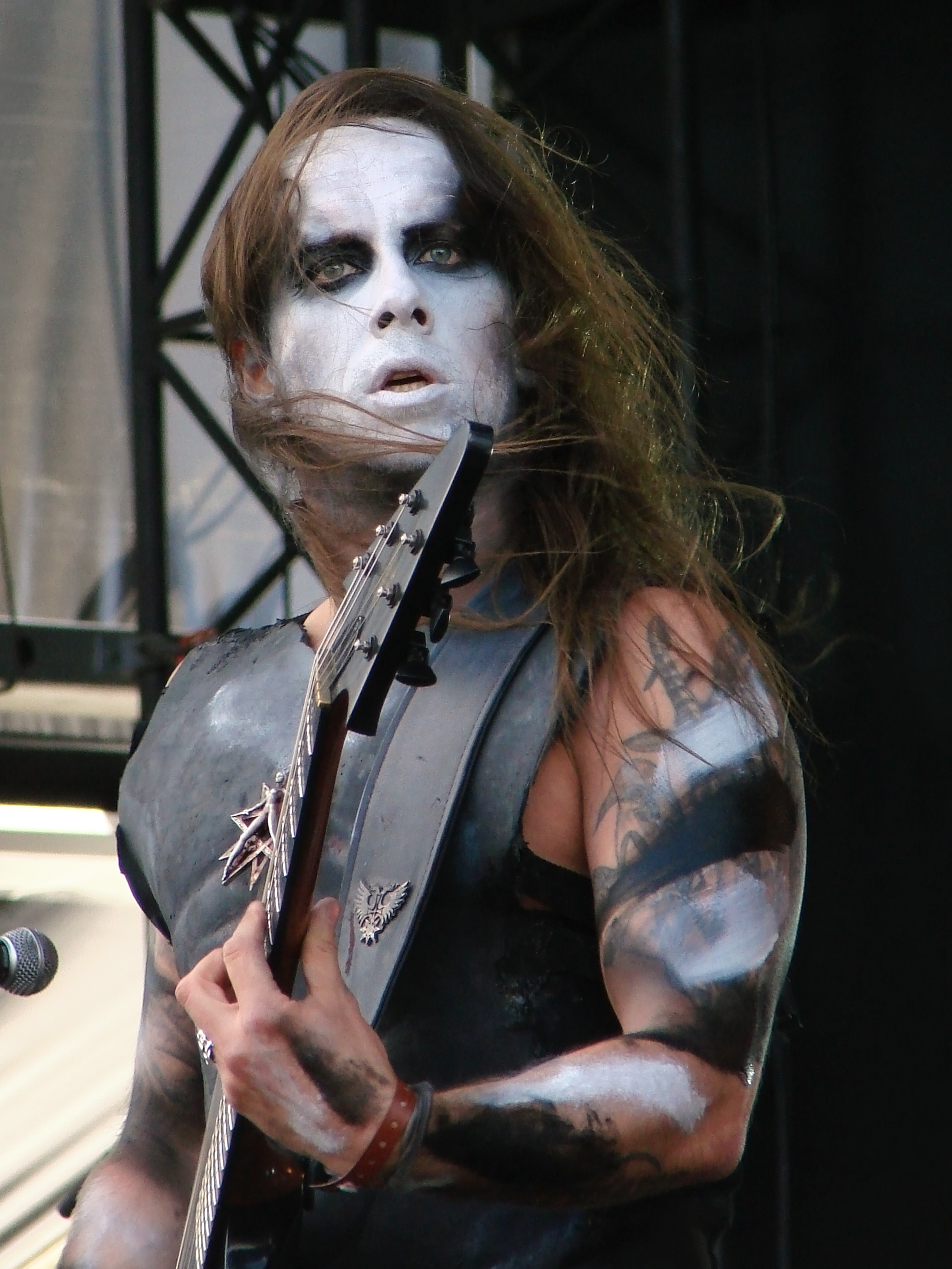
Nergal performing at Hellfest 2010

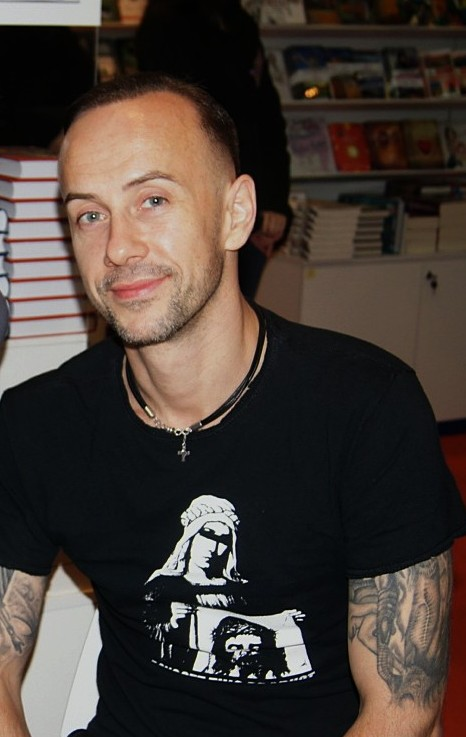
Darski in 2012

Nergal was born Adam Michał Darski in Gdynia, raised Catholic, and started playing guitar at age eight. He goes by the stage name Nergal (naming himself after a Babylonian deity), and he is the founder, lyricist, main composer, frontman and manager of the band Behemoth, which he started when he was still a teenager. He also plays lead, rhythm and acoustic guitar. For a brief time, he used the alias Holocausto. In the late 1990s, he was a vocalist and guitarist of the Danzig-influenced band, Wolverine, which was showcasing Nergal's capability of clean singing. He is also known for his contributions with the following bands: Hermh, Nile, Damnation, Vader, Sweet Noise, Mastiphal, December's Fire, Mess Age, Corruption, Hangover, Ex Deo, and Hefeystos.

Inspired by Norway's Black Circle, Nergal formed together with Blasphemous (from the band Veles) and Venom (from Xantotol) the Temple of Infernal Fire. Later other bands joined and far-right politics were introduced, and the group renamed the Temple of Fullmoon. Nergal then distanced himself from the group, mainly because he had no interest in politics. This led to remaining members of the Temple of Fullmoon to accuse Behemoth of betrayal and caused tensions between Nergal and Rob Darken, frontman of the Polish NSBM band Graveland, leading to death threats. Several years later, the tensions are gone and Nergal and Darken are on good terms nowadays; as Nergal said in an interview: "We don't share the same interests but we share a mutual respect."

In 2009, ESP guitars released the first Nergal's signature guitar. It is a 7-string guitar with a V-style body, which is called the "Hex-7".

Nergal started a solo project alongside John Porter called Me and that Man, which focuses on country, blues and folk. The project's debut album titled Songs of Love and Death was released on 24 March 2017. The project's follow-up album, New Man, New Songs, Same Shit, Vol. 1 was released on 27 March 2020, and features guest vocals from Corey Taylor, Niklas Kvarforth, Matt Heafy, Ihsahn, and others.

== Other ventures ==
Nergal has completed six years of history, including one year of Latin at University of Gdańsk, and is qualified to be a museum curator.

In 2011, he assumed the position of a coach on the Polish TV show The Voice of Poland.

In July 2012, Nergal became the newest spokesman for Demon Energy drinks that would be distributed throughout Poland. Nergal appeared in full Behemoth attire on the front of four different flavors of the Demon Energy brand alongside the brand's slogan of "No Limits, No Laws". Darski reportedly donated the majority of funds for this limited edition placement to one of the world's most renowned bone marrow donor centers.

== Legal issues ==
In March 2010, Nergal was held on trial in Poland on blasphemy charges for publicly denouncing religion by ripping up a Bible on stage in 2007. Nergal made the argument that he has artistic license to enhance his live performances by doing such an action, and suggested that it was not meant to be offensive. He also believes that freedom of speech should come before religion in Poland. He faced up to two years in prison due to the Bible-tearing, but Darski's charges were dropped on 28 June 2010.

In October 2012, Nergal returned to the Polish Supreme Court regarding the 2007 incident where he tore up a Bible and denounced the Catholic Church. The Supreme Court ruled that Darski could be guilty of the crime of "offending religious feelings" even though he did not act with the "direct intention" of doing so. The case was returned to a lower court which found him guilty of "intentionally insulting the Holy Bible."

He was sued in 2018 again under the "offending religious feelings" doctrine after displaying a crucified penis statuette in an Instagram video; he was acquitted in 2025.

In 2019, he caused controversy after posting photos of a t-shirt emblazoned with the message “Black metal against Antifa. Kill them. Show no mercy. Fuck Antifa!”.

== Personal life ==
From mid-2009 through early 2011, he was in a highly publicized relationship with Dorota Rabczewska, a Polish pop singer professionally known as Doda. On 17 March 2011, News.pl reported the couple had called off the engagement and broken up.

In 2012, Darski legally changed his middle name to 'Nergal'.

Since 2014, Nergal has been the co-owner of three barbershops in Poland—two in Warsaw and one in his hometown, Gdańsk. In 2015, he opened a nightclub in Sopot named Libation.

He has expressed support for the abortion-rights movement and for Ukraine during the Russian invasion of Ukraine.

Darski is a Satanist. Despite this he has stated that he celebrates Christmas. He said: "In the first place, you know, the fact that Christians stole those celebrations from Pagans [and] just put a different emblem, different sticker on it, and just adjusted some elements – it doesn’t gonna stop me from enjoying the fact that I can just chill and do nothing and relax with my family, because that's what Xmas is really all about."

=== Health ===
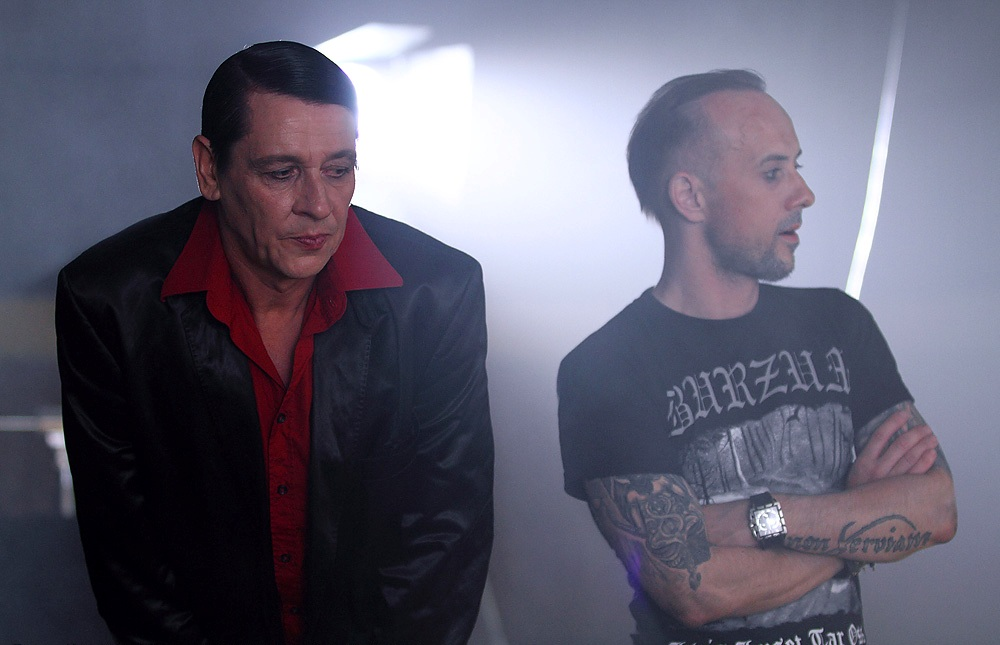
Maciej Maleńczuk and Nergal on the shooting set for the Behemoth video clip "Lucifer", 2011

On 8 August 2010, Nergal was rushed to the hematology ward of the Gdańsk Medical University Hospital for treatment of a then-undisclosed illness. All Behemoth shows through November 2010, including Russian and North American tours, were cancelled. On 24 August 2010, Darski was diagnosed with leukemia. The illness was thought to have advanced far enough to make chemotherapy ineffective, but such reports have since been proven false. His then-fiancée Dorota Rabczewska-Stępień offered to donate her marrow, but her marrow didn't match. On 8 November 2010, following his then-girlfriend's appeal to the wider public, which has been met with a great response, Darski underwent treatment to receive a bone marrow transplant.

Nergal was discharged from the Uniwersyteckie Centrum Kliniczne (UCK) hospital in Gdańsk on 16 January 2011, three weeks after undergoing a bone marrow transplantation. "Adam feels good and is resting comfortably but cannot see any visitors as he can’t risk viral infections", said his ex-fiancée, Doda. However, Nergal was readmitted to the hematology division of Uniwersyteckie Centrum Kliniczne (UCK) in Gdańsk after he developed an infection six weeks later. At the time, it was not immediately clear if the infection would affect Nergal's adoption of the bone marrow transplant and how long he would have to remain in hospital. On 30 March 2011, MetalSucks published an interview with Nergal where he said that his health was improving. As of the interview, he had been out of the hospital for several weeks, and, according to Darski, "everything is going according to plan".

== Equipment ==
Guitars

- B.C. Rich Warlock 6 string
- Jackson Kelly 6 string
- Jackson Rhoads 6 string
- Gibson Flying V 6 string
- Gibson Explorer (EMG 81/85 Setup) 6 String
- Ibanez RG 7620 7 string
- Mayones Signum Gothic 6 String
- Flame EXG Custom 7 string
- Dean V 6 string
- ESP LTD EC-1000 6 string
- ESP LTD Ninja-600 Michael Amott Signature 6 String
- ESP STEF-7 7 string
- ESP M-7 Super Long Scale 7 string
- ESP V Custom 6 String
- ESP LTD HEX-7 Nergal Signature 7 String
- ESP V-II
- Gretsch White Falcon
- ESP LTD PHOENIX-1000
- ESP LTD Nergal-6
- ESP LTD Nergal NS-6

Mark L Rack

- Mark L MIDI Control System F-25
- Mark L Loop & Switch LS-14
- Mark L Power Station Custom
- Mark L Mini Line Mixer
- Eventide Time Factor
- Ibanez TS-808
- Boss Pitch
- ISP Decimator Pro Rack G
- Dunlop Custom Rack Wah
- Mogami Cable
- Furman Power
- Korg DTR 1 Tuner
- Neutrik & Switchcraft

Amplifiers

- Laboga Mr. Hector
- Krank Krankenstein
- Hellstone Prodigy
- Mesa Dual Rectifier
- Bogner Uberschall
- Sommatone Signature Outlaw Head

Other

- Morley wah pedal
- Nologo Behemoth custom picks

== Discography ==
=== Me and that Man ===
- Songs of Love and Death (2017)
- New Man, New Songs, Same Shit: Vol. 1 (2020)
- New Man, New Songs, Same Shit: Vol. 2 (2021)

=== Guest appearances ===
- Mastiphal – Nocturnal Landscape (1994; drums)
- Hermh – Crying Crown of Trees (1996; bass guitar)
- December's Fire – Vae Victis (1996; vocals)
- Damnation – Coronation (1997; bass guitar)
- Hefeystos – Psycho Cafe (1998; vocals)
- Hangover – Terrorbeer (2002; vocals)
- Vader – Revelations (2002; vocals)
- Mess Age – Self-Convicted (2002; vocals)
- Corruption – Orgasmusica (2003; vocals)
- Sweet Noise – Revolta (2003; vocals)
- Frontside – Teoria Konspiracji (2008; vocals)
- The Amenta – n0n (2008; vocals)
- Ex Deo – Romulus (2009; vocals)
- Vulgar – The Professional Blasphemy (2010; vocals)
- Czesław Śpiewa – Pop (2010; vocals)
- Root – Heritage of Satan (2011; vocals)
- Voodoo Gods – Shrunken Head (2012; vocals)
- Grzegorz Skawiński – Me & My Guitar (2012; guitar)
- Maciej Maleńczuk – Psychocountry (2012; vocals)
- Rome – The Lone Furrow (2020; vocals)
- Ibaraki - Rashomon (2022; vocals)

== Filmography ==
- Historia polskiego rocka (2008, documentary, directed: Leszek Gnoiński, Wojciech Słota)
- Ambassada (2013)

== Publications ==
- A. Darski, P. Weltrowski, K. Azarewicz, Spowiedź heretyka. Sacrum Profanum, G+J Gruner+Jahr Poland 2012, ISBN 978-83-7778-197-5
