= Azarath (band) =

Polish death metal band

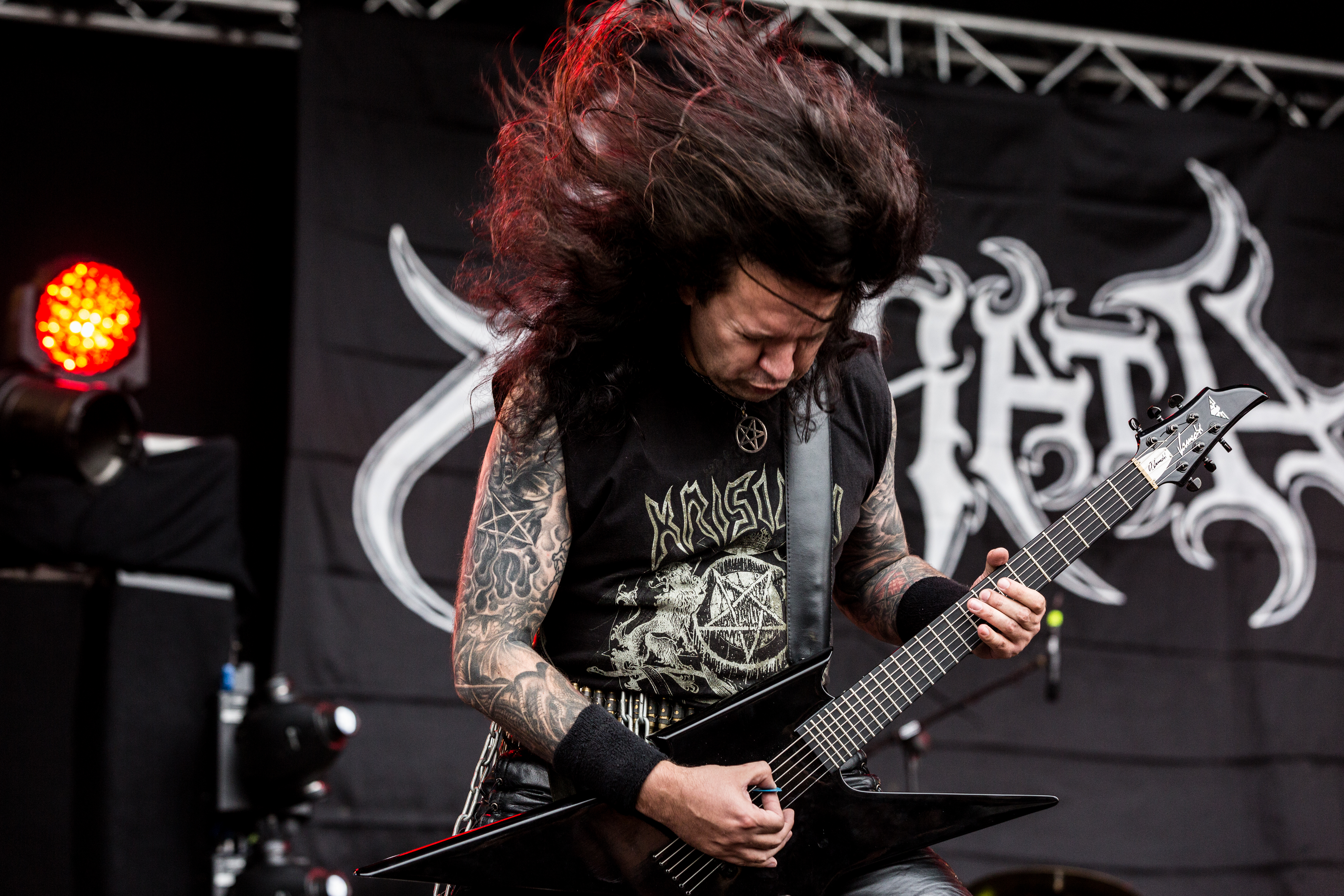
- Bart, 2017

Background information
- Origin: Tczew, Poland
- Genre: Blackened death metal
- Years active: 1998–present
- Labels: Pagan, Time Before Time, Agonia, Deathgasm, Witching Hour Productions
- Website: www.azarath.tcz.pl

Azarath is a Polish death metal band from Tczew, formed in 1998.

== History ==
Azarath was formed in October 1998 by Inferno, Bruno and D. The band then recorded their first demos, Traitors and Destroy Yourself. After being joined by Bart and completing the lineup, the band then played many shows to support the demos and eventually wrote and recorded their debut album, Demon Seed, in Hertz Studio. The album was met with positive reviews and good response, which got the band an invitation from Polish death metal band Vader to be a supporting act for Vader's Revelations Tour in 2002.

In late August 2003, the band recorded their second album, Infernal Blasting, in Hendrix Studio. Like the first album, it was met with a positive response from critics and fans. After the recording session for the album, D. left the band because of personal reasons. The band eventually found a second guitarist, Trufel, from the band Yattering, and began touring to promote new album.

Between June and August 2006, the band recorded their third album, Diabolic Impious Evil, at Hendrix Studio and Hertz Studio. The album was released on 16 September 2006. After the release of the album, the band started touring in the Blitzkrieg 4 tour, supporting Vader, along with Vesania and Trauma. In November 2007, the band played the Legions of Death Attack Tour in Poland with Adam Sierzega on drums, the former drummer of Lost Soul, together with Stillborn and Deception.

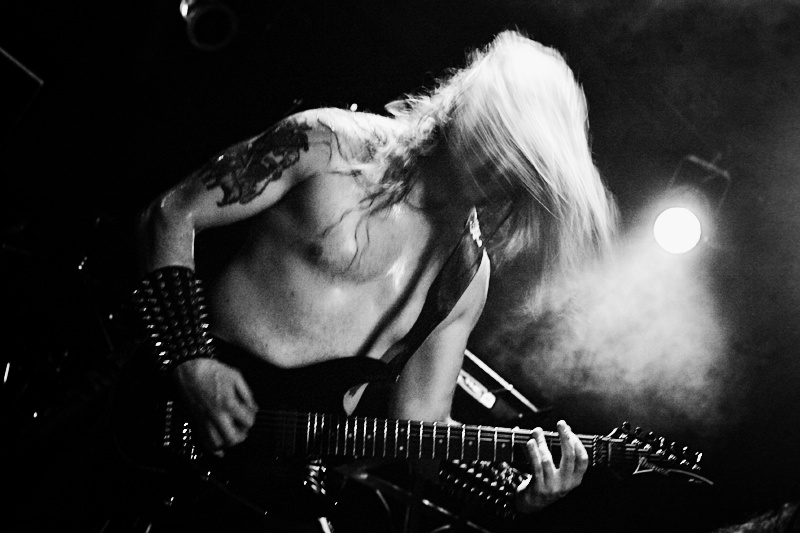
Necrosodom, 2011

In October 2008, the band signed a new deal with Agonia Records upon release of their forthcoming fourth studio album, Praise the Beast, which was released as a standard CD, LP and limited digipak with bonus tracks. At around the same time, the band signed with American record label Deathgasm Records for a standard CD release for the North American territory. The album was released on 25 May 2009. The band played several festivals to support the album, including the Inferno Metal Festival in Oslo in April, the Devilstone Fest in Lithuania in June, and the PartySan Fest in Germany in August 2009. Later on, for eleven days during September and October 2009, the band (along with Hermh and Black River) supported Behemoth on their Polish "Evangelion" tour. After the tour, Bruno decided to leave the band and focus on his private life. The band continued on with Necrosodom, from the bands Anima Damnata, Thunderbolt, and Throneum, as the new bass player and vocalist.

In January 2011, the band underwent further lineup changes. The band split up with Thrufel, and Necrosodom took over guitar duties instead of bass. The band recruited P. as the new bassist. Towards the end of 2010, the band signed Witching Hour Productions. Shortly after, recording sessions for the band's fifth album took place between January and February 2011 in Hertz Studio, where the Wiesławscy Bros were responsible for production, mixing, and mastering. On 10 April, Witching Hour released an EP titled Holy Possession, which consisted of the title track and a cover of "Rebel Souls" by the band Damnation. The band's fifth album, Blasphemers' Maledictions, was released on 6 June 2011 by Witching Hour Productions. In September 2011 the band began touring for the album by playing a tour in Poland along with Italian band Bulldozer, and Polish bands Witchmaster and Deus Mortem. In December 2011 the band played the European Hatefest Tour, supporting acts like Triptykon, Marduk, and Kataklysm. During the summer of 2012 the band played the Extreme Festival in Germany, Austria, and Switzerland.

== Band members ==
Current members

- Zbigniew "Inferno" Promiński – drums (1998–present)
- Bartłomiej "Bart" Szudek – guitars (2000–present)
- Piotr "P." Ostrowski – bass (2011–present)
- Marcin "Skullripper" Sienkiel – vocals, guitars (2017–present)

Former members

- Radosław "Thorn" Murawski – bass guitar (1998–2000)
- Andrzej "D." Zdrojewski – guitars (1998–2003)
- Bartłomiej "Bruno" Waruszewski – vocals (1998–2009), bass (2000–2009), guitar (1998–2000)
- Mariusz "Trufel" Domaradzki – guitars (2003–2011)
- Marek "Necrosodom" Lechowski – vocals (2009–2017), guitars (2011–2017), bass (2009–2011)

Current live musicians

- Paweł "Stormblast" Pietrzak – drums (2011–present)
- Michał "Armagog" Samol - bass (2019–present)

Live musicians

- Tomasz "Reyash" Rejek – bass (2012–present)
- Dariusz "Daray" Brzozowski – drums (2003)
- Krzysztof "Vizun" Saran – drums (2005, 2006)
- Adam Sierżęga – drums (2007–2010)
- Piotr "Lord Kaos" Jeziorski – vocals (2017)
- Witek Ustapiuk – guitars (2017)

Timeline

== Discography ==
=== Studio albums ===
- Demon Seed (2001)
- Infernal Blasting (2003)
- Diabolic Impious Evil (2006)
- Praise the Beast (2009)
- Blasphemers' Maledictions (2011)
- In Extremis (2017)
- Saint Desecration (2020)
- Scorn Eternal (2026)

=== EPs ===
- Holy Possession (2011)

=== Demos ===
- Traitors (1998)
- Destroy Yourself (2000)

=== Splits ===
- Death Monsters (with Stillborn) (2004)
