= Devilish Impressions =

Polish avant-garde black metal band

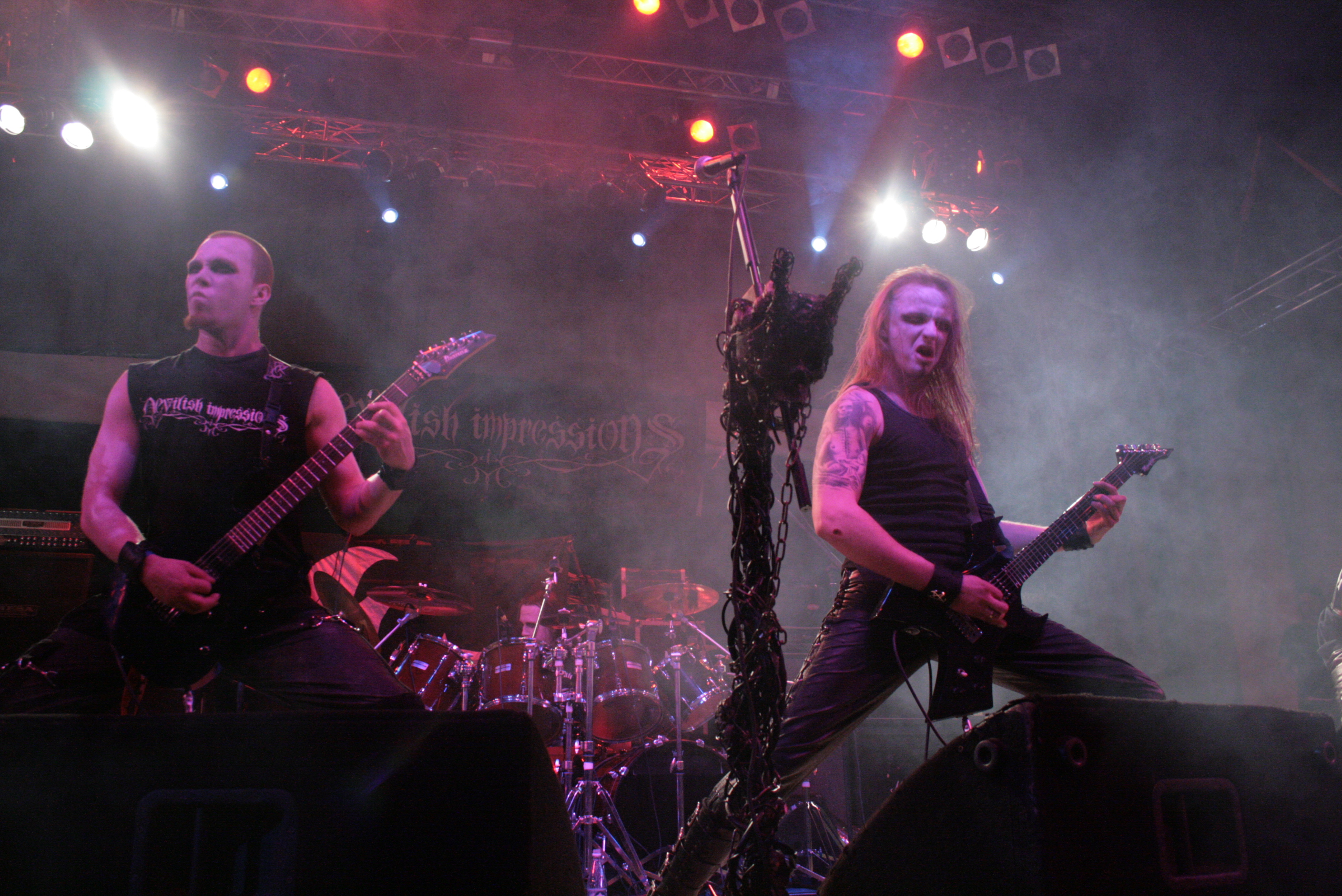
- Devilish Impressions performing, 2008

Background information
- Origin: Opole, Poland
- Genres: Black metal; avant-garde metal; death metal; blackened death metal
- Years active: 2000–present
- Labels: Hammerheart; Lifeforce; MSR Productions; Conquer Records; Empire Records; Icaros Records
- Members: Przemysław "Quazarre" Olbryt; Łukasz "Icanraz" Sarnacki; Marcin "Vraath" Majewski
- Past members: (see below)
- Website: www.devilish-impressions.com

Devilish Impressions is a Polish avant-garde black metal band. Considered one of Poland's leading metal acts, Devilish Impressions started in 2000 as a three-piece. Founding singer / guitarist Quazarre is the only remaining original member.

== Early years ==
The band self-released the 45-minute-long Eritis sicut Deus; Verbum Diaboli Manet in Aeternum; Vox Vespertilio Act I – Moon Var Dies Iraein 2002.

In 2005, they recorded "Plurima Mortis Imago", released in September 2006 on the London-based Conquer Records. The video for the song "SataniChaoSymphony" was shot in London. Two months later, Devilish Impressions toured with Aeternus as part of the European "Ageless Void Tour". In April 2007, they secured a direct support slot on Marduk's "Swords In The East" Eastern European run.

== Diabolicanos – Act III: Armageddon and Extensive Touring ==
After the successful tours, in May 2007, the group entered Studio X to record their second full-length album, "Diabolicanos – Act III: Armageddon". While Andy Classen mastered the record at Stage One Studio, Devilish Impressions appeared at Red Alert Festival in the Crimea, accompanying such acts as Suffocation and Vader.

In Autumn 2007, Devilish Impressions shot the video for the song "Har-Magedon", to promote the "Diabolicanos..." album. At the end of the year, the band set off for the "Verbum Diaboli Tour", their first headlining run across Eastern European countries.

The "Diabolicanos..." album, released in January 2008 on Conquer Records, was praised in the international metal press. It gave Devilish Impressions the opportunity to open for Behemoth and Suicide Silence on "The Apostasy European Tour", and then embark with Dismember for the "UK, Ireland and Northern Ireland Tour". Meanwhile, the group was invited for selected shows of Wacken Road Show 2008 yet, due to above-mentioned tours having been booked earlier, they joined the WRS bill, Overkill, Tristania, Samael and Enslaved, for a show in Kyiv only.

In May 2008, the album came out in Poland, licensed to Empire Records. The same month, Devilish Impressions joined Hate for the "Rebel Angels Tour". They dropped off from the tour's last date, as they had been booked for a show with Satyricon in Ukraine.

The summer of 2008 included the band's appearance at Pro Rock Festival, while co-headlining with Rage and at Metal Heads Mission Festival with Moonspell, Gorgoroth, Samael, and others.

After finishing the touring cycle in support to the "Diabolicanos..." album, Devilish Impressions faced professional and personal problems, leading to shifts in their line-up and temporary stage absence.

== Simulacra and Fear No Gods of the East Tour ==
In the middle of 2009, Quazarre composed the successor to "Diabolicanos...", introducing thrash and heavy metal to the songwriting, and injecting brutality and catchiness in Devilish Impressions' music. Increasing clean vocals and a melodic side to the new songs made them sound more epic.

In the second half of 2010, Devilish Impressions entered a few recording studios, including Studio X and Hertz Studio to produce the full-length Simulacra. The recording session was backed up by session synth appearances of Flumen (Asgaard) and Lestath (METransmissionAL), as well as special guests, including Orion (Behemoth, Vesania), Jacek Grecki (Lost Soul) and Roman (Lecter), resulting in a sharp sound along with the artwork and lyrics based on works by famous poets.

Releasing the album in 2012 on several record labels: Lifeforce Records (Europe / North America), Icaros Records (Poland), MSR Productions (Russia / CIS countries), resulted in signing with The Flaming Arts Management and Booking Agency.

Nominated for a 2012 Metal Storm Award, Simulacra was voted one of the Best Melodic Black Metal / Metalgaze Album and received good press all over the world.

To support the record, the group appeared at several summer festivals, including Hard Rock Laager (with Samael, Melechesh), Carpathian Alliance (co-headlining with Dark Funeral, Carpathian Forest, Týr, Arkona), Castle Party and Brutal East, followed by "Fear no Gods of The East Tour 2013", a month-long headlining run across The Baltic States / Eastern European countries. After the tour, Devilish Impressions played at Wave Gotik Treffen (with Paradise Lost, Lacrimosa) and at MetalFest Open Air Poland (with Helloween, Accept, Sodom, Destruction, Down, Satyricon).

== Adventvs ==
During the Summer of 2013, the band entered Hertz Studio to record drums for the Adventvs EP. Months later, having the material mixed and mastered by Arkadiusz "Malta" Malczewski at Sound Division Studio, the band remastered their 2002 unreleased demo, Eritis Sicvt Devs, to add it up to the new tracks portraying the band's redefined sound. Released in May 2014, Adventvs features over an hour of new and old music.

In support of its premiere, Devilish Impressions headlined a tour across Poland. The material drew the attention of Hammerheart Records, which released a 12’’ MLP in February 2015.

Soon after that, the band toured with Christ Agony and Beheaded. Shortly after, the band appeared at NCM Festival Vol. 4 (co-headliner w/ Vader) and Dark Fest II (w/ Vader, Decapitated, Hate and more). Devilish Impressions returned to the studio in May 2015 to record "The I", the band's fourth full-length album.

== The I and a new chapter ==
After finishing recording the upcoming album, Devilish Impressions announced a tour of China and Taiwan supporting the Simulacra record, released in China through Mort Productions in September 2016. The trek lasted nearly a month.

At the same time, the band joined New York-based Extreme Management Group, Inc. alongside Suffocation, Cattle Decapitation, Origin, Cryptopsy, Atheist, Rings Of Saturn, King Parrot, and Internal Bleeding, among others. This partnership has led the band and management to work on a new album.

== Band members ==
Current members

- Przemysław "Quazarre" Olbryt - vocals, guitars, keyboards (2000–present)
- Jakub "Isemal" Bogatko - guitar (2018–present)
- Adam "Avernatvs" Niekrasz - drums (2018–present)

Former members

- Łukasz "Icanraz" Sarnacki - drums (2006–2018)
- Marcin "Vraath" Majewski - bass (2009–2018)
- Armers - guitars (2006-2012)
- Turqouissa - keyboards (2000-2008)
- Starash - guitars, bass (2000-2007)
- Adrian Nefarious - bass ('Plurima Mortis Imago' recording session 2005)
- Dragor - drums ('Plurima Mortis Imago' recording session 2005)

Former live members

- Exile - guitar (2012, 2015)
- I-gore - guitar (2014)
- Domin - guitar (2013)
- Cloud - drums (2007)
- Cultus - bass (2007-2008)

== Discography ==
=== Studio albums ===
- Plurima Mortis Imago (2006)
- Diabolicanos – Act III: Armageddon (2008)
- Simulacra (2012)
- The I (2017)

=== EPs ===
- Adventvs / Eritis sicvt Devs CD (2014)
- Adventvs MLP (2015)
- Postmortem Whispering Crows (2019)

=== Demos ===
- Eritis sicut Deus; Verbum Diaboli Manet in Aeternum; Vox Vespertilio Act I – Moon Var Dies Irae (2002)
