= Diabolicanos – Act III: Armageddon =

Studio album by Devilish Impressions
- Released: January 28, 2008
- Recorded: May–June 2007 at Studio X Olsztyn, Poland
- Genre: Black metal Symphonic black metal Avant-garde metal Blackened death metal
- Length: 50:49
- Label: Conquer Records

Devilish Impressions chronology
Plurima Mortis Imago (2005)	Diabolicanos – Act III: Armageddon (2008)

Diabolicanos – Act III: Armageddon is the second album by the Polish avant-garde black metal band Devilish Impressions. After their full-length debut Plurima Mortis Imago was released, the band attracted significant interest from many record labels and choosing the most favourably looking offer at that time, signed with London-based Conquer Records.

The band went through some line-up changes before the album was actually released, taking the band significantly up to the next level. The band recruited a new drummer, Łukasz "Icanraz" Sarnacki, known at the time for his work with polish hordes Hermh and Abused Majesty among others. The band also recruited a new guitarist, Armers having Starash take over bass duties.

Autumn 2007 saw Devilish Impressions shooting a video clip for the song Har-Magedon, set to promote the album. At the end of the year the band took off on their first ever headlining run across the Eastern European countries, "Verbum Diaboli Tour".

The success of the album gave Devilish Impressions the opportunity to open shows for titans Behemoth and Suicide Silence on their "The Apostasy European Tour", and then embark with Dismember on a tour through the UK, Ireland and Northern Ireland. Meanwhile, the group was invited for selected shows of Wacken Road Show 2008 but due to the above-mentioned tours having been booked earlier, they eventually managed to join the WRS bill, Overkill, Tristania, Samael and Enslaved, for a show in Kiev only. Also, the band joined Hate for their first ever Polish invasion named "Rebel Angels Tour", a special show with Satyricon in Ukraine and summer 2008 appearances 2008 that included the Pro Rock Festival while co-headlining with Rage and at Metal Heads Mission Festival with bands like Moonspell, Gorgoroth and Samael to name but a few.

== Track listing ==
1. T.H.O.R.N.S. - 3:58
2. Rex Inferni - 7:12
3. The Word Was Made Flesh Turned Into Chaos Again - 5:16
4. I Am The Son Of God - 4:20
5. Tales Of Babylon's Whore - 6:39
6. Diabolicanos - 5:23
7. Natas Ro Dog On Si Ereht (Of Plagues And Blasphemy) - 5:53
8. Har-Magedon - 4:04
9. Mass For The Dead - 8:04

Total playtime: 50:49 minutes.

== Personnel ==
- Przemyslaw "Quazarre" Olbryt - vocals, lead guitar, rhythm guitar
- Turquoissa - synthesizers
- Armers - lead guitar, rhythm guitar
- Starash - bass guitar
- Łukasz "Icanraz" Sarnacki - drums

=== Guest appearance ===
1. Szymon Czech from Nyia did guest leads on the song Tales of Babylon's Whore.
2. Cezar from Christ Agony did guest vocals on the song Diabolicanos.
3. Marcin Kiełbaszewski did additional voice in Latin choir on Natas Ro Dog On Si Ereht (Of Plagues And Blasphemy).
4. Cezar from Christ Agony also did guest vocals on the song Mass for the Dead.
