= List of Ligyra species =

This is a list of 92 species in Ligyra, a genus of bee flies in the family Bombyliidae.

== Ligyra species ==
- Ligyra alea Bowden, 1971
- Ligyra alula (Bezzi, 1906)
- Ligyra antica (Walker, 1871)
- Ligyra argyura (Brunetti, 1909)
- Ligyra astarte Greathead, 1980
- Ligyra atricosta (Bezzi, 1924)
- Ligyra audouinii (Macquart, 1840)
- Ligyra aurantiaca (Guérin, 1835)
- Ligyra bombyliformis (Macleay, 1826)
- Ligyra burnsi Paramonov, 1967
- Ligyra calabyana Paramonov, 1967
- Ligyra campbelli Paramonov, 1967
- Ligyra celebesi (Paramonov, 1931)
- Ligyra chinnicki Paramonov, 1967
- Ligyra chrysolampis (Jaennicke, 1867)
- Ligyra cingulata (Wulp, 1885)
- Ligyra coleopterata (Bezzi, 1921)
- Ligyra commoni Paramonov, 1967
- Ligyra cruciata Bowden, 1971
- Ligyra cupido (Bezzi, 1924)
- Ligyra curvata (Meijere, 1911)
- Ligyra dammermani Evenhuis & Yukawa, 1986
- Ligyra dentata (Roberts, 1928)
- Ligyra devecta (Walker, 1860)
- Ligyra dives (Walker, 1849)
- Ligyra doryca (Boisduval, 1835)
- Ligyra erato Bowden, 1971
- Ligyra erebus (Walker, 1849)
- Ligyra eyreana Paramonov, 1967
- Ligyra fasciata Paramonov, 1967
- Ligyra ferrea (Walker, 1849)
- Ligyra flaviventris (Doleschall, 1857)
- Ligyra flavofasciata (Macquart, 1855)
- Ligyra flavotomentosa (Meijere, 1929)
- Ligyra flora (Frey, 1934)
- Ligyra formosana (Paramonov, 1931) (temperate Asia)
- Ligyra fuscipennis (Macquart, 1848)
- Ligyra galbina Yang, Yao & Cui, 2012
- Ligyra gebleri (Loew, 1854)
- Ligyra guangdonanus Yang, Yao & Cui, 2012
- Ligyra helena (Loew, 1854)
- Ligyra hemifusca (Roberts, 1928)
- Ligyra herzi (Portschinsky, 1891)
- Ligyra incondita Yang, Yao & Cui, 2012
- Ligyra inquinita (Roberts, 1928)
- Ligyra latipennis (Paramonov, 1931) (temperate Asia)
- Ligyra leptyna Bowden, 1971
- Ligyra leuconoe (Jaennicke, 1867)
- Ligyra leukon Yang, Yao & Cui, 2012
- Ligyra macassarensis (Paramonov, 1931)
- Ligyra melanoptera Bowden, 1964
- Ligyra merope (Wiedemann, 1824)
- Ligyra minerva Paramonov, 1953
- Ligyra nigripennis (Loew, 1852)
- Ligyra nigrocostalis (Guérin-Méneville, 1838)
- Ligyra niveifrons (Bezzi, 1914)
- Ligyra obliqua (Macquart, 1840)
- Ligyra ochracea Bowden, 1971
- Ligyra oenomaus (Rondani, 1875)
- Ligyra orest Paramonov, 1967
- Ligyra orientalis (Paramonov, 1931) (temperate Asia)
- Ligyra orphnus Yang, Yao & Cui, 2012
- Ligyra paludosa (Meijere, 1911)
- Ligyra peninsularis Pal, 1991
- Ligyra pilad Paramonov, 1967
- Ligyra punctipennis (Macquart, 1850)
- Ligyra purpuraria (Walker, 1852)
- Ligyra robertsi Paramonov, 1967
- Ligyra satyrus (Fabricius, 1775)
- Ligyra semialata Yang, Yao & Cui, 2012
- Ligyra semifuscata (Brunetti, 1912)
- Ligyra septentrionis (Roberts, 1928)
- Ligyra shirakii (Paramonov, 1931) (temperate Asia)
- Ligyra similis (Coquillett, 1898)
- Ligyra sinuatifascia (Macquart, 1855)
- Ligyra sphinx (Fabricius, 1787)
- Ligyra suffusipennis (Brunetti, 1909)
- Ligyra sumatrensis (Meijere, 1911)
- Ligyra tantalus (Fabricius, 1794) (temperate Asia)
- Ligyra tenebrosa Paramonov, 1967
- Ligyra thyridophora (Bezzi, 1912)
- Ligyra transiens (Bezzi, 1924)
- Ligyra tristis (Wulp, 1869)
- Ligyra umbrifer (Walker, 1849)
- Ligyra unicincta (Guérin, 1831)
- Ligyra ussuriensis (Paramonov, 1934)
- Ligyra ventrimacula (Doleschall, 1857)
- Ligyra virgo (Bezzi, 1924)
- Ligyra vittata (Ricardo, 1901)
- Ligyra vulcanus (Bezzi, 1924)
- Ligyra zibrina Yang, Yao & Cui, 2012
- Ligyra zonata Yang, Yao & Cui, 2012
