= Praise the Beast =

Studio album by Azarath
- Released: 25 May 2009
- Recorded: September 2008 at RG Studio, Gdańsk; October 2008 at Progresja Studio, Warsaw; January 2009 at Sounds Great Promotion Studio, Gdynia
- Genre: Death metal, blackened death metal
- Length: 41:31
- Label: Agonia, Deathgasm
- Producer: Azarath

Azarath chronology
Diabolic Impious Evil (2006)	Praise the Beast (2009)	Blasphemers' Maledictions (2011)

Professional ratings
Review scores
Source	Rating
Blabbermouth.net	8/10 stars

Praise the Beast is the fourth studio album by Polish death metal band Azarath. It was released on 25 May 2009 by Agonia Records. It was also released on American label Deathgasm Records.

The drums for the album were recorded at RG Studio in Gdańsk, Poland during September 2008. The guitars and bass were recorded at Progresja Studio in Warsaw during October 2008. The vocals and solos, as well as mixing and mastering for the album, were done at Sounds Great Promotion Studio in Gdynia, Poland between January and March 2009.

== Track listing ==
All music composed by Bart and Inferno. All lyrics written by Baal Ravenlock.

No.	Title	Length
1.	"Summoning" (Instrumental)	0:55
2.	"I Hate Your Kind"	4:25
3.	"Sacrifice of Blood"	4:05
4.	"Invocation"	3:58
5.	"Praise the Beast"	5:35
6.	"Queen of the Sabbath"	5:21
7.	"Azazel"	2:54
8.	"Unholy Trinity"	4:16
9.	"Obey the Flesh"	4:04
10.	"Throne of Skulls"	3:30
11.	"From Beyond the Coldest Star" (Instrumental)	2:33
Total length:		41:31

Bonus track
No.	Title	Length
12.	"Ave Satanas" (Acheron cover)	4:05

== Credits ==
Azarath

- Bartłomiej "Bruno" Waruszewski – vocals, bass
- Bartłomiej "Bart" Szudek – guitars
- Mariusz "Trufel" Domaradzki – guitars
- Zbigniew "Inferno" Promiński – drums

Additional musicians

- Cezary Augustynowicz (Christ Agony) – vocals on "Ave Satanas"

Production

- Arkadiusz "Malta" Malczewski – engineering, mixing
- Monika Serafińska – photography
- Kuba Mańkowski – mastering
- Ataman Tolovy – cover concept, artwork, layout
