= The Warratahs =

New Zealand band

- Origin: New Zealand
- Genres: Rock, Americana, country rock, country music, alternative country, rockabilly, roots rock, folk rock, Progressive country
- Years active: 1984–present
- Members: Barry Saunders; Nik Brown; Nick Theobald; Mike Knapp; Caroline Easther
- Past members: Wayne Mason; Clint Brown; Alan Norman; Mo Newport; Sid Limbert; Rob Clarkson; John Donoghue
- Website: www.thewarratahs.com

The Warratahs are a long-running band from Wellington, New Zealand. In 2016, they won Best Country Music album for Runaway Days at the New Zealand Music Awards. In 2025, the band was inducted into the New Zealand Music Hall of Fame.

== Band members ==
=== Early line-ups ===
- Barry Saunders – vocals/guitar
- Wayne Mason – keyboards/vocals
- Nik Brown – fiddle
- John Donoghue – bass
- Marty Jorgensen – drums
- Clint Brown – bass
- Rob Clarkson – drums
- Mike Knapp – drums

=== 2007 line-up ===
- Barry Saunders – vocals/guitar
- Alan Norman – keyboards & accordion
- Nik Brown – fiddle & mandolin
- Mo' Newport – drums
- Sid Limbert – bass

== Tours ==
The Warratahs have toured and performed with a variety of artists including Bob Dylan, Billy Joel, Lucinda Williams, Leann Rimes and Jackson Browne.

The Warratahs also toured with The Carter Family featuring June Carter Cash, Anita Carter and Carlene Carter in addition to the Highwaymen, which featured Johnny Cash, Willie Nelson, Kris Kristofferson and Waylon Jennings.

== 2025 New Album Release ==
The Warratahs released a new album in 2025 on Southbound Records entitled Burning Daylight.

== Discography ==
Date of release	Title	Label	NZ peak	Certification	Catalog no.
Albums
1988	Only Game in Town	Pagan	14	-	PACD 1032
1989	Too Hot to Sleep	Pagan	20	-	PACD 1046
1990	Wild Card	Pagan	22	-	PACD 1066
1993	Big Sky (billed as "Warratahs")	Pagan	12	-	PACD 1096
1994	The Best of The Warratahs	Pagan	18	-	PACD 1114
2000	One of Two Things	Jayrem	-	-	CDJAY 362
2003	The Warratahs Collection	Pagan	16	-	PACD 1148
2006	Keep On...		-	-	
2015	Runaway Days		19	-	
2025	Burning Daylight	Southbound		-	

=== Compilation appearances ===
The group have appeared on a few compilations since their inception. The following is a list of these albums that have featured tracks by the Warratahs.

- Godzone Beat (1988, Warrior Records) – "Maureen"
- New Zealand: Our Land, Our Music (1995, EMI) – "Cruisin' on the Interislander"
- Pagan Gold (2001, Pagan Records) – "Maureen"
- The Very Best of Kiwi Country (2001, EMI) – "Hand of My Heart" and "Maureen"

=== Featured appearances ===
The Warratahs have also appeared on albums recorded by other artists. The following is a list of albums by other artists that the Warratahs have appeared on.

- The Gypsy Pickers and Friends (2004) by the Gypsy Pickers (Rimu Records) – "West Coast Bound"
