= Nyia gazophylax =

Scientific classification
- Kingdom: Animalia
- Phylum: Arthropoda
- Clade: Pancrustacea
- Class: Insecta
- Order: Diptera
- Family: Bombyliidae
- Tribe: Exoprosopini
- Genus: Nyia
- Species: N. gazophylax

Binomial name
- Nyia gazophylax (Loew, 1869)

Synonyms
- Exoprosopa gazophylax Loew, 1869; Ligyra gazophylax (Loew, 1869)

Species of fly

Nyia gazophylax is a species of bee flies in the family Bombyliidae. It is found in North and Central America, from the southwestern United States (Arizona, California) to Panama.
