= Plurima Mortis Imago =

Studio album by Devilish Impressions
- Released: September 2005
- Recorded: August 2005
- Genre: Black metal Symphonic black metal Avant-garde metal Blackened death metal
- Length: 44:49
- Producer: Self-released

Devilish Impressions chronology
Eritis sicut Deus; Verbum Diaboli Manet in Aeternum; Vox Vespertilio Act I – Moon Var Dies Irae (2002)	Plurima Mortis Imago (2005)	Diabolicanos – Act III: Armageddon (2008)

Plurima Mortis Imago is the debut album by the Polish avant-garde black metal band Devilish Impressions. The band was able to recruit Dragor to do the drums and Adrian Nefarious to play the bass guitar, both members of Luna Ad Noctum. The title is taken from the Latin poet Virgil, Aeneid 2.369.

The musical arrangements were far better than their demo and they decided to record the instruments at different studios. The drums and guitars were recorded at Mamut Studio by Maciek Mularczyk and Wojtek Nowak. And all the synths and vocals at Hendrix Studios, Lublin by Arek "Malta" Malczewski. A man well known for his long-time relationship with Behemoth. Al the material was mixed at the home studio of Wojtek "Flumen" Kostrzewa and mastered by the Wiesławscy brothers of Studio Hertz, Białystok, all in September, 2005.

== Track listing ==
1. "Lunarium" - 0:57
2. "Rebellion of Will Manifesto" - 6:02
3. "Visions of Kingdom To Come" - 4:25
4. "Dracula's Mechanized Universe" - 6:07
5. "Funeral of God" - 7:50
6. "Alpha and Omega Spaces" - 1:32
7. "Crowned To Be Crucified" - 3:31
8. "Smell of Death" - 10:05
9. "SataniChaoSymphony" - 4:20

Total playtime: 44:49 minutes.

=== Notes ===
1. The ending part of Dracula's Mechanized Universe originally written by Ludwig van Beethoven in interpretation of Turquoissa.

== Personnel ==
- Przemyslaw "Quazarre" Olbryt - vocals, lead guitar, rhythm guitar
- Turquoissa - synthesizers
- Starash - lead guitar, rhythm guitar
- Adrian Nefarious - bass guitar
- Dragor - drums
