= Profanum (band) =

Polish band

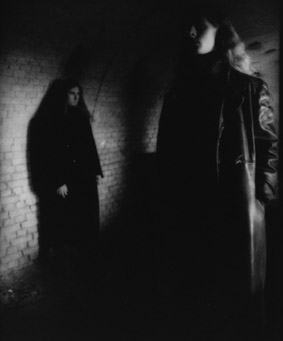
- From left: Vlad Ysengrimm and Geryon, 2001

Background information
- Origin: Zielona Góra, Poland
- Genres: Black metal Ambient music
- Years active: 1993–1997; 2000–?
- Labels: Astral Wings Records (1996); Pagan Records (1997–?)
- Members: Geryon; Vlad Ysengrimm
- Past members: Lord Reyash

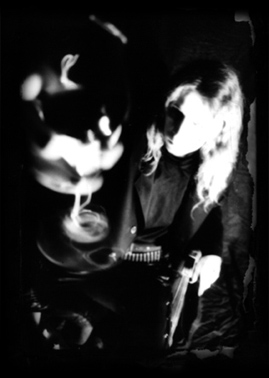
Geryon, 2001

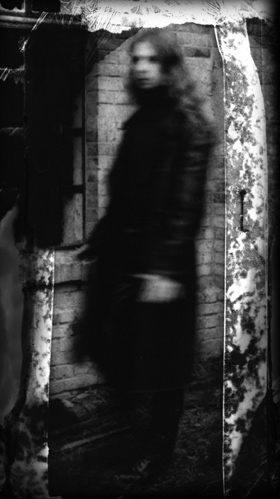
Vlad Ysengrimm, 2001

Profanum is a Polish music group that initially performed black metal before transitioning to ambient music with influences from industrial music. Formed in 1993 in Zielona Góra, the band was founded by musicians known by the pseudonyms Geryon (music, lyrics), Vlad Ysengrimm (vocals, lyrics), and Lord Reyash (bass guitar, vocals).

Since 1997, the band has collaborated with Pagan Records. By 2005, Profanum released six works that received critical acclaim, but the band does not perform live due to high organizational costs. The band has been featured in publications such as Metal Hammer, Thrash'em All, Mystic Art, and 7 Gates. Since 2005, there have been no reports of the band's activities.

== History ==
Profanum was formed in 1993 in Zielona Góra by musicians known as Geryon (music, lyrics), Vlad Ysengrimm (vocals, lyrics), and Lord Reyash (bass guitar, vocals). In 1994, the band self-released their first demo, Under the Black Wings of Emperor, inspired by bands such as Mystifier, Rotting Christ, Varathron, and Massacre. In 1996, the Kielce-based label Astral Wings Records released Profanum's debut album, Flowers of Our Black Misanthropy.

In February 1997, Pagan Records released the band's second album, Profanum Aeternum: Eminence of Satanic Imperial Art, which marked a stylistic shift, recorded without guitars. The album received positive reviews, earning 11/12 points in Thrash'em All. Shortly after, the band suspended activities. In 2000, without bassist Lord Reyash, Profanum resumed work and began recording Musaeum Esotericum, released in 2001 by Pagan Records. The album featured two extended suites, with the lyrics for Atri Misanthropiae Floris written before the second album.

In 2002, due to the sold-out limited run of Flowers of Our Black Misanthropy and at the urging of Pagan Records' owner Tomasz Krajewski, the album was reissued as Misantropiae Floris. The reissue included a new track, Overture: The Enigmatic House of Sir Knott, an unreleased piece's opening section. A guest musician, Czarny, played piano on the recording. According to a 2002 interview with Geryon in Metal Hammer, the band's activities were limited to releasing recordings.

In 2003, Profanum composed and produced music for the psychedelic film Intelekt Kollapse, directed by Jacek "Katos" Katarzyński and Geryon. The film featured Roman Garbowski and eLL, the vocalist of Sui Generis Umbra. It premiered at Zielona Góra's Newa Cinema on 9 and 18 March 2004. That year, the film won a special award and a nomination for "Best Cinematography" at the Tofifest International Film Festival in Toruń. In 2005, Pagan Records released the film on DVD, including three Profanum audio tracks: Theme 1: Transformation, Theme 2: Kollapse, and Theme 3: Objekts & Komedown.

== Music and lyrics ==
Profanum's work explores themes such as misanthropy, nihilism, satanism, postmodernism, and structuralism. Geryon has cited influences including bands like Mystifier, Rotting Christ, Varathron, and Massacre, as well as writers and philosophers such as Samuel Beckett, John Milton, Immanuel Kant, Friedrich Nietzsche, Max Stirner, Marquis de Sade, Jean-Paul Sartre, Søren Kierkegaard, and Stanisław Ignacy Witkiewicz.

In its later years, the band's interest in classical music (Igor Stravinsky, Sergei Prokofiev, Modest Mussorgsky) and avant-garde acts (Das Ich, Laibach, Shinjuku Thief, Devil Doll, Einstürzende Neubauten) led to a shift in sound, eliminating bass and electric guitars in favor of ambient styles.

The lyrics of the debut album Flowers of Our Black Misanthropy were written in English. On the second album, Profanum Aeternum: Eminence of Satanic Imperial Art, the tracks The Descent Into Medieval Darkness and Journey Into The Nothingness were sung in Polish despite their English titles. For Musaeum Esotericum, the band used Latin lyrics with Polish fragments. The album's booklet included a Greek quote.

== Artwork ==
The band's album artwork is minimalist, using a black-and-white color scheme with the band's logo, featuring an integrated Cross of Saint Peter, prominent on the last three albums' covers. The artwork was created by Tomasz Krajewski, also the publisher for Pagan Records. Photoshoots of the band were conducted by Eliza, a vocalist of Sui Generis Umbra.
