= Diabolic Impious Evil =

Studio album by Azarath
- Released: 16 September 2006
- Recorded: Hendrix Studios, 18–25 June 2006; Hertz Studio, 4–8 August 2006
- Genres: Death metal, blackened death metal
- Length: 32:47
- Label: Pagan Records
- Producers: Wojciech Wiesławski, Sławomir Wiesławski

Azarath chronology
Infernal Blasting (2003)	Diabolic Impious Evil (2006)	Praise the Beast (2009)

Professional ratings
Review scores
Source	Rating
Chronicles of Chaos	8/10 stars

Diabolic Impious Evil' is the third studio album by Polish death metal band Azarath. It was released on 16 September 2006 by Pagan Records.

== Track listing ==
No.	Title	Lyrics	Music	Length
1.	"Whip the Whore"	Baal	Bart	3:51
2.	"Baptized in Sperm of the Antichrist"	Dołek666	Bart, Inferno	3:00
3.	"Devil's Stigmata"	Dołek666	Bart	2:29
4.	"Anti-Human, Anti-God"	Baal	Bart	4:47
5.	"For Satan My Blood"	Dołek666	Bart	1:45
6.	"Screamin' Legions Death Metal"	Baal	Bart	3:24
7.	"Intoxicated by Goat Vomit"	Dołek666	Bart, Inferno	2:28
8.	"Angels' Assassins"	Buzii	Inferno	3:18
9.	"Beast Inside"	Baal	Inferno	2:44
10.	"Goathorned's Revenge"	Dołek666	Bart	5:01
Total length:				32:47

== Credits ==
Azarath

- Bartłomiej "Bruno" Waruszewski - vocals, bass guitar
- Bartłomiej "Bart" Szudek - guitars
- Mariusz "Trufel" Domaradzki - guitars
- Zbigniew "Inferno" Promiński - drums

Production

- Arkadiusz "Malta" Malczewski - sound engineering
- Wojciech and Sławomir Wiesławscy - sound engineering, producing, mixing
- Adam "Baal Ravenlock" Muraszko, Dołek666, Michał "Buzii" Kowalski - lyrics
- Krzysztof "Sado" Sadowski - photography
- Andrzej "D." Zdrojewski - layout
