= Nyia =

Scientific classification
- Kingdom: Animalia
- Phylum: Arthropoda
- Clade: Pancrustacea
- Class: Insecta
- Order: Diptera
- Family: Bombyliidae
- Tribe: Exoprosopini
- Genus: Nyia; Márquez-Acero, Lambkin & Lamas, 2020

Type species
- Anthrax proserpina Wiedemann, 1828

Species
- 21 species (see text)

Synonyms
- Velocia Coquillett, 1886 (invalid)

Genus of flies

Nyia is a genus of bee flies in the family Bombyliidae. They occur in the Americas. The genus was split off Ligyra in 2020, representing the New World species of the former, more broadly defined Ligyra.

The genus name means "gold" and is derived from the Muisca language (muysccubun) of the indigenous Muisca people from the Cordillera Oriental of Colombia. It refers to the different tonalities of yellow, gold, silver, and copper seen in the body integument and vestiture of these flies.

== Species ==
There are 21 accepted species:

- Nyia alacer (Painter, 1969)
- Nyia bizona (Walker, 1850)
- Nyia cerberus (Fabricius, 1794)
- Nyia dido (Osten Sacken, 1886)
- Nyia evansi (Painter, 1969)
- Nyia fenestella (Wiedemann, 1828)
- Nyia fenestralis (Wiedemann, 1830)
- Nyia flavosparsa (Bigot, 1892)
- Nyia gazophylax (Loew, 1869)
- Nyia guerinii (Macquart, 1846)
- Nyia harpyia (Wiedemann, 1828)
- Nyia hela (Erichson, 1849)
- Nyia klugii (Wiedemann, 1830)
- Nyia latreillei (Wiedemann, 1830)
- Nyia maracaensis (Lamas & Couri, 1995)
- Nyia orcus (Walker, 1849)
- Nyia pilatei (Macquart, 1846)
- Nyia prometheus (Macquart, 1855)
- Nyia proserpina (Wiedemann, 1828)
- Nyia stymphalis (Wiedemann, 1828)
- Nyia trifigurata (Walker, 1860)
