= Blasphemers' Maledictions =

Studio album by Azarath
- Released: 29 June 2011
- Recorded: January–February, April 2011, Hertz Studio, Białystok, Poland
- Genre: Death metal, blackened death metal
- Length: 45:09
- Label: Witching Hour Productions
- Producer: Zbigniew "Inferno" Promiński, Sławomir Wiesławski, Wojciech Wiesławski

Azarath chronology
Praise the Beast (2009)	Blasphemers' Maledictions (2011)	In Extremis (2017)

Professional ratings
Review scores
Source	Rating
Wirtualna Polska	favorable

Blasphemers' Maledictions is the fifth studio album by Polish death metal band Azarath. It was released on 29 June 2011 by Witching Hour Productions. The album was recorded between January, February and April 2011 at Hertz Studio in Białystok, Poland, and was produced by Zbigniew "Inferno" Promiński, Sławomir Wiesławski and Wojciech Wiesławski.

The album was preceded by the 7-inch EP Holy Possession, which was released on 10 April 2011.

== Track listing ==
All music composed by Bart and Inferno. All lyrics written by Necrosodom.

No.	Title	Length
1.	"Arising the Black Flame"	00:04
2.	"Supreme Reign of Tiamat"	03:58
3.	"Crushing Hammer of the Antichrist"	04:00
4.	"Firebreath of Blasphemy and Scorn"	04:15
5.	"Behold the Satan's Sword"	03:46
6.	"Under the Will of the Lord"	06:13
7.	"The Abjection"	04:24
8.	"Deathstorms Raid the Earth"	04:28
9.	"Lucifer's Rising"	03:38
10.	"Holy Possession"	04:16
11.	"Harvester of Flames"	06:07
Total length:		45:09

== Credits ==
Azarath

- Marek "Necrosodom" Lechowski – vocals, lead guitar
- Bartłomiej "Bart" Szudek – rhythm guitar, lead guitar
- Piotr "P." Ostrowski – bass guitar
- Zbigniew "Inferno" Promiński – drums, additional guitars, producing

Production

- Wojciech and Sławomir Wiesławscy – sound engineering, producing, mixing
- Zbigniew Bielak – cover art and layout
- Agnieszka Krysiuk, Konrad Adam Mickiewicz – photography
