= Scream of the Mourning Star =

Studio album by Lost Soul
- Released: November 20, 2000
- Recorded: May–June 1999 at Fonoplastikon Studio, Wrocław, Poland
- Genre: Technical death metal
- Length: 34:16
- Label: Metal Mind, Relapse
- Producer: Lost Soul

Lost Soul chronology
Scream of the Mourning Star (2000)	Übermensch (Death of God) (2000)

Professional ratings
Review scores
Source	Rating
AllMusic	2.5/5 stars

Scream of the Mourning Star is the debut album by Polish death metal band Lost Soul. It was released on November 20, 2000.

== Track listing ==
All music is composed by Lost Soul

No.	Title	Lyrics	Length
1.	"My Kingdom"	Adam Sierżęga	3:11
2.	"Divine Satisfaction"	Sierżęga	2:48
3.	"Tabernaculum Miser"	Sierżęga, Jacek Grecki	3:49
4.	"The Highest Pleasure"	Sierżęga	2:38
5.	"Malediction"	Sierżęga	3:03
6.	"Entrance to the Nothingness"	Sierżęga	3:24
7.	"We Want God"	Sierżęga	2:26
8.	"Nameless"	Sierżęga	3:51
9.	"An Eternal Sleep"	Sierżęga	3:11
10.	"Unclean"	Sierżęga	5:56
Total length:			34:16

== Personnel ==
Lost Soul

- Jacek Grecki – vocals, lead guitar
- Piotr Ostrowski – guitar
- Krzysztof Artur Zagórowicz – bass
- Adam Sierżęga – drums

Production

- Marcin Bors – engineering
- Bartek Straburzyński – engineering
- Wiesław Fatyga – photography
- GRAAL – cover design, layout
