= Eritis sicut Deus; Verbum Diaboli Manet in Aeternum; Vox Vespertilio Act I – Moon Var Dies Irae =

Studio album by Devilish Impressions
- Released: 2002
- Recorded: Autumn 2002; D.J. Wołkos 666 Studio; Opole, Poland
- Genre: Black metal Symphonic black metal Avant-garde metal Blackened death metal
- Length: 45:57
- Producer: Self-released

Devilish Impressions chronology
| Eritis sicut Deus; Verbum Diaboli Manet in Aeternum; Vox Vespertilio Act I – Moon Var Dies Irae (2002) | Plurima Mortis Imago (2005) |

Eritis sicut Deus; Verbum Diaboli Manet in Aeternum; Vox Vespertilio Act I – Moon Var Dies Irae is the first demo by the Polish avant-garde black metal band Devilish Impressions. This is the first demo they released as a band after the band members joined forces in 2000. The musical arrangements were still of low quality and the vocals are barely hearable on this demo. But the band had a pretty good idea what they were doing and whereto they wanted to evolve as a band. Some of the elements used in this demo can be traced back in their following first and debut album Plurima Mortis Imago. Devilish Impressions is known for their lengthy songs, but the demo is known for having the most lengthy songs of all their work so far.

== Track listing ==
1. "Moon" - 19:52
2. "Var" - 14:26
3. "Dies Irae" - 11:39

Total playtime: 45:57 minutes.

== Personnel ==
- Przemyslaw "Quazarre" Olbryt - vocals, guitar, synthesizers
- Turquoissa - synthesizers
- Starash - guitar

== Guest appearance ==
- Paweł Wołczyk - drums, programming, bass guitar
