= Trücizna =

Studio album by Witchmaster
- Released: 10 April 2009
- Genre: black metal
- Length: 29:49
- Label: Agonia Records (EU), Ibex Moon Records (US)
- Producer: Witchmaster

Witchmaster chronology
Witchmaster (2004)	Trücizna (2009)	Antichristus ex utero (2014)

Professional ratings
Review scores
Source	Rating
Allmusic	3.5/5 stars
About.com	3.5/5 stars
Blistering	8/10 stars
Exclaim!	favorable

Trücizna is the fourth studio album by the Polish black metal band Witchmaster. It was released on 10 April 2009 through Agonia Records.

== Track list ==
No.	Title	Length
1.	"Trücizna"	02:46
2.	"Self-inflicted Divinity"	03:18
3.	"Total Annihilation"	04:58
4.	"Road to Treblinka"	04:32
5.	"Two-point Suicide"	03:20
6.	"Back to the Bunker"	03:28
7.	"Bred in Captivity"	03:14
8.	"Black Scum"	04:13
9.	"Troops of Doom" (Sepultura cover)	02:39

== Personnel ==
Witchmaster

- Sebastian "Bastis" Grochowiak - vocals
- Tomasz "Reyash" Rejek - vocals, bass guitar
- Krzysztof "Kali" Włodarski - vocals, guitars
- Sebastian "Basti" Łuszczek - drums

Production

- Christophe Szpajdel - logo
- Katarzyna Kusztelak - cover art
- Janusz Bryt - mixing, mastering
