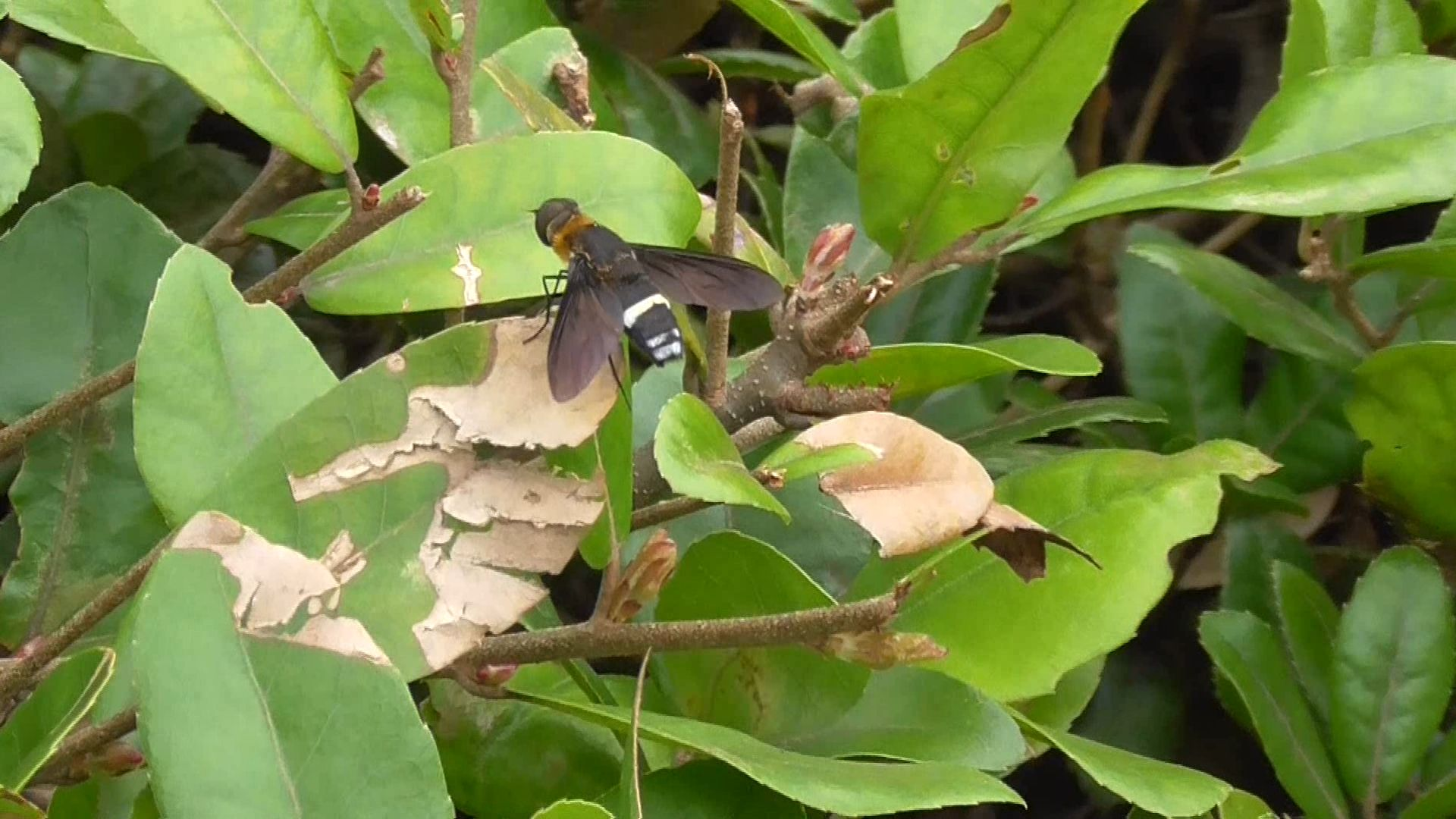
- Ligyra tantalus in Japan

Scientific classification
- Domain: Eukaryota
- Kingdom: Animalia
- Phylum: Arthropoda
- Class: Insecta
- Order: Diptera
- Family: Bombyliidae
- Subfamily: Anthracinae
- Tribe: Exoprosopini
- Genus: Ligyra; Newman, 1841

Type species
- Anthrax bombyliiformis Macleay

= Ligyra =

Genus of flies

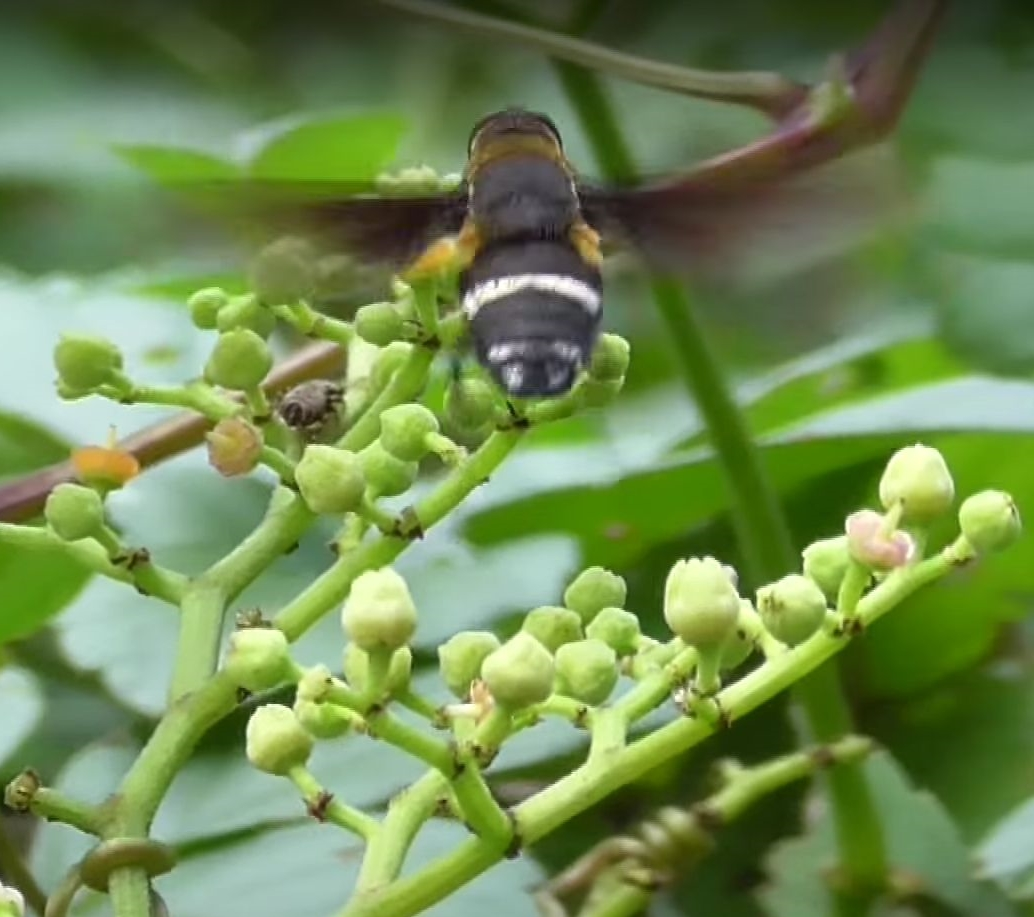
Ligyra tantalus

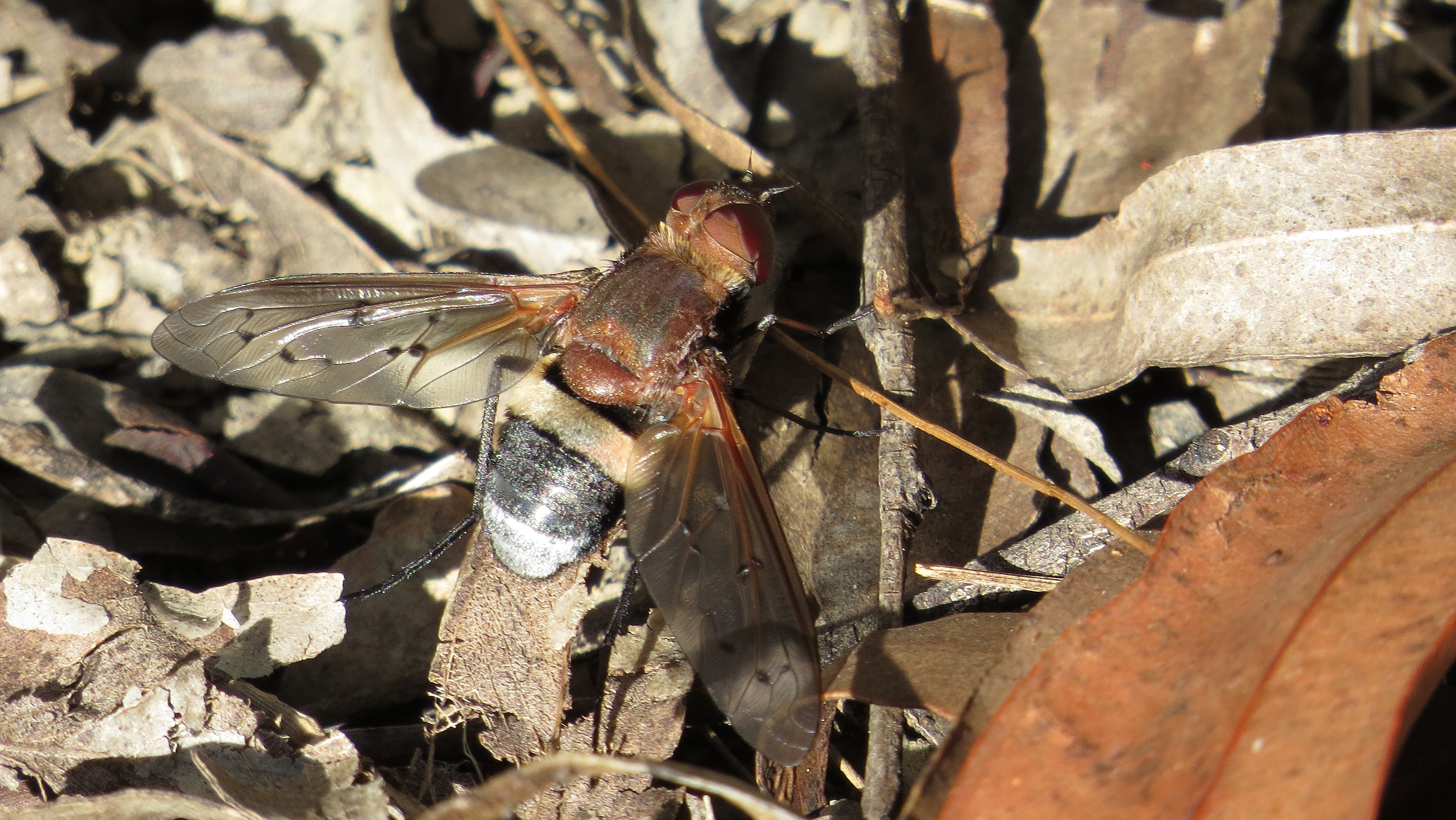
Ligyra punctipennis

Ligyra is a genus of bee flies in the Bombyliidae family. It was described by Edward Newman in 1841. There are at least 110 described species in Ligyra.

== See also ==
- List of Ligyra species
