= Tomasz Rejek =

Polish black metal musician (born 1974)

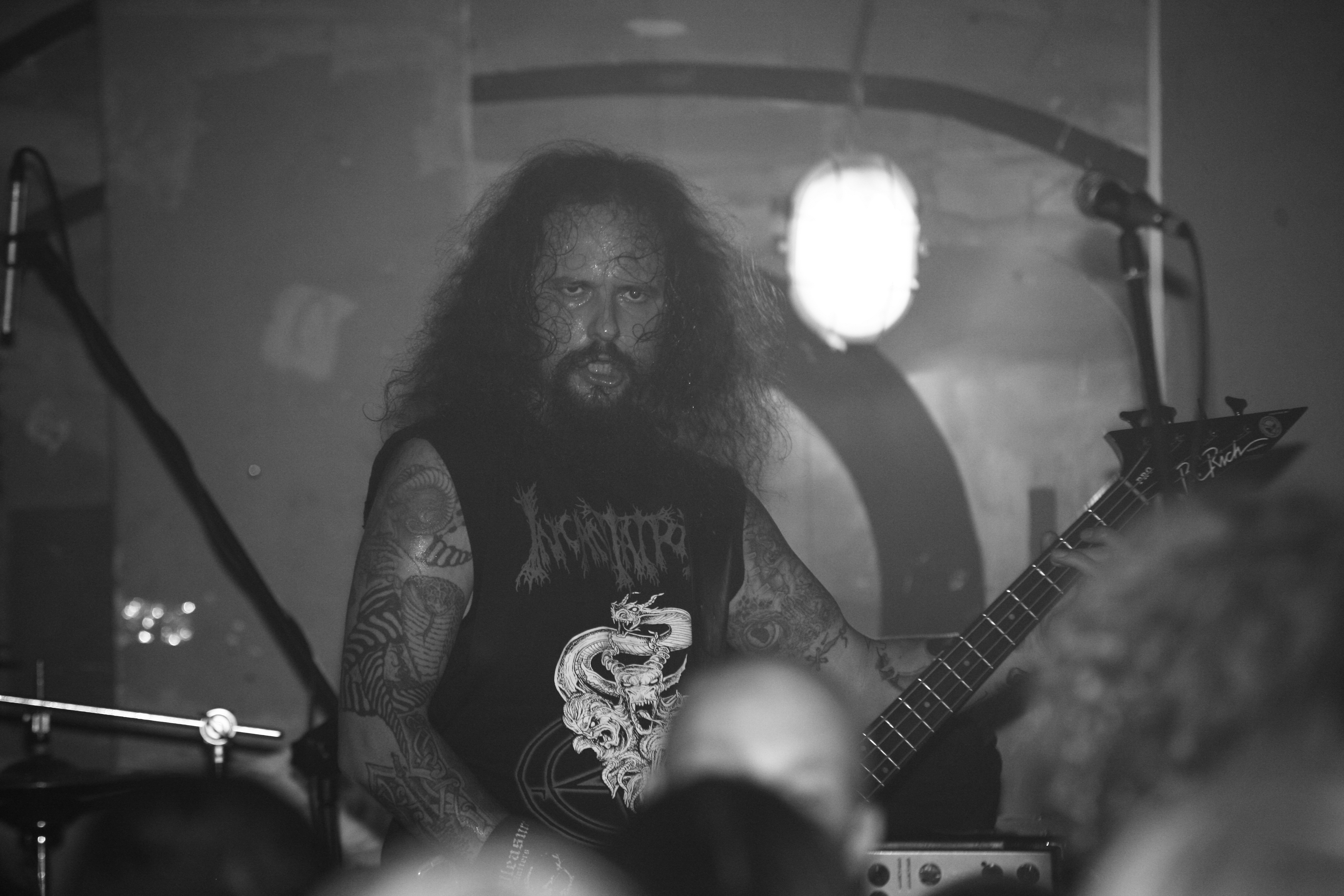
- Rejek in 2008
- Born: 5 December 1974 (age 51); Zielona Góra, Poland
- Education: University of Zielona Góra
- Occupations: Musician, singer
- Musical career
- Also known as: Reyash, Lord Reyash
- Genres: Death metal, black metal
- Instruments: Bass guitar, vocals

Tomasz "Reyash" Rejek (br 5 December 1974) is a Polish black metal musician. He is a bassist, and vocalist known for his contribution to the bands Vader, Supreme Lord, Profanum, Christ Agony, Incantation, and Witchmaster. He graduated in marketing and management at the University of Zielona Góra.

== Discography ==
Profanum

- Under the Black Wings of Emperor (Demo, 1994)
- Flowers of Our Black Misanthropy (1996, Astral Wings)
- Misantropiae Floris (2002, Pagan Records)

Witchmaster

- No Peace at All (Demo, 1997)
- Violence and Blasphemy (2000, Pagan Records)
- Witchmaster (2004, Agonia Records)
- Trücizna (2009, Agonia Records)
- Sex Drugs and Natural Selection (EP, 2009, Iron Blood And Death Corp)
- Śmierć (EP, 2012, Witching Hour Productions)
- Antichristus ex utero (2014, Osmose Productions)

Vader

- Necropolis (2009, Nuclear Blast, DVD only)

Supreme Lord

- At the Black Moon Night (Demo, 1995)
- Metal Forever (Demo, 2000)
- Death Metal Beast (Demo, 2003)
- Two Tales of Terror (2003, Time Before Time Records)
- X99.9 (2004, Conquer Records)
- Legion of Doom (EP, 2007, Gruft Produktion)
- Father Kaos (2011, Witching Hour Productions)

Christ Agony

- Christ Agony (2005, Agonia Records)
- Demonology (EP, 2007, Razor Productions)
- Condemnation (2008, Razor Productions)
- NocturN (2011, Mystic Production)
