= Pagan Records =

Polish metal record label

- Founded: 1992
- Founder: Tomasz Krajewski
- Genre: Heavy metal; extreme metal
- Country of origin: Poland
- Location: Świecie

Pagan Records is an independent extreme metal record label based in Poland. Their roster includes bands such as Azarath, Behemoth, and Christ Agony, among others.

== Bands ==
- Azarath
- Behemoth
- Christ Agony
- Furia
- Lux Occulta
- Profanum
- Trauma
