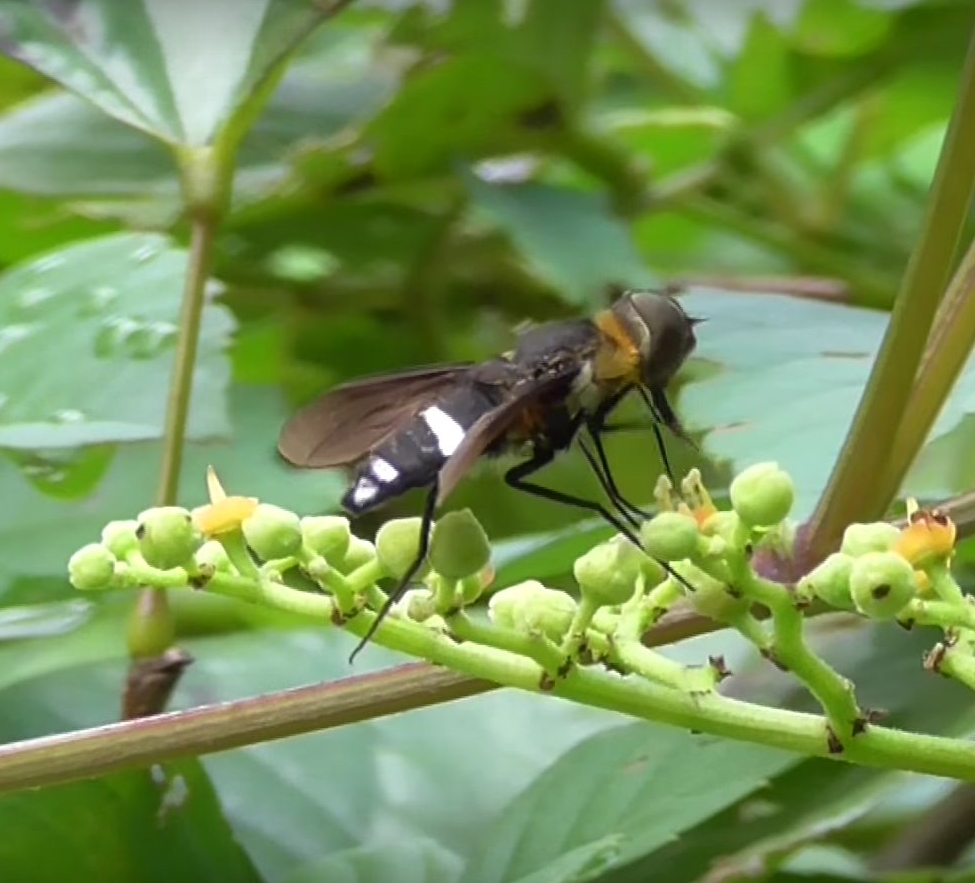
- Ligyra bee fly (Ligyra tantalus) in Japan

Scientific classification
- Kingdom: Animalia
- Phylum: Arthropoda
- Clade: Pancrustacea
- Class: Insecta
- Order: Diptera
- Family: Bombyliidae
- Genus: Ligyra
- Species: L. tantalus

Binomial name
- Ligyra tantalus (Fabricius, 1794)

= Ligyra tantalus =

Species of bee fly

Ligyra tantalus is a species of insect in the family Bombyliidae, commonly known as bee flies. It has an orange and brown thorax and a black abdomen with a white ring and four spots on it, although the rearmost two spots can be joined together in some specimens. The wings are purplish-black and swept back from the body when at rest.

== Distribution ==
It is found in Asia in areas such as China (mainland) and Hong Kong, Indonesia, Japan, the Philippines (Palawan), Taiwan, and Thailand and also in Australia.

Ligyra tantalus feeding on bushkiller (Cayratia japonica) in Japan

Ligyra bee fly (Ligyra tantalus) in Tokyo

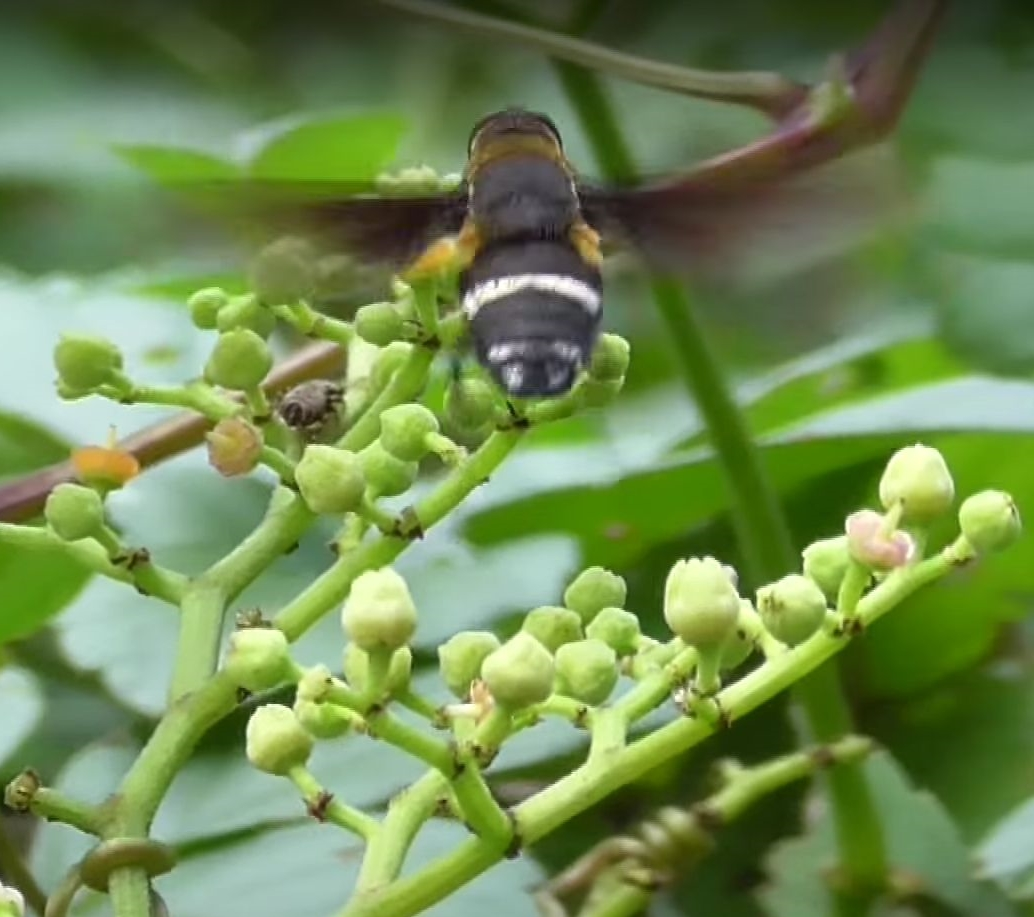
Rear view of Ligyra tantalus

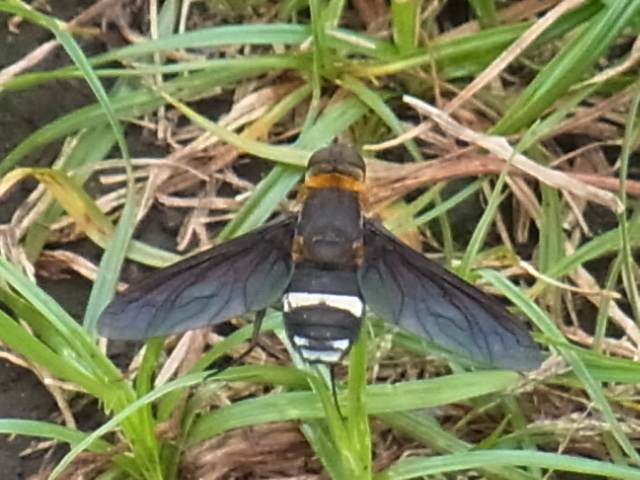
Ligyra tantalus in Japan
