= Lost Soul (band) =

Polish technical death metal band

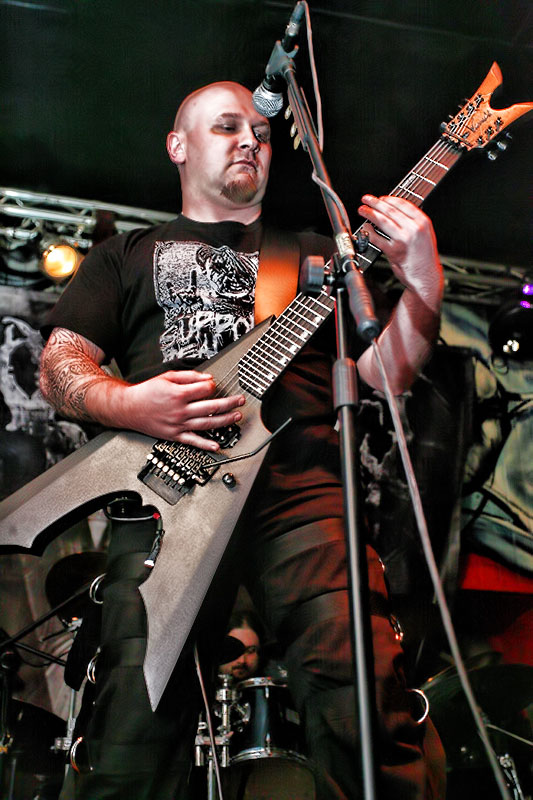
- Jacek Grecki during the concert in Madness club - Wrocław, 20 April 2010.

Background information
- Origin: Wrocław, Poland
- Genre: Technical death metal
- Years active: 1990–1995, 1997–present
- Labels: Relapse Records, Metal Mind Productions, Osmose Productions, Empire Records, Wicked World Records, Earache Records, Witching Hour Productions
- Members: Jacek Grecki; Damian "Czajnik" Czajkowski; Asmodeus Draco Dux; Marek Gołaś
- Past members: (see below)
- Website: www.lostsoul.pl

Lost Soul is a Polish technical death metal band founded in 1990 in Wrocław. Lost Soul has released five studio albums that have been acclaimed by fans and critics. The band's 2009 album, Immerse in Infinity, was promoted with a video, the band's first, for the song "...If The Dead Can Speak".

== History ==
The band was formed in 1990 in Wrocław by singer and guitar player Jacek Grecki, bass player Tomasz Fornalski, and drummer Adam Sierżęga. They recorded their first songs two years later and released them as the demo Eternal Darkness. Another demo, Superior Ignotum, recorded in Fors Studio in Czech Republic, came out in 1993. In 1995, Lost Soul signed with Baron Records label. They re-recorded Superior Ignotum with two bonus tracks from their first recording. The band became inactive soon after due to personal disagreements.

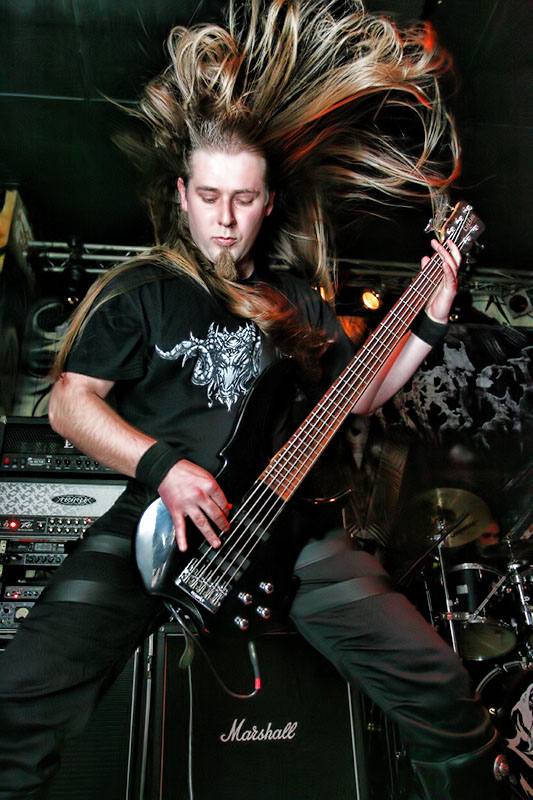
Damian "Czajnik" Czajkowski during the concert in Madness club - Wrocław, 20 April 2010.

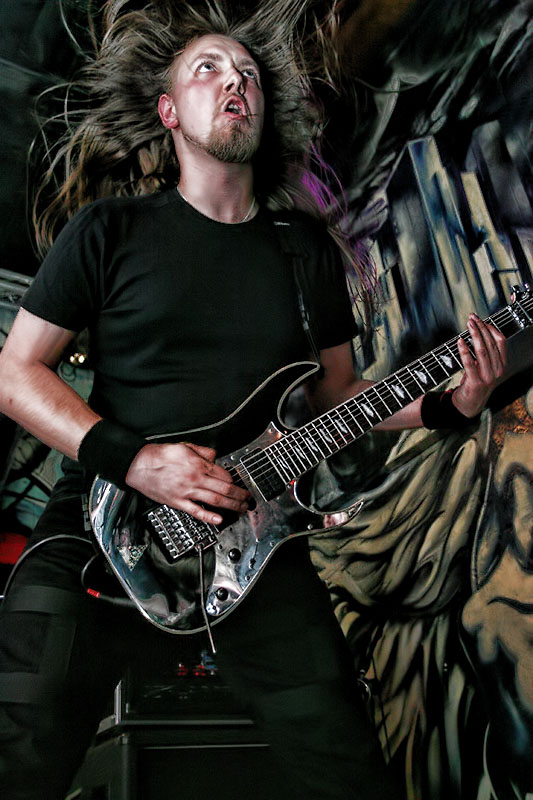
Dominik "Domin" Prykiel during the concert in Madness club - Wrocław, 20 April 2010.

In 1997, Lost Soul returned with guitarist Piotr Ostrowski. The following year, they entered Selani Studio in Olsztyn to record the demo ...Now is Forever. Soon after, Tomasz Fornalski left the band and was replaced with Krzysztof Artur Zagórowicz (also in Shemhamforash). At that time, Lost Soul played with Dying Fetus, Monstrosity, and Kataklysm, and appeared on such festivals as Obscene Extreme Festival and Silesian Open Air. In 1999, ...Now is Forever was released on Disco's Out, Slaughter's In compilation released by Novum Vox Mortis records and on Polish Assault released by Relapse Records one year later.

In 2000, the debut album, Scream of the Mourning Star, was released in Poland by Metal Mind Records and worldwide via Relapse Records. The album was well received by critics and fans. Two years later, in May 2002, Lost Soul signed with Empire Records for the release of their second album, Übermensch (Death of God), released in August. Several months later, Osmose Productions released it worldwide.

In October 2002, Lost Soul took part in the Thrash'em All Festival, playing with Monstrosity, Vomitory, Trauma, Dissenter, Sceptic and Contempt. Soon after, Krzysztof Artur Zagórowicz left the band for personal reasons. Paweł Michałowski took over bass. Lost Soul played Hell Festival with KAT and Ancient Rites, among others. They went on another tour in 2003, with Hell-Born and Quo Vadis. They appeared on the Metalmania Festival with Samael, Marduk, Vader, Saxon and Malevolent Creation.

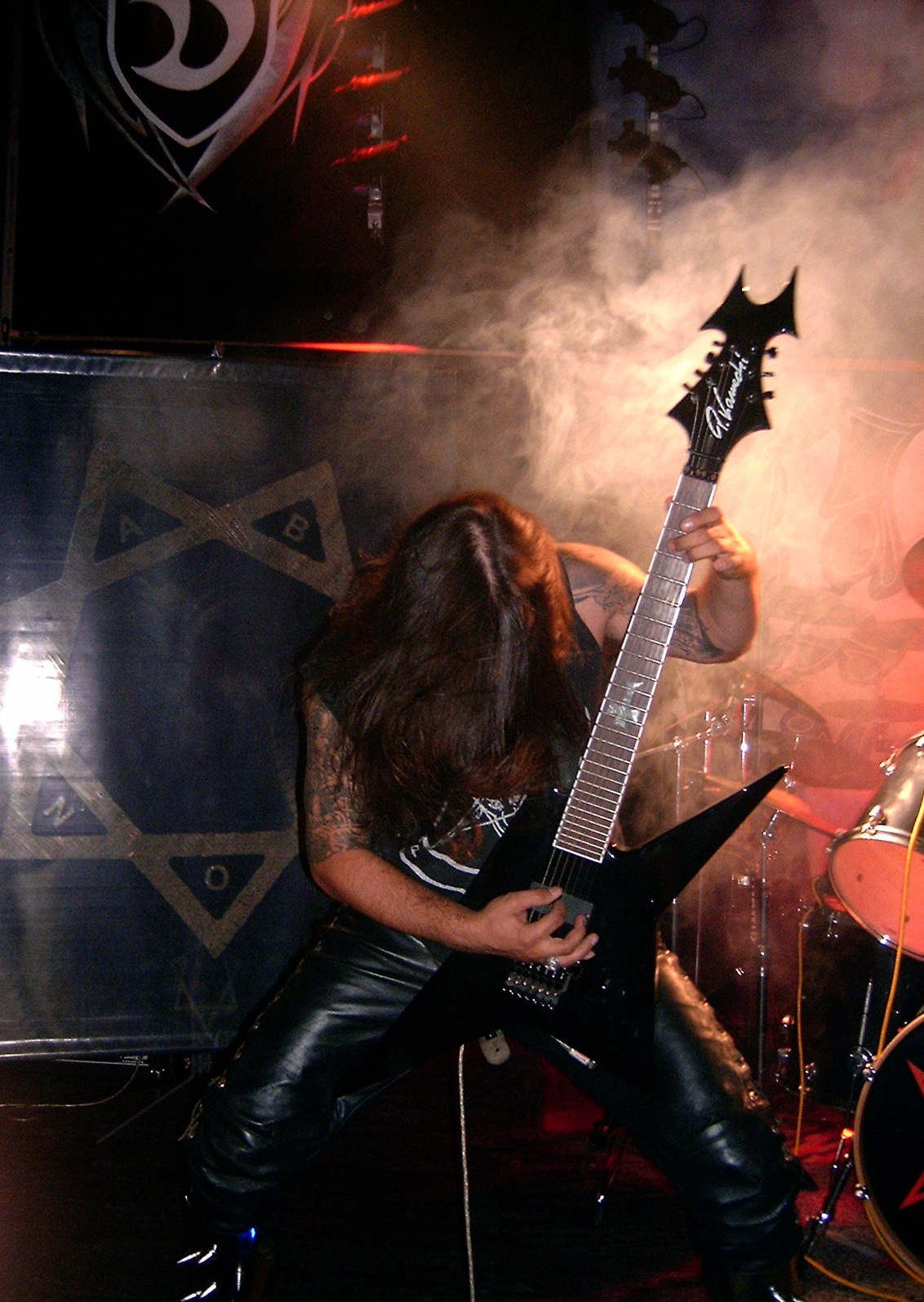
Piotr Ostrowski - former Lost Soul's guitar player during the concert, 11 September 2005.

On 3 March 2003, Übermensch (Death of God) was released worldwide and Lost Soul embarked on the Empire Invasion Tour with Dies Irae, Hate and Esqarial. After that tour, Paweł Michałowski left the band and was replaced with returning member Tomasz Fornalski. In April 2004, this line-up recorded the third full length album, Chaostream, at Hertz Studio. Lost Soul used seven-string guitars during recordings. In July, Tomasz Fornalski quit and was replaced with Damian "Czajnik" Czajkowski. In October, Lost Soul took part in the Blitzkrieg II tour with Vader, CETI and Crionics.

Chaostream was released in 2005, via Wicked World Records (Earache Records sublabel). Greek artist Seth Siro Anton designed the cover. The album was promoted on three tours. First was the Mega Strike Europe in Chaos Tour during April and May 2005 with Fleshgore and Sanatorium. Then followed the Summer Tour 2005 with Vader and Desecreation. The third tour was Blitzkrieg III, spanning 48 cities in Poland and Europe. Lost Soul shared the stage with Anorexia Nervosa, Rotting Christ and Vader.

In 2006, Adam Sierżęga and Piotr Ostrowski left the band. In 2008, the band returned with Krzysztof "Desecrate" Szałkowski on drums (also in Naamah, Pyorrhoea and Gortal). At the beginning of 2009, second guitar player Dominik "Domin" Prykiel completed the line-up. Lost Soul started working on the fourth album, Immerse in Infinity. This album was released on 6 October 2009 by Witching Hour Productions. The band recorded a promotional videoclip for the song "...If The Dead Can Speak". The band took part in Blitzkrieg V tour for two concerts with Vader and Marduk, presenting new songs from the album Immerse in Infinity.

In 2010, Lost Souls toured as a special guest on 11 concerts of the Aealo Tour with Rotting Christ. During summer, the band played several open-air festivals, including XV Brutal Assault in Czech Republic, and played some separate concerts supporting Bolt Thrower and Gojira. In December 2010, Lost Soul celebrated their 20th anniversary with a special show under the moniker Genesis - XX Years Of ChaoZ in Madness club in Wrocław. This performance announced the compilation album of the same name. Lost Soul played with such acts as Trauma, Hermh, Crionics, Gortal, Extinct Gods and F.A.M.

== Band members ==
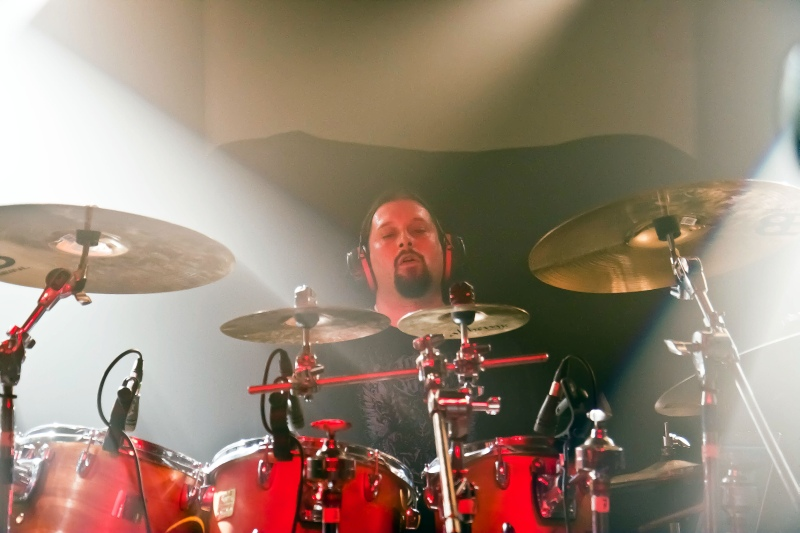
Krzysztof "Desecrate" Szałkowski during the concert in Loch Ness club - Kraków, 26 August 2010

Current members

- Jacek Grecki – vocals, guitar (1990–1995, 1997–present)
- Rafał Przewłocki – bass (2017–present)
- Michał Włosik – guitar (2017–present)

Former members

- Adam Sierżęga – drums (1990–1995, 1997–2006)
- Tomasz Fornalski – bass (1990–1995, 1997–1998, 2003–2004)
- Piotr Ostrowski – guitar (1997–2006)
- Krzysztof Artur Zagórowicz – bass (1998–2002)
- Paweł Michałowski – bass (2002–2003)
- Damian "Czajnik" Czajkowski – bass (2005–2016)
- Krzysztof "Desecrate" Szałkowski – drums (2008–2012)
- Dominik "Domin" Prykiel – guitar (2009–2012)
- Paweł "Paul" Jaroszewicz – drums (2012)
- Marek Gołaś – guitar (2012–2016)
- Asmodeus Draco Dux – drums (2012–2016)
- Rafał Miedziński – drums (2017–2018)

Timeline

== Discography ==
=== Studio albums ===
- Scream of the Mourning Star (2000)
- Übermensch (Death of God) (2002)
- Chaostream (2005)
- Immerse in Infinity (2009)
- Atlantis: The New Beginning (2015)

=== Demos ===
- Eternal Darkness (1993)
- Superior Ignotum (1994)
- ...Now Is Forever (1998)

=== Compilations ===
- Genesis - XX Years of ChaoZ (2013)

=== Splits ===
- Disco's Out, Slaughter's In (1999)
- Polish Assault (2000)

=== Videos ===
- "...If The Dead Can Speak" (2009, Directed by: Endorfina)

== Awards ==
Year	Category	Award	Note
2010	Best album (Immerse in Infinity)	Musicarena.pl summary, 2009	2nd place
2011	The Artist of 2010 - Poland	Metalnews.pl plebiscite, 2010	2nd place
