= Trauma (Polish band) =

Polish death metal band

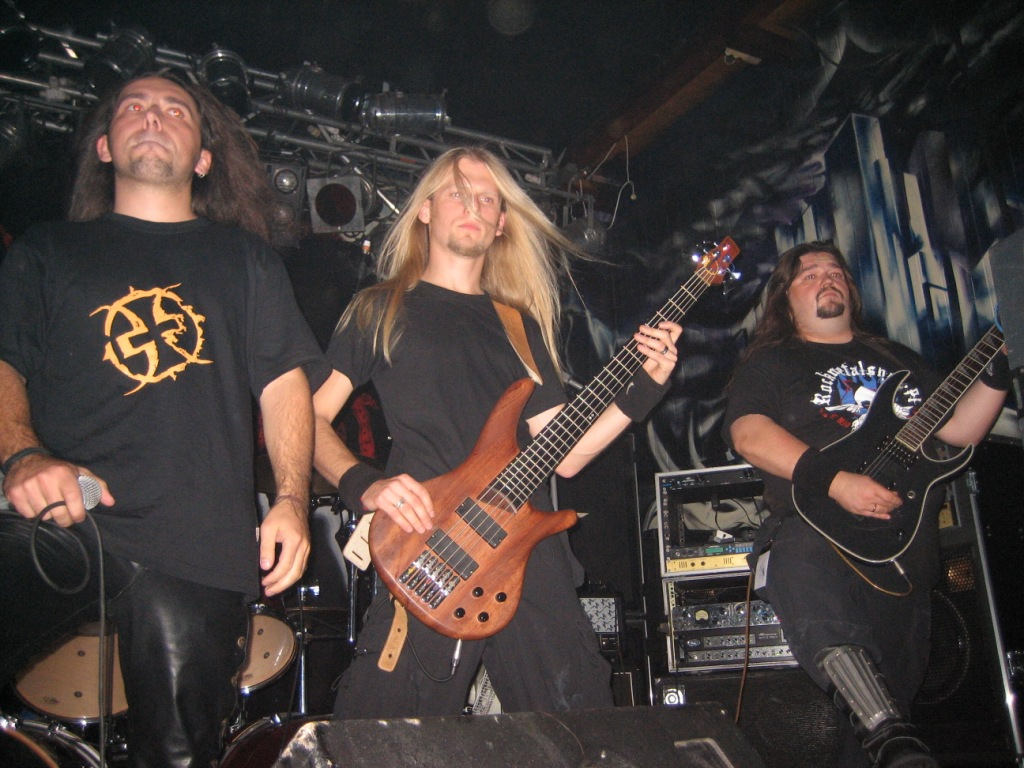
- Trauma during a concert in 2006 (From left: Robert Jarymowicz, Paul Krajnik, Chris "Dino" Wojdas)

Background information
- Origin: Poland
- Genres: Death metal, Speed metal
- Years active: 1986–present
- Labels: Pagan Records, Empire Records
- Website: http://trauma.art.pl

Trauma (formerly Thanatos) is a Polish death metal band formed in 1986 in Elbląg. Trauma has ranked among the top bands in the Polish death metal scene.

== Members ==
Current line-up

- Arkadiusz "Mały" Sinica – drums
- Jarosław "Mister" Misterkiewicz – guitars
- Artur "Chudy" Chudewniak – vocals

Former members

- Piotr Zienkiewicz – bass, vocals
- Jacek "Skocz" Holewa – vocals
- Arkadiusz Furdal – guitars
- Paweł Kapla – bass
- Paweł "Firana" Krajnik – bass
- Patryk "Patrix" Krajnik – guitars, vocals
- Filip "Fill" Musiatowicz – guitars
- Robert "Kopeć" Jarymowicz – vocals
- Dawid "Davidian" Rutkowski – bass
- Andrzej "Wasyl" Wasiukiewicz – drums
- Zbigniew Kunicki – guitars
- Wojciech "Bubi" Sukow – bass, vocals
- Bartek "Winiar" Winiarski – vocals

Current live members

- Tomek Myśliński – bass
- Krzysztof "Dziadek" Dobrowolski – bass, guitars

Former live members

- Paweł "Pery" Perwejnis – bass
- Przemysław Ozga – guitars
- Konrad Rossa – guitars
- Krystian "Dino" Wojdas – guitars

== Discography ==
=== As Thanatos ===
- Deo Optimo Maximo (DEMO) - 1989
- Out of Sanity (DEMO) - 1990

=== As Trauma ===
- Invisible Reality (DEMO) - 1992
- Comedy Is Over - 1996
- Daimonion - 1998
- Suffocated In Slumber - 2000
- Crash Test (LIVE) - 2001
- Imperfect Like A God - 2003
- Determination - 2005
- Hamartia (EP) - 2006
- Neurotic Mass - 2007
- Archetype of Chaos - 2010
- Karma Obscura - 2013
- Ominous Black - 2020

== Sources ==
- https://web.archive.org/web/20100725072343/http://www.trauma.art.pl/index.php/en
- http://www.metalstorm.net/bands/band.php?band_id=1193&bandname=Trauma
