= Christ Agony =

Polish black metal band

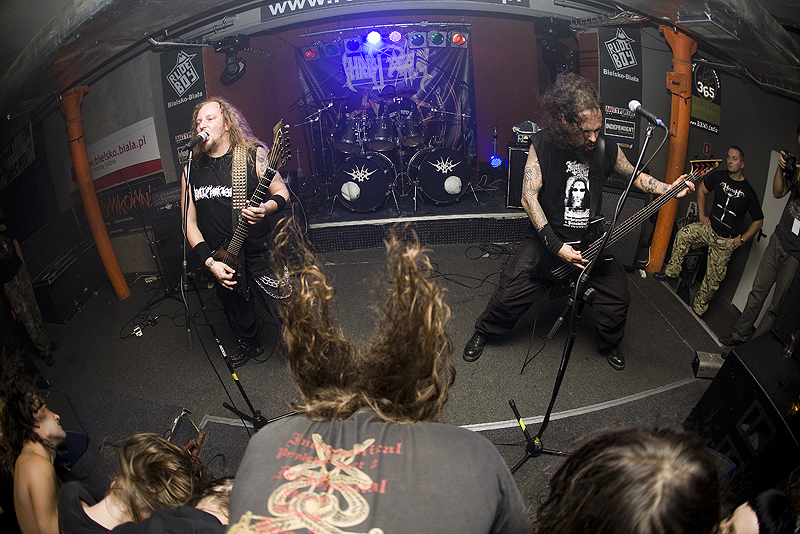
- Christ Agony, 2008

Background information
- Origin: Morąg, Poland
- Genres: Black metal
- Years active: 1990-2003, 2005-2007, 2007-present
- Labels: Baron Records, Carnage Records, Adipocere Records, Croon Records, Cacophonous Records, Hammerheart Records, Morbid Noizz Productions, Metal Mind Records, Pagan Records, Apocalypse Productions, Agonia Records, Razor Productions, Faithless Production, Mystic Production
- Website: myspace.com/christagonyofficial

Christ Agony is a Polish black metal band from Morąg, formed in 1990. Due to legal problems between 2005-2007 Christ Agony performed under the name Union.

== Band members ==
Current members

- Cezary "Cezar" Augustynowicz – guitar, vocals (1990–2003, 2005–2007, 2007-)

Past members

- Michał "Armagog" Samol - bass guitar (2017)
- Tomasz "Reyash" Rejek – bass guitar, vocals (2000–2003, 2005–2007, 2007-)
- Dariusz "Młody" Płaszewski – drums (2005–2006, 2012-)
- Marek "G-Hatt" Banaszewski – guitar (2000-2001)
- Andrzej "Ash" Get – bass guitar, vocals (1990–1995)
- Maurycy "Mauser" Stefanowicz – bass guitar (1995–1997)
- Jarosław "Blackie" Mielczarek – bass guitar, vocals (1997–2000)
- Piotr "Mścisław" Bajus – bass guitar, vocals (2010)
- Adam "Żurek" Żuromski – drums (1990–1995)
- Maciej "Gilan" Liszewski – drums (1995–1998)
- Krzysztof "Docent" Raczkowski – drums (session, 1998, 1999)
- Przemysław "Thoarinus" Wojewoda – drums (1998–2000)
- Bartek "Bart" Baranowski – drums (session, 1999)
- Witold "Vitold" Domański – drums (2000)
- Krzysztof "Zaala" Zalewski – drums (2000–2003, 2011)
- Alex von Poschinger – drums (2006–2007)
- Łukasz "Icanraz" Sarnacki – drums (2007–2009)
- Krzysztof "Vizun" Saran – drums (2009–2010)
- Dariusz "Hellrizer" Zaborowski – drums (2008, 2010–2011)
- Zbigniew "Inferno" Promiński – drums (session, 2011)
- Paweł "Paul" Jaroszewicz – drums (2011-2012)

== Discography ==
- Sacronocturn (1990, Demo)
- Epitaph of Christ (1992, Demo, Carnage Records)
- Unholyunion (1993, Baron Records)
- Daemoonseth - Act II (1994, Adipocere Records)
- Faithless (1995, Compilation, Baron Records)
- Moonlight - Act III (1996, Croon Records, Cacophonous Records)
- Darkside (1997, Hammerheart Records, Morbid Noizz Productions)
- Trilogy (1998, Pagan Records)
- Elysium (1999, Metal Mind Records)
- Moonlight Act III / Darkside (2000, Compilation, Apocalypse Productions)
- Unholyunion / Daemoonseth Act II (2000, Compilation, Pagan Records)
- Live - Apocalypse (2002, Apocalypse Productions)
- Christ Agony (2005, as Union, Agonia Records)
- Demonology (EP, 2007, Razor Productions)
- Condemnation (2008, Razor Productions)
- UnholyDeaMoon (2010, Compilation, Faithless Production)
- NocturN (2011, Mystic Production)
