= Vincent Castiglia =

American painter and tattoo artist

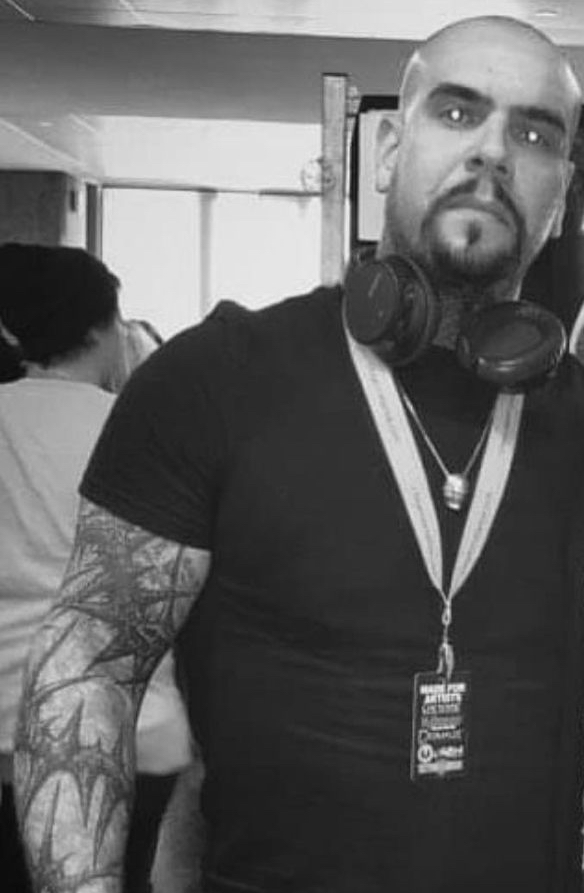
Castiglia in 2017

Vincent Castiglia (born April 8, 1982 in Brooklyn, New York) is an American painter and tattoo artist. His work includes "Stings of the Lash", "Remedy for the Living" and "As Gods".

== Personal life ==
Castiglia describes his paintings as crystallizations of his experiences, freed from the psyche. He derives his inspiration from his personal experiences which categorizes his work as allegorical. Vincent, in the privacy of his studio, practices a kind of modern day phlebotomy, siphoning the life force which contains his own psychic energy and transforms it into a creative outlet. His work is heavily focused on the symbiosis of birth and death, the transience of human beings the pitfalls of mortality and mysticism. Castiglia has credited his 2009 album art for Triptykon as "a project of enormous depth for me, conceptually as well as visually. I think the resonance between Triptykon's music, Giger's art and my work is extremely powerful, and it coalesces in quite an amazing, and singular way." Castiglia designed a specially created portrait of the members of the group, painted in his own blood. Singer and guitarist Tom Gabriel Fischer commended Vincent's work for Triptykon's album Eparistera Daimones and has expressed that he feels "infinitely grateful that he has lent us his incredible talent, not least because I know he incorporates as much passion, darkness and pain into his work as I do, too." On his work being having been exclusively painted in human blood, Castiglia has said,

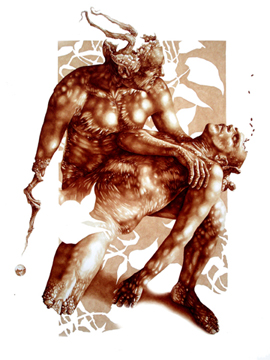
"The Sleep" Collection: Martin Eric Ain

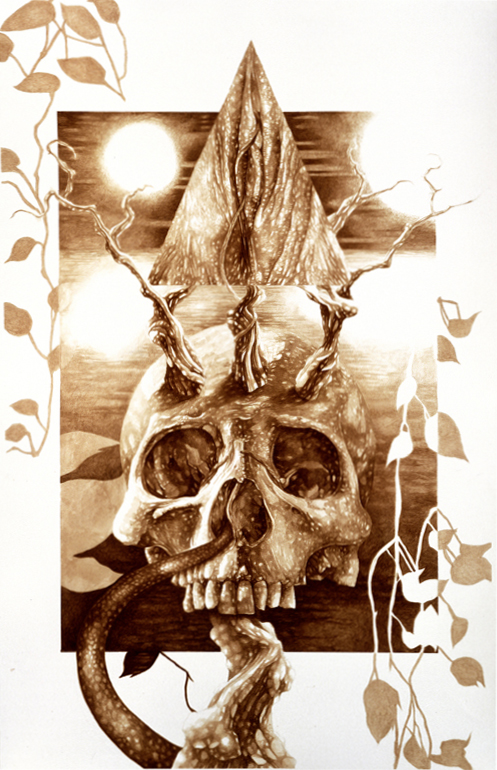
"Gravity" Collection: Gregg Allman

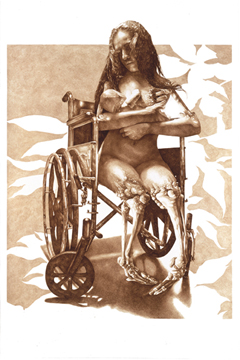
"Feeding"

I sought the most direct and personal connection with my work, one that could not lie or be reproduced. Although the paintings are often thematic, they are also quite visceral, and I believe it is because of this that the response has been so strong. The creative process is very honest and cathartic for me, and is an intermingling of feelings and experiences, aspirations and visions, all spontaneously congealing on the canvas.

== Career ==
Castiglia's paintings are described as "monochromatic tableaux examining life, death, and the human condition" on his official website. Castiglia is the first American artist to receive a solo exhibition invitation from Oscar Award-winning artist, H.R. Giger, to exhibit at the H.R. Giger Museum, in Gruyeres, Switzerland. Remedy for the Living, the 1st solo exhibition of paintings by Vincent Castiglia opened at the H.R. Giger Museum Gallery on November 1, 2008, and closed in April 2009. In 2009, Vincent painted album art for Triptykon's 2010 debut release, Eparistera Daimones. The group is founded by former Hellhammer / Celtic Frost singer and guitarist Tom Gabriel Fischer. The album's art is an amalgamation of works by HR Giger (cover art), Vincent Castiglia (interior art), and Triptykon on "Eparistera Daimones". Castiglia's works on paper have been exhibited internationally and have been hung in many distinguished collections. In 2009, "Gravity", one of his most celebrated works of 2006, was acquired by rock musician, Gregg Allman. In 2010, Castiglia's art was featured on the official poster for the MTV New Media Horror-Slasher Film, Savage County. Recently, in 2016, Castiglia painted a custom ESP electric guitar for Gary Holt of both Slayer and Exodus. This is a fully functional piece of art that is often played onstage by Gary. The Guitar, titled, "Lucifer," was painted exclusively in 18 viles of Gary's own blood. Shortly thereafter, Slayer also commissioned Castiglia to paint them a poster for their farewell tour, "Farewell". His surrealist work has been lauded by critics and has been compared to the works of artists such as Michelanglo, Damien Hirst and Francis Bacon. Another critic has said the following of his work,

In a sense, they're not paintings, they are hemorrhages.

In 2018, a documentary film directed by John Borowoski, titled "Bloodlines: The Art and Life of Vincent Castiglia", was released. This film dived into Vincent's healing process and recovery, and his artwork.

== Exhibitions ==
=== Solo exhibitions ===
==== Westchester County Center for the Arts ====
Psychocosm, Solo Exhibition, September 2014, White Plains, New York

==== Sacred Gallery ====
Resurrection, Solo Exhibition, October, 2012, New York, New York

==== Meta Gallery ====
Sacrifices For The Sanguinary Age, Solo Exhibition, September, 2010, Toronto, Canada

==== Last Rites Gallery ====
Anathema, Vincent Castiglia And Shawn Barber, December, 2008, New York, New York

==== H.R Giger Museum Gallery ====
Remedy For The Living, Solo Exhibition, November 1St, 2008 – March 2009, Gruyeres, Switzerland

=== Group exhibitions ===
==== Invitational: Tarot Under Oath ====
Last Rites Gallery, January, 2014, New York, New York

==== Invitational: Taboo ====
Last Rites Gallery, July, 2012, New York, New York

==== Invitational: The Society For Art Of Imagination ====
Phantesten Museum, March, 2012, Vienna, Austria

==== Invitational: The Damned Show ====
Hastings Ballroom / Curated By Tangent Gallery, October 2010, Detroit, Michigan

==== Invitational: Blood, Sweat, And Fears ====
Sacred Gallery, October, 2010, New York, New York

==== Invitational: The Black Plagu ====
Congregation Gallery, July, 2010, Los Angeles, California
