= Parched with Thirst Am I and Dying =

Compilation album by Celtic Frost
- Released: 16 March 1992
- Recorded: September 1985 – November 1991
- Genres: Black metal; thrash metal; avant-garde metal; gothic metal
- Length: 72:33
- Label: Noise
- Producer: Celtic Frost

Celtic Frost chronology
Vanity/Nemesis (1990)	Parched with Thirst Am I and Dying (1992)	Monotheist (2006)

Professional ratings
Review scores
Source	Rating
AllMusic	4/5 stars
Collector's Guide to Heavy Metal	8/10

Parched with Thirst Am I and Dying is a compilation album by the Swiss extreme metal band Celtic Frost, released in 1992. It consists of album tracks, demos and various other recordings of the band.

== Track listing ==
No.	Title	Writer(s)	Originally released in	Length
1.	"Idols of Chagrin" (previously unreleased)	Curt Victor Bryant, Thomas Gabriel Warrior	adapted from 1991 demo	4:10
2.	"A Descent to Babylon (Babylon Asleep)"	Martin Eric Ain, Ron Marks, Warrior	Wine in My Hand (Third from the Sun) EP (1990)	4:28
3.	"Return to the Eve" (1985 studio jam)	Ain, Warrior	Tragic Serenades EP (1986)	4:08
4.	"Juices Like Wine" (partially re-recorded and remixed in 1991)	Oliver Amberg, Bryant, Warrior	Cold Lake (1988)	4:18
5.	"The Inevitable Factor" (previously unreleased, recorded in 1987)	Ain, Reed St. Mark, Warrior		4:40
6.	"The Heart Beneath"	Bryant, Stephen Priestly, Warrior	Vanity/Nemesis (1990)	3:52
7.	"Cherry Orchards" (radio edit)	Amberg, Warrior	Cold Lake	4:04
8.	"Tristesses de la Lune"	Ain	Into the Pandemonium (1987)	3:01
9.	"Wings of Solitude"	Warrior	Vanity/Nemesis	4:40
10.	"The Usurper" (re-recorded 1986)	Warrior	Tragic Serenades	3:29
11.	"Journey into Fear" (previously unreleased, recorded in 1985)	Warrior		3:55
12.	"Downtown Hanoi" (partially re-recorded and remixed in 1991)	Amberg, Warrior	Cold Lake	4:12
13.	"Circle of the Tyrants"	Warrior	To Mega Therion (1985)	4:40
14.	"In the Chapel in the Moonlight"	Billy Hill	The Collector's Celtic Frost promo EP (1987)	2:07
15.	"I Won't Dance (The Elders Orient)" (radio edit)	Warrior	Into the Pandemonium	3:51
16.	"The Name of My Bride"	Ain, Bryant	Vanity/Nemesis	4:33
17.	"Mexican Radio" (1991 studio jam)	Marc Moreland, Stan Ridgway	Into the Pandemonium	3:25
18.	"Under Apollyon's Sun" (previously unreleased)	Bryant, Warrior	adapted from 1991 demo	5:36

== Personnel ==
Celtic Frost

- Thomas Gabriel Warrior – guitars, lead and backing vocals, effects
- Martin Eric Ain – bass (tracks 3, 5, 6, 10, 11, 13–15), backing vocals, effects
- Reed St. Mark – drums (3, 5, 10, 11, 13–15), backing vocals
- Curt Victor Bryant – bass, guitars, backing vocals
- Oliver Amberg – guitars (tracks 7, 12)
- Stephen Priestly – drums (tracks 2, 4, 6, 7, 9, 12, 16, 17), drum programming (tracks 1, 18), backing vocals
