= Sub (album) =

Studio album by Apollyon Sun
- Released: 4 April 2000
- Recorded: 1998–2000
- Genre: Industrial metal, electronica, trip hop
- Length: 44:28
- Label: Mayan
- Producer: Apollyon Sun, Roli Mosimann

Apollyon Sun chronology
God Leaves (And Dies) (1998)	Sub (2000)	Flesh (2001)

Professional ratings
Review scores
Source	Rating
Chronicles of Chaos	8.5/10

Sub is the debut album by Swiss industrial metal band Apollyon Sun, released in 2000 on Mayan Records.

The band started working on a full album, titled Sub, at London's Trident Studios in 1998, with producer Roli Mosimann (Björk, Marilyn Manson, Faith No More), who had also produced the 1990 Celtic Frost album Vanity/Nemesis. Further recording and mixing sessions took place at EastSide Sound in Manhattan, Nomis Studios in London, and at various studio locations in Switzerland. Sub features prominent final mixes by Mosimann, John Fryer (HIM, Nine Inch Nails), and Apollyon Sun themselves. Sub was released globally through Mayan Records in late summer 2000, after two years of studio work.

"Human III" is the continuation of a song developed by Tom Gabriel Fischer, following on from "Human (Intro)" from Celtic Frost's Morbid Tales (1984) and "Human II" from Celtic Frost's Cold Lake (1988). "Messiah (Second Coming)" is a remake of the Hellhammer song "Messiah", Hellhammer being one of Fischer's former bands. "Reefer Boy" and "Concrete Satan" both appeared on the God Leaves (And Dies) EP, however they were completely re-recorded for Sub. There are several unreleased songs from these sessions including "Cradle", a re-recorded version of "God Leaves" and two further instrumentals.

== Track listing ==
1. "Dweller" (Subhuman Remix) – 5:15
2. "Reefer Boy" (John Fryer Remix) – 4:55
3. "Feeder" – 4:20
4. "Messiah (Second Coming)" – 4:10
5. "Naked Underground" – 5:01
6. "Slender" – 5:43
7. "Human III" – 4:33
8. "R.U.M." – 0:56
9. "Mother Misplaced" – 5:37
10. "Concrete Satan" – 3:58
11. "The End: Leviathan" – 1:00 (hidden track)

== Personnel ==
Apollyon Sun

- Tom Gabriel Fischer – vocals, guitars
- Erol Unala – guitars, grooves
- Donovan John Szypura – programming
- Danny Zingg – bass
- Marky Edelmann – drums, synthesizer

Additional musicians

- Michelle Amar – vocals on "Slender" and "Human III"
- Kat – vocals on "Messiah (Second Coming)"
- Xavier Russell – vocals on "R.U.M."
- Gary Townsley – vocal effect on "Messiah (Second Coming)"
- Ron Marks – guitar on "Naked Underground"
- Kurt Unala – acoustic bass on "Slender"
- Roger Muller – programming
- Roli Mosimann – additional programming

Production

- Apollyon Sun – producers, mixing on "Dweller"
- Roli Mosimann – producer, mixing
- Richard Hilton – engineer
- John Fryer – mixing on "Reefer Boy"
- Gary Townsley, Laura Whittaker – mixing assistants
- Simon Heyworth – mastering at Chop 'Em Out, London
