= Melana Chasmata =

Studio album by Triptykon
- Released: 14 April 2014 (Europe); 15 April 2014 (North America)
- Recorded: November 2013 – January 2014
- Studios: Various: Woodshed Studio, Landshut, Germany; Triptykon Bunker, Zürich, Switzerland; Corinne's Place, Zürich, Switzerland
- Genre: Extreme metal
- Length: 66:52; 75:16 (Japanese)
- Labels: Prowling Death; Century Media
- Producers: V. Santura; Michael Zech; Antje Lange (exec.); Tom Warrior (exec.)

Triptykon chronology
Shatter (2010)	Melana Chasmata (2014)

Melana Chasmata is the second full-length album by Swiss extreme metal band Triptykon, released through Prowling Death Records /Century Media Records on 14 April 2014 in Europe and on 15 April 2014 in North America. The album was officially announced on 22 October 2013 by the band's frontman, Thomas Gabriel Fischer (a.k.a. "Tom Warrior"), on his official blog.

The title is in Greek (Μελανά Χάσματα) and, according to Fischer, it can be roughly translated as "black, deep depressions/valleys" — or, more literally, "chasms as [black as] ink".

The album's artwork was provided by famous Surrealist painter H. R. Giger. It is the third time in his career he has collaborated with Thomas Fischer; Giger also provided artwork for Fischer's former band Celtic Frost's first full-length, To Mega Therion, in 1985, and to Triptykon's debut Eparistera Daimones in 2010. It was Giger's last album cover before his death, just one month after the album's release.

A music video for the track "Aurorae" was released on 7 August 2014. Another video, to "Tree of Suffocating Souls", was released on 17 November 2014. Song In The Sleep of Death is referring to Emily Brontë as about a lost love.

== Reception ==
Professional ratings
Aggregate scores
Source	Rating
Metacritic	82/100 link
Review scores
Source	Rating
About.com	link
All About the Rock	link
Exclaim!	link
Kerrang	link
MetalSucks	link
Pitchfork Media	(7.7/10) link
PopMatters	link
Sputnikmusic	link

Melana Chasmata received universal acclaim from both critics and band fans. Writing for All About the Rock, Rich Dodgin said: "The music of Melana Chasmata combines heaviness and gothic sensibility to create a fantastically nightmarish soundscape, and if you're a fan of dark ambient music you will love this". MetalSucks also praised the album, giving it five stars out of five. It also scored a perfect five out of five on MetalUnderground.com, whose reviewer, Oliver Hynes, stated that "Melana Chasmata is more than just a metal album... It's art". Exclaim! was also positive about the album and rated it an 8 out of 10, calling it "an impressive continuation of Tom G. Warrior's often-mighty lineage, addressing each and every one of his strengths while offering something new for those unaware of the history embedded in every note". Pitchfork Media were slightly less impressed with the album and gave it a 7.7 out of 10, with reviewer Andy O'Connor stating: "Melana Chasmata is the follow-up [to Eparistera Daimones], and while it retains much of the strength of its predecessor, it doesn't quite feel like the triumph Triptykon's debut did". Melana Chasmata was placed as number two on Rolling Stone's 20 Best Metal Albums of 2014. It was voted as "Album of the Year 2014" by the editorial staff of Dutch webzine Lords of Metal.

== Commercial performance ==
The album debuted at No. 171 on the Billboard 200 and at No. 11 in the Hard Rock Albums chart, with 2,950 copies sold in its debut week in the U.S.

== Track listing ==
The album's official track listing was unveiled by Tom Warrior on his official blog on 7 February 2014. A teaser 7" single containing the tracks "Breathing" and "Boleskine House" was released on 17 March 2014.

All lyrics are written by Tom Gabriel Warrior; all music is composed by Norman Lonhard, V. Santura, Vanja Slajh, Tom Gabriel Warrior, except where noted.

No.	Title	Music	Length
1.	"Tree of Suffocating Souls"		7:56
2.	"Boleskine House"		7:12
3.	"Altar of Deceit"		7:32
4.	"Breathing"		5:50
5.	"Aurorae"		6:17
6.	"Demon Pact"		6:07
7.	"In the Sleep of Death"	V. Santura	8:10
8.	"Black Snow"		12:25
9.	"Waiting"		5:55
Total length:			67:23

Japanese edition bonus track
No.	Title	Length
5.	"Into Despair"	7:57

== Charts ==
Chart (2012)	Peak position
US Independent Albums (Billboard)	33
US Billboard 200	171
US Top Hard Rock Albums (Billboard)	11

== Personnel ==
- Thomas Gabriel Fischer – guitar, vocals
- V. Santura – guitar, vocals
- Norman Lonhard – drums, percussion
- Vanja Šlajh – bass, backing vocals

Additional musicians

- Simone Vollenweider – additional vocals (track 2 and 9)
- Michael Zech – guitar (track 6)
- A. Acanthus Gristle – additional vocals (track 8)

Miscellaneous staff

- Thomas Gabriel Fischer, V. Santura – production
- V. Santura – mastering
- H. R. Giger – cover art "Mordor VII"
