= Into the Pandemonium =

1987 studio album by Celtic Frost

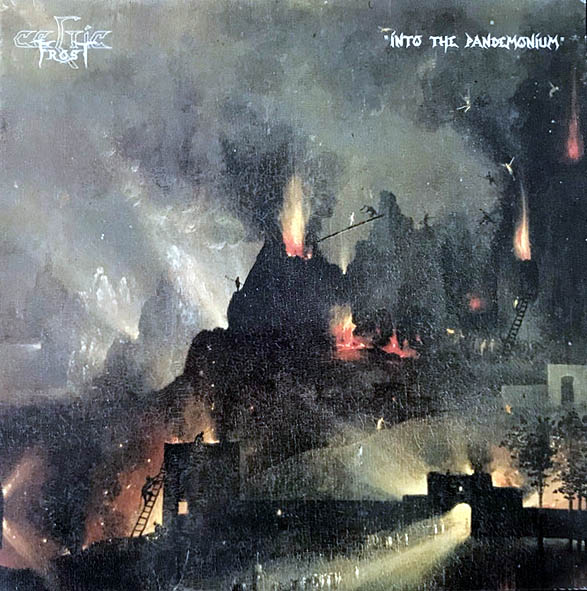

Studio album by Celtic Frost
- Released: 1 June 1987
- Recorded: January–April 1987
- Studio: Horus Sound Studio, Hannover, Germany
- Genre: Thrash metal; avant-garde metal; gothic metal; symphonic metal
- Length: 39:11
- Label: Noise (Europe); Combat/Noise (US)
- Producer: Celtic Frost

Celtic Frost chronology
Tragic Serenades (1986)	Into the Pandemonium (1987)	Cold Lake (1988)

Singles from Into the Pandemonium
- 1. "I Won't Dance" Released: 1987

Into the Pandemonium is the third studio album by Swiss extreme metal band Celtic Frost, released on 1 June 1987 through Noise Records in Europe, and through Combat Records in the US. The album marks the return of bassist and backing vocalist Martin Eric Ain, who had previously appeared on 1984's Morbid Tales, but not on the band's previous album.

The album furthers Celtic Frost's experimental bent, with unlikely covers choices (Wall of Voodoo's "Mexican Radio"), industrial-tinged tracks ("One In their Pride") and gothic rock tendencies. The already traditional Frost-styled orchestral flourishes with female vocals are also present. Initially met with mixed reviews, Into the Pandemonium's acceptance quickly grew and it became the band's most successful record.

The album also marked the end of their tenure with Noise Records. A costly legal battle with the label ensued, due to accusations by the band that Noise sabotaged the album's promotion.

== Production ==
The rehearsals for the album started during the second half of 1986. The band early on discarded the working titles Silent Excess and Monumentum in favor of the familiar Into the Pandemonium.

Noise label boss Karl-Ulrich Walterbach "didn't get" Celtic Frost's new material, and threatened multiple times to defund the recording if they didn't play run-on-the-mill thrash metal. This estrangement with the band's left-field approach continued after the album's release. During Pandemonium's listening party at SPV's offices Walterbach approached Warrior and asked, "Why don't you try to sound more like Exodus or Slayer?" Walterbach's sarcasm infuriated Frost's main composer.

== Musical style ==
The band had in mind the bold objective to surpass all their previous body of work. The push came largely from being blown away by the freshness of new wave. Every newly discovered record presented other musical vistas, a neverending supply of novel and original ideas. With this broadening of horizons, Celtic Frost were adamant that no set of rules would smother their creativity—especially those of extreme metal. "We hated these unwritten limitations in the metal scene", Warrior reminisced.

Both Warrior and Ain were post-punk devotees, especially of goth acts Bauhaus, Christian Death, Siouxsie and the Banshees and The Sisters of Mercy. Paradise Lost main composer and guitarist Gregor Mackintosh spotted the Christian Death influence on Warrior's new "whiny" vocal style, used throughout the album. In his opinion, it was "lifted straight" from the late Rozz Williams, especially his singing on Only Theatre of Pain.

One particularly controversial portion of the album was the dance-oriented "One in Their Pride", a track built around soundbites from NASA's Apollo program. Its use of sampling and drum machines reminded Belgian EBM group Front 242. Dan Lilker, former Anthrax and Nuclear Assault bassist, confessed his enstrangement with this track. Lilker said this enstrangement was generalized throughout the scene at the time. This was an instance where Tom Warrior acknowledged that the band "went too far" on their experiments. In the long run, he considered this track a mistake. Chuck Eddy compared "One in Their Pride", with its pared-down bass, to Adrian Sherwood's production work for Tackhead and Keith Le Blanc. "Rex Irae", another rhythmic song, was described by Eddy as "a dub/riff mixture" that is comparable to Chain Gang, Ruts DC and A.R. Kane.

== Themes ==
Celtic Frost were always fascinated with the rise and fall of ancient civilizations; their own name stands for this idea. Three songs from Into the Pandemonium—"Babylon Fell", "Caress into Oblivion" and "Rex Irae"—deal with the myths and history of the Babylonians, especially those of king Nebuchadnezzar II and Marduk, god-patron of the city of Babylon, capital of the Persian Empire.

"I Won't Dance (The Elders' Orient)" was inspired originally by the Egyptian Book of the Dead.

19th-century poetry was another source of inspiration for the lyrics. For example, significant portions of "Inner Sanctum" are directly quoted from Emily Brontë poems. Martin Ain discovered these on L'Homme devant la mort (The Hour of Our Death.) by French historian Philippe Ariès. On the other hand, the lyrics to "Tristesses de la lune" are borrowed from the poem of the same name in Charles Baudelaire's Les Fleurs du mal. The lyrics to "Sorrows of the Moon" are an English translation of the same. Moonspell vocalist Fernando Ribeiro discovered Baudelaire through this song.

== Album art ==
The cover image is a detail from the right (Hell) panel of The Garden of Earthly Delights, a triptych painted in 1504 by Hieronymus Bosch, part of Madrid's Prado permanent collection. The original idea of using this painting for Into the Pandemonium's cover came through Martin Ain. The LP's inner sleeve was the Les Edwards Tombworld (1980) painting. As to how the band's music can be linked their album art, Tom Warrior explained:

To determine what the album will look like helps us to formulate its musical content. It makes it possible to arrange and design our material according to our feelings and interpretation of the paintings. I don't know whether this is easy to understand or not. As the cover art represents the musical content of our albums, so the musical content reflects the mood of the cover.

== Touring and promotion ==
In Warrior's recollection, three quarters into production Celtic Forst were forced, by Noise, to do some dates with Anthrax. If they didn't, the label would cut short the funding for Pandemonium. In his defense, label boss Karl-Ulrich Walterbach stated that he simply offered the tour and never pushed it. He knew the timing wasn't ideal for the band. One of these dates was the 1987 edition of the Aardschokdag, a Dutch annual heavy metal festival. Frost played alongside Anthrax, Metal Church, Crimson Glory, Lȧȧz Rockit and headliners Metallica on February 8.

After the album's release, American guitarist Ron Marks was invited to join the band, in part to bolster its live sound.

Celtic Frost did a brief English tour on late October, with Kreator and Virus. They then flew to the United States, to be the opening act to the December leg of Anthrax's Among the Living tour. Frost caught the thrash explosion in the US. In a few months, Anthrax went from playing to 500 people per show to 7,000 or 8,000 every night, without radio play or MTV exposure.

After Into the Pandemonium, Celtic Frost became one of Noise's bestsellers. By the end of the year, the band's third album had sold 100,000 records worldwide. Alongside the 250,000 sold by Running Wild's Under Jolly Roger and the 500,000 sold of Helloween's Keeper of the Seven Keys: Part I, 1987 helped usher a new era for the German label. There were a number of factors that aided this turn of events: SPV's European distribution network, RCA's promotional push behind Helloween and an enthusiastic metal press.

Thomas Gabriel Fischer finally performed Celtic Frost's requiem at Roadburn 2019 with Triptykon, along with the Metropole Orkest. Into the Pandemonium's "Rex Irae" is the opening part; the third, concluding part—"Winter (Requiem, Chapter Three: Finale)"—can be heard on 2006's Monotheist. The second, long-missing second part ("Grave Eternal") was never officially released until these performances. A full, live rendition of the entire piece has been released.

== Legacy ==
Professional ratings
Review scores
Source	Rating
AllMusic	4.5/5 stars
Collector's Guide to Heavy Metal	7/10

Malcolm Dome called Into the Pandemonium both "metal's most visionary album" and an "avant-garde metal masterpiece". Tom Warrior himself said that it is "the band's most important release". AllMusic reviewer Eduardo Rivadavia considered Into the Pandemonium "one of the classic extreme metal albums of all time". In 1991, Eddy ranked Into the Pandemonium at number 108 in his list of the 500 best heavy metal albums ever.

Into the Pandemonium had a decisive impact on the emerging gothic metal scene of the 1990s. Paradise Lost collectively held the album in high esteem. "It made [us] what we are", said Mackintosh, "and so many other bands [...] too". Rhythm guitarist Aaron Aedy pointed out that Pandemonium's use of orchestration inspired their sophomore album, Gothic. My Dying Bride's Andrew Craighan revealed that adventurous use of violins on Into the Pandemonium encouraged MDB to do the same. Craighan felt something like "we can do that if they're doing it". Moonspell's Ribeiro found Pandemonium "groundbreaking and inspiring". He preferred Celtic Frost's unorthodox approach to heavy metal "than to be bound to an unwritten book of Underground laws to please others instead of our artistic hunger". This particular record made them deepen the connection with their Middle Eastern and African musical heritage, a big part of the folk music from their native Portugal.

Warrior's "goth" crooning on Pandemonium also prove influential to gothic metal pioneers. Paradise Lost singer Nick Holmes said "Mesmerized" was his second favorite Celtic Frost song, partly because of how Warrior sang on it. Anathema's Vincent Cavanagh, later on, would borrow Warrior's moaned-style singing on "Mesmerized" for The Silent Enigma's title track.

Celtic Frost's third album also had a lasting influence on symphonic metal. Therion mainman Christofer Johnsson, in particular, frequently acknowledges its importance. In 2021, it was elected by Metal Hammer as the second best symphonic metal album of all time.

== Track listings ==
=== Original LP ===
Side One
No.	Title	Writer(s)	Length
1.	"Mexican Radio" (Wall of Voodoo cover)	Marc Moreland, Stan Ridgway	3:28
2.	"Mesmerized"	Martin Eric Ain, Thomas Gabriel Warrior	3:24
3.	"Inner Sanctum"	Warrior, Ain	5:14
4.	"Sorrows of the Moon"	Ain	3:04
5.	"Babylon Fell"	Warrior	4:18

Side Two
No.	Title	Writer(s)	Length
6.	"Caress into Oblivion"	Warrior	5:10
7.	"One in Their Pride"	Warrior	2:50
8.	"I Won't Dance"	Warrior	4:31
9.	"Rex Irae (Requiem)"	Warrior	5:57
10.	"Oriental Masquerade"	Warrior	1:15

=== Original CD ===
No.	Title	Length
1.	"Mexican Radio"	3:28
2.	"Mesmerized"	3:24
3.	"Inner Sanctum"	5:14
4.	"Tristesses de la Lune"	2:58
5.	"Babylon Fell (Jade Serpent)"	4:18
6.	"Caress into Oblivion (Jade Serpent II)"	5:10
7.	"One in Their Pride" (Porthole Mix)	2:50
8.	"I Won't Dance (The Elders' Orient)"	4:31
9.	"Sorrows of the Moon"	3:04
10.	"Rex Irae (Requiem)"	5:57
11.	"Oriental Masquerade"	1:15
12.	"One in Their Pride" (Re-entry Mix)	5:52

=== 1999 remastered CD edition bonus tracks ===
No.	Title	Writer(s)	Length
13.	"In the Chapel, in the Moonlight"	Billy Hill	2:04
14.	"The Inevitable Factor"	Warrior, Ain, Reed St. Mark	4:38
15.	"The Inevitable Factor" (Alternate Vox)	Warrior, Ain, St. Mark	4:38

== Personnel ==
Celtic Frost

- Thomas Gabriel Warrior – vocals, guitars, synthesizers, effects
- Martin Eric Ain – bass, effects, backing vocals
- Reed St. Mark – drums, percussions, synthesizers, effects, backing vocals

Additional musicians (CD editions)

- Manü Moan (The Vyllies) – vocals (track 4)
- Andreas Dobler – guitars (tracks 9, 10, 14, 15)
- Lothar Krist – orchestral arrangements, conductor (tracks 4, 10, 11)
- Malgorzata Blaiejewska Woller, Eva Cieslinski – violins (tracks 4, 10, 11)
- Wulf Ebert – cello (tracks 4, 10, 11)
- Gypsy – viola (tracks 4, 10, 11)
- Anton Schreiber – French horn (tracks 10, 11)
- Thomas Berter – backing vocals (track 1)
- Claudia-Maria Mokri – backing vocals (tracks 2, 5, 10)
- H.C. 1922 – backing vocals (track 8)
- Marchain Regee Rotschy – backing vocals (track 13)

Production

- Celtic Frost – producers
- Jan Nemec – engineer, sample editing (tracks 7, 12)
