= Eparistera Daimones =

- Cover art by H. R. Giger

Studio album by Triptykon
- Released: 22 March 2010
- Recorded: August–November 2009
- Studio: Various: Woodshed Studio, Landshut, Germany; The Inner Sanctum, Zürich, Switzerland; Studio Zollhaus, Oensingen, Switzerland
- Genre: Doom metal; gothic metal; black metal; death metal; avant-garde metal
- Length: 72:41
- Label: Prowling Death; Century Media
- Producer: Antje Lange (exec.); Thomas Gabriel Fischer (also exec.); V. Santura

Triptykon chronology
Eparistera Daimones (2010)	Shatter (2010)

Professional ratings
Review scores
Source	Rating
AllMusic	4.5/5 stars
About.com	4.5/5 stars
Blabbermouth	9/10 stars
Angry Metal Guy	4.5/5 stars
Metal Storm	8.4/10
Popmatters.com	8/10
Lords of Metal	100%
Metal Reviews	92/100
Metal Crypt	not rated

Eparistera Daimones is the debut album by Swiss extreme metal band Triptykon, the most recent musical project of Thomas Gabriel Fischer (a.k.a. Tom G. Warrior), founding member of the pioneering heavy metal bands Hellhammer and Celtic Frost and industrial project Apollyon Sun.

The album was released by Prowling Death Records Ltd., under a licensing agreement with Century Media Records on 22 March 2010, and was released by Victor Entertainment Japan on 21 April 2010 with a bonus track, "Shatter". Upon its release, Eparistera Daimones was met with universal acclaim by both music critics and band fans.

Eparistera Daimones was produced by Thomas Gabriel Fischer and Triptykon guitarist V. Santura and recorded in V. Santura's own Woodshed Studio in southern Germany, in the course of the second half of 2009. Like Celtic Frost's Monotheist album, Eparistera Daimones was mastered by Walter Schmid at Oakland Recording in Winterthur, Switzerland.

The album features artwork by H. R. Giger and Vincent Castiglia.

The title of album is originally from Aleister Crowley's Liber XXV: The Star Ruby ritual. Eparistera Daimones (ΕΠΑΡΙΣΤΕΡΑ ΔΑΙΜΟΝΕΣ) in Greek means On my left hand the Daemones or To my left, the demons.

"Myopic Empire" comes from "Relinquished Body", a demo track from Celtic Frost's 2002 demo album Prototype.

== Track listing ==
All lyrics are written by Thomas Gabriel Fischer; all music is composed by Fischer, except where noted

No.	Title	Music	Length
1.	"Goetia"		11:00
2.	"Abyss Within My Soul"		9:26
3.	"In Shrouds Decayed"	V. Santura	6:55
4.	"Shrine" (instrumental)		1:43
5.	"A Thousand Lies"		5:28
6.	"Descendant"	V. Santura	7:41
7.	"Myopic Empire"	Fischer; Erol Unala; Gian Gadient	5:47
8.	"My Pain"		5:19
9.	"The Prolonging"		19:22
Total length:			72:41

Japanese edition
No.	Title	Length
10.	"Shatter"	4:58
Total length:		77:41

== Formats ==
Eparistera Daimones was released in several formats including CD, digipak CD, and double gatefold LP.

== Chart positions ==
Chart (2010)	Peak position
German Albums Chart	81
Greek Albums Chart	17
Finnish Albums Chart	28
Swiss Albums Chart	73
US Billboard Top Heatseekers	27

== Personnel ==
- Thomas Gabriel Fischer – vocals, guitar, keyboards, programming
- V. Santura – guitar, vocals
- Norman Lonhard – drums & percussion
- Vanja Slajh – bass

=== Collaborations ===
- Simone Vollenweider – additional vocals
- A. Acanthus Gristle – additional vocals
- Fredy Schnyder – grand piano
- Nadine Rimlinger – violin

=== Production ===
- Tom Gabriel Warrior and V. Santura – production, recording and mixing
- Walter Schmid – mastering
- Antje Lange and Tom Warrior – executive producers
- Vincent Castiglia – band illustrations
- H. R. Giger – cover art "Vlad Tepes"
