= Tragic Serenades =

EP by Celtic Frost
- Released: July 1986
- Recorded: 13–15 March 1986
- Studio: Musiclab Studio in Berlin (new recordings)
- Genre: Thrash metal; black metal
- Length: 11:40
- Label: Noise
- Producer: Thomas G. Warrior, Martin Eric Ain, Karl Walterbach

Celtic Frost chronology
To Mega Therion (1985)	Tragic Serenades (1986)	Into the Pandemonium (1987)

Professional ratings
Review scores
Source	Rating
AllMusic	2/5 stars
Collector's Guide to Heavy Metal	6/10
Kerrang!	5/5 stars

Tragic Serenades is an EP by Swiss extreme metal band Celtic Frost, released in July 1986 through Noise Records. The EP features three reworked tracks from previous releases.

== Overview ==
According to frontman Thomas Gabriel Fischer, the purpose of this EP was to include Martin Eric Ain's bass lines and improve on Horst Müller's original production of two tracks from To Mega Therion. The re-recorded version of "Return to the Eve" shows Reed's habit of loudly goofing off during songs, with Reed loosely sharing lead vocals. The original version was featured on the Morbid Tales album. Celtic Frost included this "party-like studio jam" of the song on Tragic Serenades as their "first public display of light-heartedness".

The EP was reissued in 2018, with 2,500 copies pressed for Record Store Day 2018.

== Track listing ==
Side one
No.	Title	Length
1.	"The Usurper"	3:26
2.	"Jewel Throne"	4:03

Side two
No.	Title	Length
3.	"Return to the Eve" (Party Mix)	4:10
Total length:		11:40

== Personnel ==
Celtic Frost

- Thomas G. Warrior – vocals, guitar, effects, producer
- Martin Ain – bass, effects, producer
- Reed St. Mark – drums, percussion, effects

Production

- Horst Müller – engineer (original recordings)
- Harris Johns – engineer (new recordings)
- Karl "Jeder Will 1500" Walterbach – executive producer
