= Shatter (EP) =

EP by Triptykon
- Released: 25 October 2010
- Genre: Black metal, death metal, doom metal, gothic metal, avant-garde metal
- Length: 27:43
- Label: Prowling Death, Century Media
- Producer: Thomas Gabriel Fischer

Triptykon chronology
Eparistera Daimones (2010)	Shatter (2010)	Melana Chasmata (2014)

Professional ratings
Review scores
Source	Rating
About.com	4/5 stars
AllMusic	3/5 stars

Shatter is an EP by Swiss extreme metal band Triptykon, released on 25 October 2010. The EP consists of the bonus track "Shatter" from the Japanese edition of Eparistera Daimones, as well as other songs from the recording sessions of that album, including a newly mastered version of their demo "Crucifixus". Tracks 4 and 5 are live versions of Celtic Frost songs, recorded during Triptykon's headliner performance at the Roadburn Festival in Tilburg, the Netherlands, on 16 April 2010. "Dethroned Emperor" features guest lead vocals by Nocturno Culto (Darkthrone, Sarke).

== Release ==
Shatter has been released in multiple formats, such as a CD, a 12" vinyl, and a digital download. A music video for the song "Shatter" was also released.

== Track listing ==
No.	Title	Length
1.	"Shatter"	4:56
2.	"I Am the Twilight"	7:59
3.	"Crucifixus"	4:18
4.	"Circle of the Tyrants" (live)	5:12
5.	"Dethroned Emperor" (live)	5:18
Total length:		27:43

== Personnel ==
- Thomas Gabriel Fischer – vocals, guitar, programming
- V. Santura – guitar, vocals
- Norman Lonhard – drums, percussion
- Vanja Slajh – bass, backing vocals

=== Guest musicians ===
- Simone Vollenweider – vocals on "Shatter"
- Nadine Rimlinger – violin on "I am the Twilight"
- A. Acanthus Gristle – vocals on "Crucifixus"
- Nocturno Culto – vocals on "Dethroned Emperor"
