= Thomas Gabriel Fischer =

Swiss musician

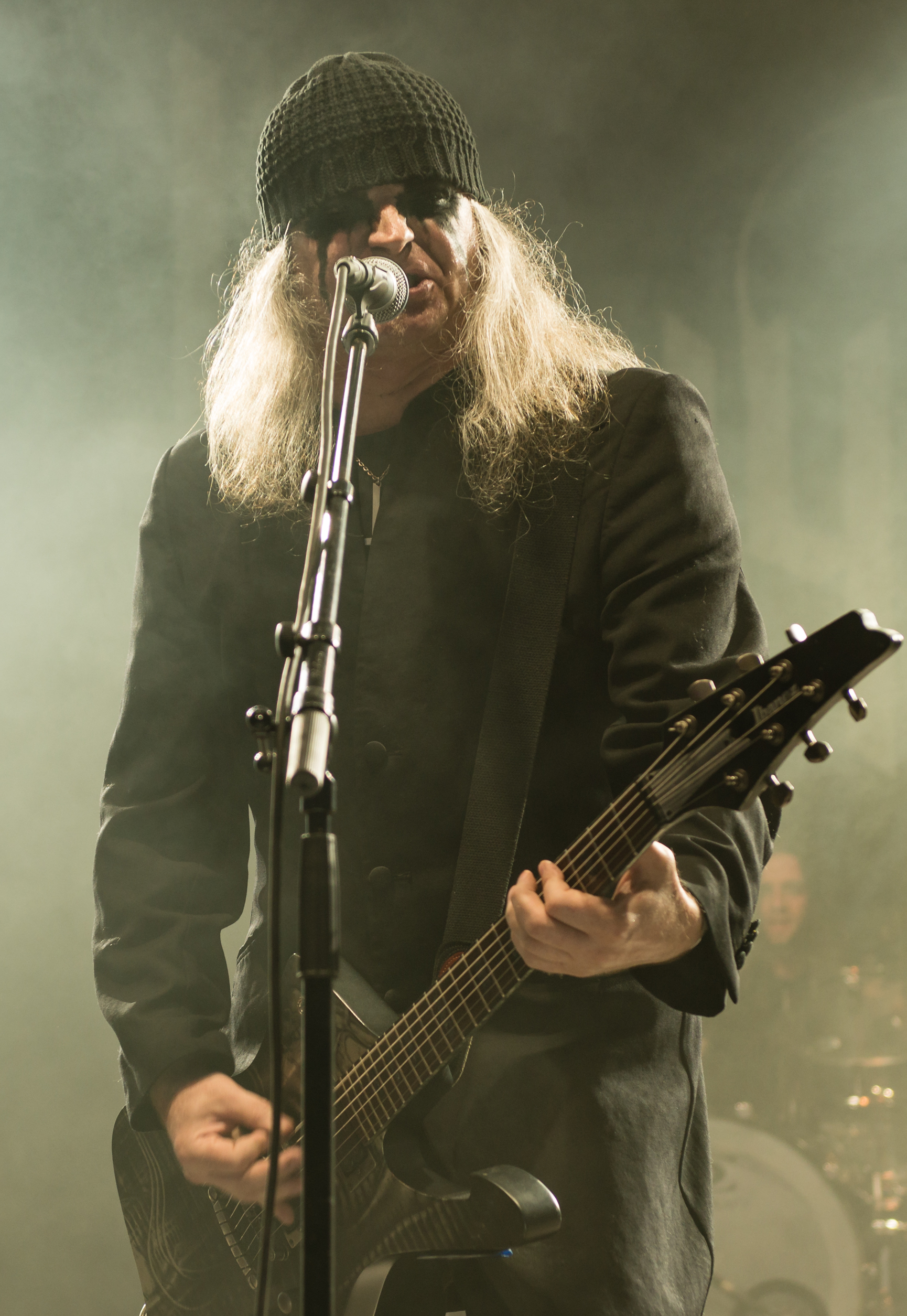
- Fischer on stage with Triptykon in 2014

Background information
- Also known as: Tom Warrior; Tom G. Warrior; Tom Gabriel Warrior; Satanic Slaughter
- Born: 19 July 1963 (age 62)
- Origin: Switzerland
- Genres: Doom metal; thrash metal; black metal; death metal; avant-garde metal; industrial metal; gothic metal
- Occupations: Musician; songwriter; producer
- Instruments: Vocals; guitar; bass; keyboards; programming
- Member of: Triptykon; Triumph Of Death
- Formerly of: Hellhammer; Celtic Frost; Apollyon Sun

Thomas Gabriel Fischer (born 19 July 1963), also known by the stage names Tom Warrior and Satanic Slaughter, is a Swiss musician. He led the extreme metal bands Hellhammer and Celtic Frost, and is currently the frontman of the bands Triptykon and Triumph of Death.

== Career ==
Fischer was born in a small village in Switzerland and his parents were motorcycle racer and journalist Klaus Fischer and tailor and "diamond smuggler" Eva. They divorced when Fischer was six years old.

Fischer started his musical career in 1981 in two short lived heavy metal bands with the same members - Tarot and Grave Hill. Members at that time were: Tom Fischer (bass / guitar), Alfredo “Stonehead” Pappalardo (bass), Alois “Jay Blackwood” Wendelin (drums), Philipp “Phil Hunter” Veraguth (vocals) and Urs Sprenger (vocals). The band unusually had two bassists, and Fischer and Sprenger took the stage names "Tom G. Warrior" and "Steve Warrior" as a homage to NWOBHM bands of the time that had brothers in them: Raven and Tank.

Fischer ("Tom Warrior"), now on guitar along with Grave Hill member Urs Sprenger ("Steve Warrior") on bass and Pete Stratton (real name Peter Ebneter) on drums, formed the metal band Hammerhead in May 1982. Stratton was soon replaced by former Moorhead drummer Bruce "Denial Fiend" Day (real name Jörg Neubart), and the band changed its name to Hellhammer that same year. In late 1983, bassist and songwriter Martin Eric Ain joined Hellhammer, and the lineup of Fischer, Ain, and Day recorded the EP Apocalyptic Raids, as well as a series of demos for the German label Noise Records, before disbanding in May 1984. Fischer and Ain then reunited to form Celtic Frost, an influential avant-garde and extreme metal trio, in June 1984.

In 1985, Fischer was invited to co-produce and sing on the first demo, titled Death Cult, by fellow Swiss group Coroner. Fischer also wrote the lyrics for the songs recorded. Two of Coroner's members served as part of Celtic Frost's road crew until 1986. In 1987, internal conflicts within Celtic Frost led to the band's dissolution.

Several months later, Fischer reformed the band with a completely new lineup. However, the band's 1988 release, Cold Lake, marked a drastic shift in Celtic Frost's sound, moving from their traditional thrash/death/black metal style to a traditional heavy metal/glam metal approach, which greatly disappointed most fans. Fischer has repeatedly stated that he takes full responsibility for this negative change in direction, explaining that he was distracted by a personal relationship and allowed the other band members too much creative control. Celtic Frost eventually disbanded in 1993.

A year after Celtic Frost disbanded, Fischer formed the EBM/industrial rock project Apollyon Sun.

In 2000, Fischer's book Are You Morbid?: Into the Pandemonium of Celtic Frost received many positive reviews, including one from Record Collector, which praised it as: "Intelligent, humble, questioning, insightful – the cultured side of extreme metal."

Sometime in 2001, Fischer and Martin Eric Ain reconnected and began collaborating on music, aiming to create a new, dark, and heavy Celtic Frost album reminiscent of their work on To Mega Therion and Into the Pandemonium. This effort culminated in the release of the album Monotheist in 2006.

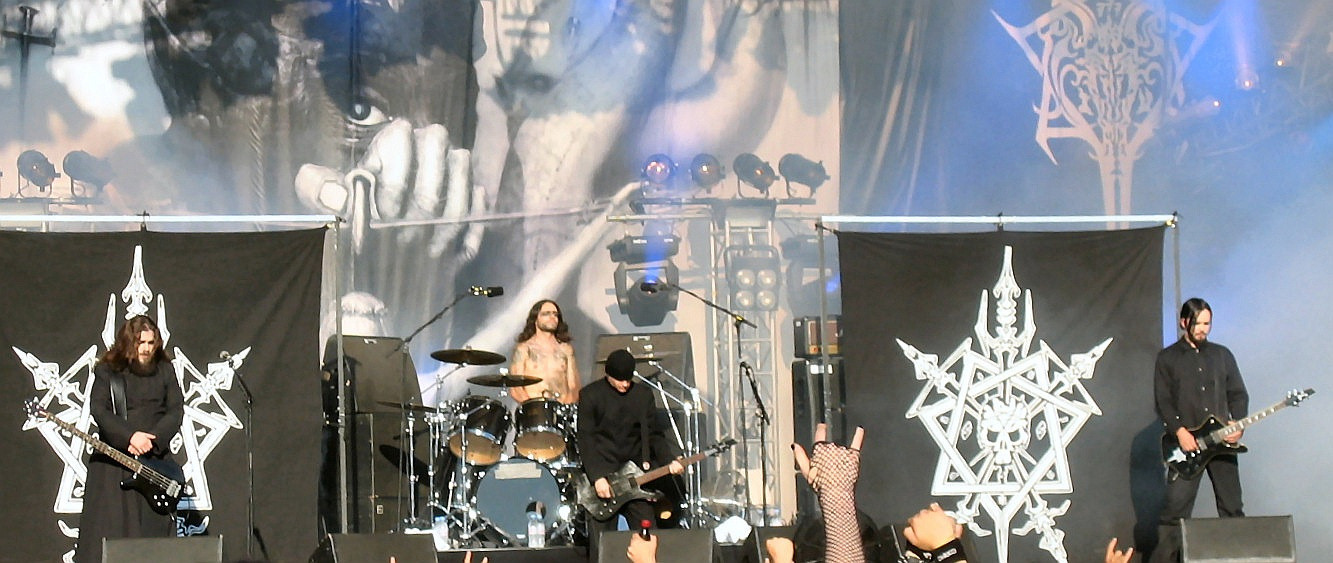
Celtic Frost at Tuska Open Air 2006

Fischer also contributed to Dave Grohl's collaborative project Probot in 2003, performing on the song "Big Sky."

In 2005, Fischer produced vocal tracks (performed by Martin Eric Ain) and guitar tracks (Erol Uenala) for a "gothicized" version of Slayer's classic "Black Magic," recorded by the Los Angeles–based gothic rock band Hatesex. This track appeared on their debut album Unwant.

Due to internal conflict within Celtic Frost, Fischer left the band on 2 April 2008 and subsequently launched a new band named Triptykon.

In 2008, Fischer played guitars and bass for a cover of "Set the Controls for the Heart of the Sun" on the album Revelations of the Black Flame by 1349, a Norwegian black metal band. He also co-mixed the album. In 2009, he co-produced their subsequent album, Demonoir.

In 2010, Fischer was honored with the Inspiration Award at the Metal Hammer Golden Gods Awards. Additionally, he was ranked No. 32 on Guitar World magazine's list of the 100 Greatest Heavy Metal Guitarists of All Time.

In 2019, Fischer established the band Triumph Of Death as a tribute to Hellhammer's legacy. In 2023, the band released a live album, Resurrection Of The Flesh. Triumph Of Death has been actively playing around the world ever since.

== Personal life ==
Fischer currently plays an Ibanez H. R. Giger series Iceman guitar and uses an Ibanez Tube Screamer overdrive pedal.

Fischer is vegan and an active defender of animal rights. He has also stated that he does not drink, smoke, or take drugs.

From 2007 until H. R. Giger's death, Fischer was the artist's personal assistant. He was a close friend of Giger and still a friend of his widow, Carmen Giger. Fischer remains involved with the Giger estate. He is an active member of the Fondation H.R. Giger and also the co-director of the Museum HR Giger.

== Discography ==
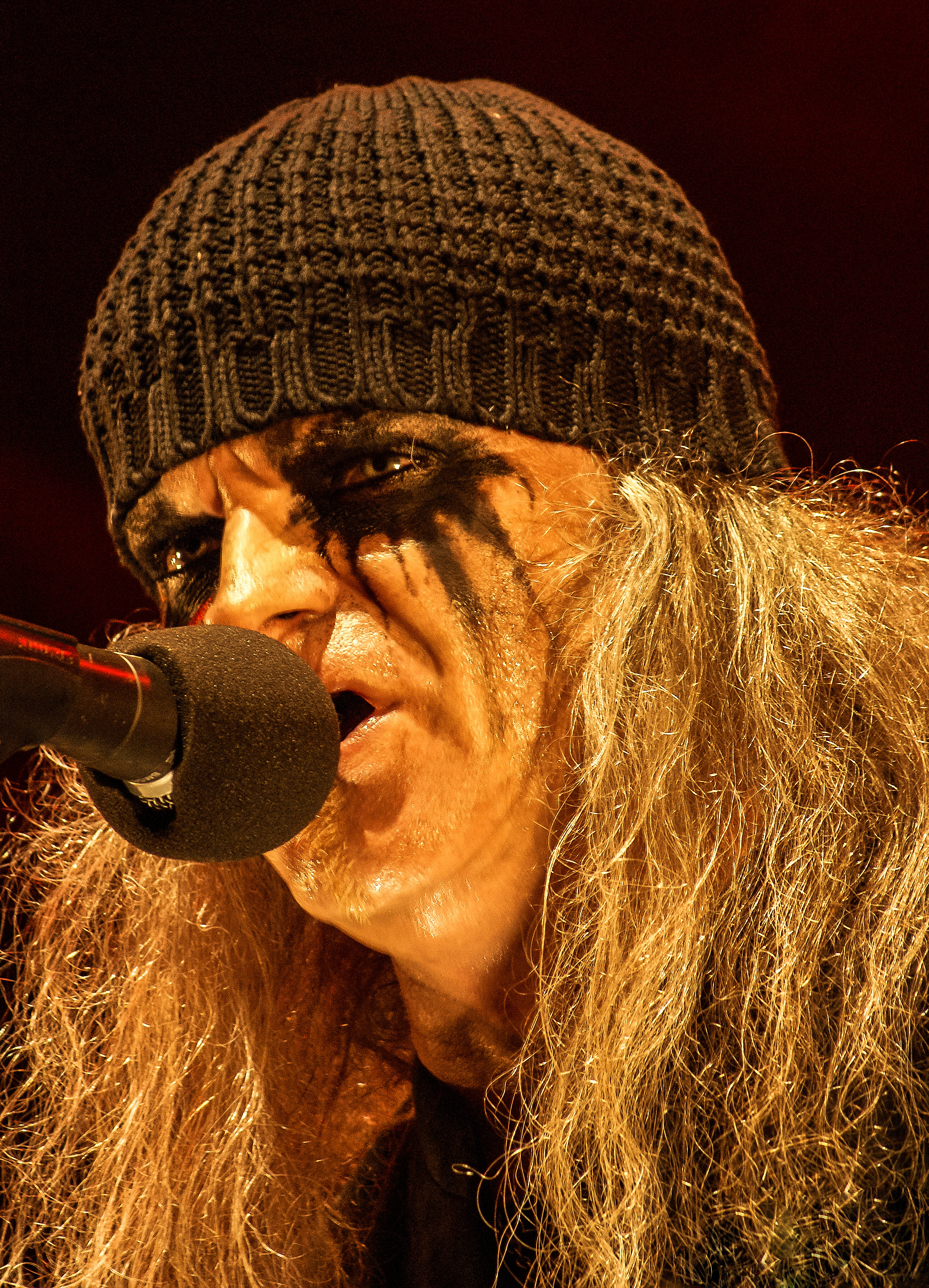
Fischer at Hellfest 2011

=== Hellhammer ===
- Death Fiend (demo, 1983)
- Triumph of Death (demo, 1983)
- Satanic Rites (demo, 1983)
- Apocalyptic Raids (EP, 1984)
- Apocalyptic Raids 1990 A.D. (compilation, 1990)
- Demon Entrails (compilation, 2008)
- Blood Insanity (single, 2016)

=== Celtic Frost ===
- Morbid Tales (mini-album, 1984)
- Emperor's Return (EP, 1985)
- To Mega Therion (album, 1985)
- Tragic Serenades (EP, 1986)
- Into the Pandemonium (album, 1987)
- I Won't Dance (EP, 1987)
- Cold Lake (album, 1988)
- Vanity/Nemesis (album, 1990)
- Wine in My Hand (EP, 1990)
- Parched with Thirst Am I and Dying (compilation, 1992)
- Monotheist (album, 2006)
- Innocence and Wrath (compilation, 2017)

=== Coroner ===
- Death Cult (demo, 1986)

=== Apollyon Sun ===
- God Leaves (And Dies) (EP, 1998)
- Sub (album, 2000)

=== Probot ===
- Probot (album, 2004)

=== Dark Fortress ===
- Eidolon (album, 2008)

=== 1349 ===
- Revelations of the Black Flame (album, 2009)

=== Triptykon ===
- Eparistera Daimones (album, 2010)
- Shatter (EP, 2010)
- Breathing (single, 2014)
- Melana Chasmata (album, 2014)
- Requiem – Live at Roadburn 2019 (album, 2020)

=== Triumph Of Death ===
- Resurrection Of The Flesh (live album, 2023)

== Bibliography ==
- Fischer, Tom Gabriel; Ain, Martin Eric (2010). Only Death Is Real: An Illustrated History of Hellhammer and Early Celtic Frost 1981–85. Brooklyn, New York: Bazillion Points. ISBN 978-0-9796163-9-6.
- Frasier, Sean (May 2015). "Decibel Presents The Top 30 Greatest Extreme Vocalists of All Time: #1 - Tom G. Warrior". Decibel (127). Philadelphia, Pennsylvania, U.S.: 62–64, 66–68, 70, 72, 74. ISSN 1557-2137.
