= Vanity/Nemesis =

Studio album by Celtic Frost
- Released: 11 April 1990
- Recorded: 1989
- Studio: Sky Track Studio and Hansa Studios, Berlin, Germany
- Genre: Heavy metal; thrash metal; gothic metal
- Length: 45:38
- Label: EMI/Noise; Noise/RCA (USA)
- Producer: Roli Mosimann; Karl-Ulrich Walterbach

Celtic Frost chronology
Cold Lake (1988)	Vanity/Nemesis (1990)	Parched with Thirst Am I and Dying (1992)

Singles from Vanity/Nemesis
- 1. "Wine in My Hand (Third from the Sun)" Released: 1990

Professional ratings
Review scores
Source	Rating
AllMusic	4/5 stars
Collector's Guide to Heavy Metal	9/10

Vanity/Nemesis is the fifth studio album by Swiss heavy metal band Celtic Frost, released on 11 April 1990 through Noise Records.

Modern reviews see this album as a return to form compared to the band's previous album, Cold Lake, but contemporary critics panned it. The band continued experimenting and evolving their music, this time fusing elements of traditional heavy metal, thrash metal and gothic rock. It has a different sound from the black/thrash metal of the first two albums, or the avant-garde metal of Into the Pandemonium, although Vanity/Nemesis retains lyrical and musical elements from those releases.

Vanity/Nemesis would be Celtic Frost's last studio album before the dissolution of the band in 1993 and until their return album in 2006 Monotheist. Vanity/Nemesis was re-released in 1999 with additional tracks. The album also includes a cover of David Bowie's 1977 hit "Heroes".

The track "The Heart Beneath" was used on the Manga Entertainment compilation trailers on the UK, Dutch, Spanish and Australian released video tapes.

== Track listing ==
No.	Title	Lyrics	Music	Length
1.	"The Heart Beneath"	Thomas Gabriel Warrior	Curt Victor Bryant, Stephen Priestly, Warrior	3:49
2.	"Wine in My Hand (Third from the Sun)"	Warrior	Bryant, Priestly, Warrior	3:26
3.	"Wings of Solitude"	Warrior	Warrior	4:35
4.	"The Name of My Bride"	Martin Eric Ain	Bryant	4:30
5.	"This Island Earth" (Bryan Ferry cover)	Ferry	Ferry	5:49
6.	"The Restless Seas"	Warrior	Bryant, Ron Marks, Warrior	4:40
7.	"Phallic Tantrum"	Ain, Warrior	Bryant, Warrior	3:31
8.	"A Kiss or a Whisper"	Ain, Warrior	Bryant, Warrior	3:04
9.	"Vanity"	Ain, Warrior	Bryant, Priestly, Warrior	4:24
10.	"Nemesis"	Ain, Warrior	Bryant, Marks, Warrior	7:46
Total length:				45:38

CD edition bonus track
No.	Title	Lyrics	Music	Length
11.	"Heroes" (David Bowie cover)	Bowie	Bowie, Brian Eno	3:45

1999 remastered edition bonus track
No.	Title	Lyrics	Music	Length
12.	"A Descent to Babylon (Babylon Asleep)"	Ain, Warrior	Marks, Warrior	4:26

== Personnel ==
Celtic Frost

- Thomas Gabriel Warrior – lead vocals, rhythm guitars (except tracks 3, 7), bass (track 7), backing vocals (tracks 1, 2, 6, 7, 8)
- Curt Victor Bryant – bass (except tracks 1, 7), lead and rhythm guitars (tracks 1, 2, 4, 5, 7, 8, 11, 12), backing vocals (tracks 1, 2)
- Martin Eric Ain – bass (track 1), backing vocals (tracks 1, 7, 10)
- Stephen Priestly – drums, backing vocals (track 2)

Additional musicians

- Ron Marks – lead and rhythm guitars (except tracks 2, 7), acoustic guitars (track 10)
- Michelle Fischer – additional vocals (track 1)
- Roli Mosimann – additional vocals (track 1), sampling keyboards (track 10)
- Michele Amar – additional vocals (tracks 3, 11)
- Uta Gunther – backing vocals (tracks 3, 6, 9, 10, 12)

Production

- Roli Mosimann – producer, additional arrangements
- Brian Martin – engineer, mixing
- Voco Fauxpas – engineer
- Alex Leser, Michele Amar, Andreas Gerhardt, Michael Herzog, Tom Re – assistant engineers
- Howie Weinberg – mastering at Masterdisk, New York
- Karl-U. Walterbach – executive producer
