= Cold Lake (album) =

Studio album by Celtic Frost
- Released: 1 September 1988
- Recorded: 1988
- Venue: Berlin, Germany
- Studio: Hansa Studios, Sky Trak Studios
- Genre: Heavy metal; glam metal
- Length: 44:57
- Label: Noise
- Producer: Celtic Frost; Tony Platt; Karl-Ulrich Walterbach

Celtic Frost chronology
Into the Pandemonium (1987)	Cold Lake (1988)	Vanity/Nemesis (1990)

Cold Lake is the fourth studio album by Swiss extreme metal band Celtic Frost, released on 1 September 1988 by Noise Records. It features a new lineup, reformed by bandleader Tom Warrior with newly joined musicians Oliver Amberg, Curt Victor Bryant and a returning Stephen Priestly, who had previously played with the band in 1984 on the Morbid Tales EP. Despite it being marketed to exploit the mass appeal of glam metal, the album has more of a traditional heavy metal sound.

The album was not popular with the group or its fans and is no longer available to buy, making the LP much sought after by collectors.

== Background ==
After a disheartening end to their "One in Their Pride" tour in Dallas, Texas, Tom Warrior decided to end the band. However, in mid-1988, at the request of Oliver Amberg and with the support of producer Tony Platt, the band was resurrected, although with an entirely new line-up (Oliver Amberg – guitars, Curt Victor Bryant – bass, Stephen Priestly – drums and additional vocals). Even though the project had the cooperation of Warrior, he held little interest in it and so allowed Amberg to do most of the musical composition.

== Reception ==
Professional ratings
Review scores
Source	Rating
AllMusic	3/5 stars
Collector's Guide to Heavy Metal	8/10

Upon its release, the album was panned by most music critics and the band was labeled a sell-out by its core fanbase. The appearance of the band was remade with teased hairstyle to look like popular glam metal acts such as Mötley Crüe. The earlier works by the band had been underground thrash/death/black metal. Modern reviews are more positive. AllMusic reviewer Bradley Torreano wrote that Cold Lake is "still the worst Celtic Frost album", but that it "really isn't that bad" and the "vibrant heavy metal here... is longing to be rediscovered by fans." Canadian journalist Martin Popoff considered Cold Lake a "good record", filled with riffs "awesome and sinister" and lyrics about street-level sin "almost scarier" than the abandoned black metal ones.

== Legacy ==
Amberg was quickly fired after the release of the album. When the band re-issued its back catalogue in 1999, they purposely omitted Cold Lake.

Some of the tracks appear on the compilation album Parched with Thirst Am I and Dying but in a different, heavier mix that Tom Warrior supervised.

Tom Warrior had this to say about Cold Lake:

I was too eager to simply have a good time, I was too happy to have new musicians who actually wanted to write and who didn't leave me with the immense burden of writing and producing the entire album (as it had been for the first three Celtic Frost albums). I therefore loosened control (of material and quality) too much. And I was too glad to let the darkness go – right down to the band's image.

The original concept for Cold Lake as outlined was now taking on its own dynamics and our focus became totally out of control. What was going to be a far more melodic (commercial) album by the original line-up became an overblown steam release valve for past frustrations, recorded by new musicians who didn't yet understand the legacy of Celtic Frost.

Tony Platt's faulty production and the hefty disagreements he had with us contributed to this. The mistakes are countless. Just two here: we didn't let go of Tony because we wanted a major name attached to the album – after all, that was what Celtic Frost always requested from Noise Records and had never gotten. Now it was possible. And Celtic Frost's traditional complete ignorance of what was appropriate now backfired when we did Cold Lake in this totally inappropriate way.

Tom has also said it was the "absolute worst I could do in my lifetime." He has also called it "an utter piece of shit" and "possibly the worst album ever created in heavy music."

== Track listing ==
All lyrics are written by Tom Gabriel Warrior, except where noted.

Side one
No.	Title	Music	Length
1.	"Human (Intro)"	Warrior	1:06
2.	"Seduce Me Tonight"	Warrior	3:18
3.	"Petty Obsession"	Oliver Amberg	3:17
4.	"(Once) They Were Eagles"	Amberg, Curt Victor Bryant	3:39
5.	"Cherry Orchards"	Amberg	4:19
6.	"Juices Like Wine"	Amberg, Bryant	4:17

Side two
No.	Title	Lyrics	Music	Length
7.	"Little Velvet"		Warrior	3:40
8.	"Blood on Kisses"	Warrior, Michelle Villanueva	Warrior, Villanueva	3:29
9.	"Downtown Hanoi"		Amberg	4:15
10.	"Dance Sleazy"	Warrior, Martin Eric Ain	Amberg, Bryant	3:32
11.	"Roses Without Thorns"		Bryant	3:26
Total length:				44:57

CD edition bonus tracks
No.	Title	Lyrics	Music	Length
12.	"Tease Me"		Amberg, Warrior	2:47
13.	"Mexican Radio (New Version)" (false live version, with crowd noise added to the mix)	Marc Moreland, Stan Ridgway	Moreland, Ridgway	3:32

== Personnel ==
Celtic Frost

- Tom Gabriel Warrior – lead and backing vocals, rhythm guitar, effects
- Oliver Amberg – lead and rhythm guitars, effects, backing vocals
- Curt Victor Bryant – bass, effects, backing vocals, lead guitar on track 11
- Stephen Priestly – drums, backing vocals

Additional musicians

- Michelle Villanueva – backing vocals, additional lead vocals on track 5
- Brian Hewett – rap on track 1, backing vocals on track 2
- Xavier Russell – backing vocals on tracks 1 and 11

Production

- Celtic Frost, Tony Platt – producers, arrangements, mixing at Conny Plank Studio
- Thomas Steeler, Dexter – assistant engineers
- Karl-Ulrich Walterbach – executive producer
