= Triptykon =

Swiss extreme metal band

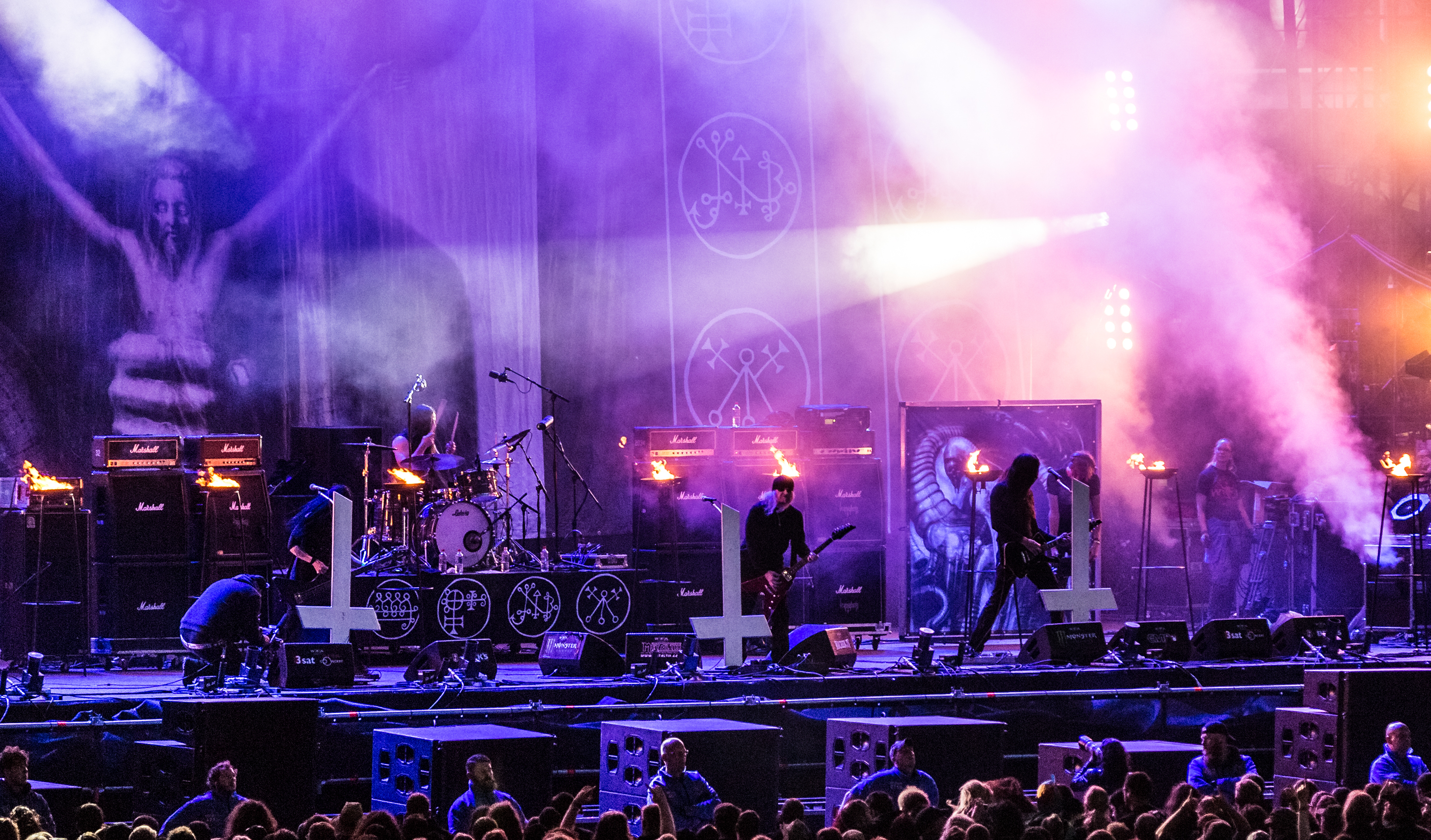
- Triptykon at Wacken Open Air 2016

Background information
- Origin: Zürich, Switzerland
- Genres: Doom metal; gothic metal; black metal; death metal; avant-garde metal
- Years active: 2008–present
- Labels: Prowling Death; Century Media; Sony Music
- Members: Thomas Gabriel Fischer; V. Santura; Vanja Slajh; Hannes Grossmann
- Past members: Reed St. Mark; Norman Lonhard
- Website: www.triptykon.net

Triptykon is a Swiss extreme metal band from Zürich, formed in 2008 by Thomas Gabriel Fischer, founding member of the pioneering heavy metal bands Hellhammer, Celtic Frost and Apollyon Sun.

== History ==
Fischer announced his departure from Celtic Frost in May 2008 and shortly afterwards revealed his new project would be entitled Triptykon. The name of the band is the Greek word for "triptych", and is aimed at stating that Triptykon is founding member Thomas Gabriel Fischer's third project after Hellhammer and Celtic Frost. The band logo is inspired by a writing pattern used during the time of the Weimar Republic.

Triptykon will sound as close to Celtic Frost as is humanly possible, and the album I am working on will feature all the material I envisioned for the successor to Celtic Frost's Monotheist. I desire the album to be a darker, heavier and slightly more experimental development of Monotheist. The first audio sample, for the song "Crucifixus", can be heard on the band's official Myspace page, among others.

— Thomas Gabriel Fischer

On 5 August 2009, Triptykon issued a press release indicating the recording of their debut album, Eparistera Daimones, would commence in the middle of August and continue through November, with a release in the spring of 2010.

On 21 December 2009, Triptykon issued a new press release to reveal Prowling Death Records Ltd. entered into a licensing agreement with Century Media Records to release Eparistera Daimones on 22 March 2010.

A follow-up EP, entitled Shatter, was released on 25 October 2010. A music video for the song Shatter has also been released.

It was announced on 22 October 2013 that the new album would be titled Melana Chasmata.

On 7 February 2014, Melana Chasmata's release date was revealed as being on 14 April 2014. The new album was received by music critics with a widely excellent critical response.

In early August 2017, Triptykon announced that drummer Norman Lonhard would be exiting the band, and that auditions for a replacement would soon be underway. Lonhard's final performance with the band was at the Party.San Open Air festival in Schlotheim, Germany on 12 August.

A live album, Requiem (Live at Roadburn 2019), was released in May 2020. Metal Hammer named it the 47th best metal album of 2020.

On 16 July 2024, it was announced that Triptykon is working on their third album for a 2025 release on Century Media/Sony Music Entertainment. They are due to perform a set of Celtic Frost tracks at Incineration Festival, London in May 2025.

== Members ==
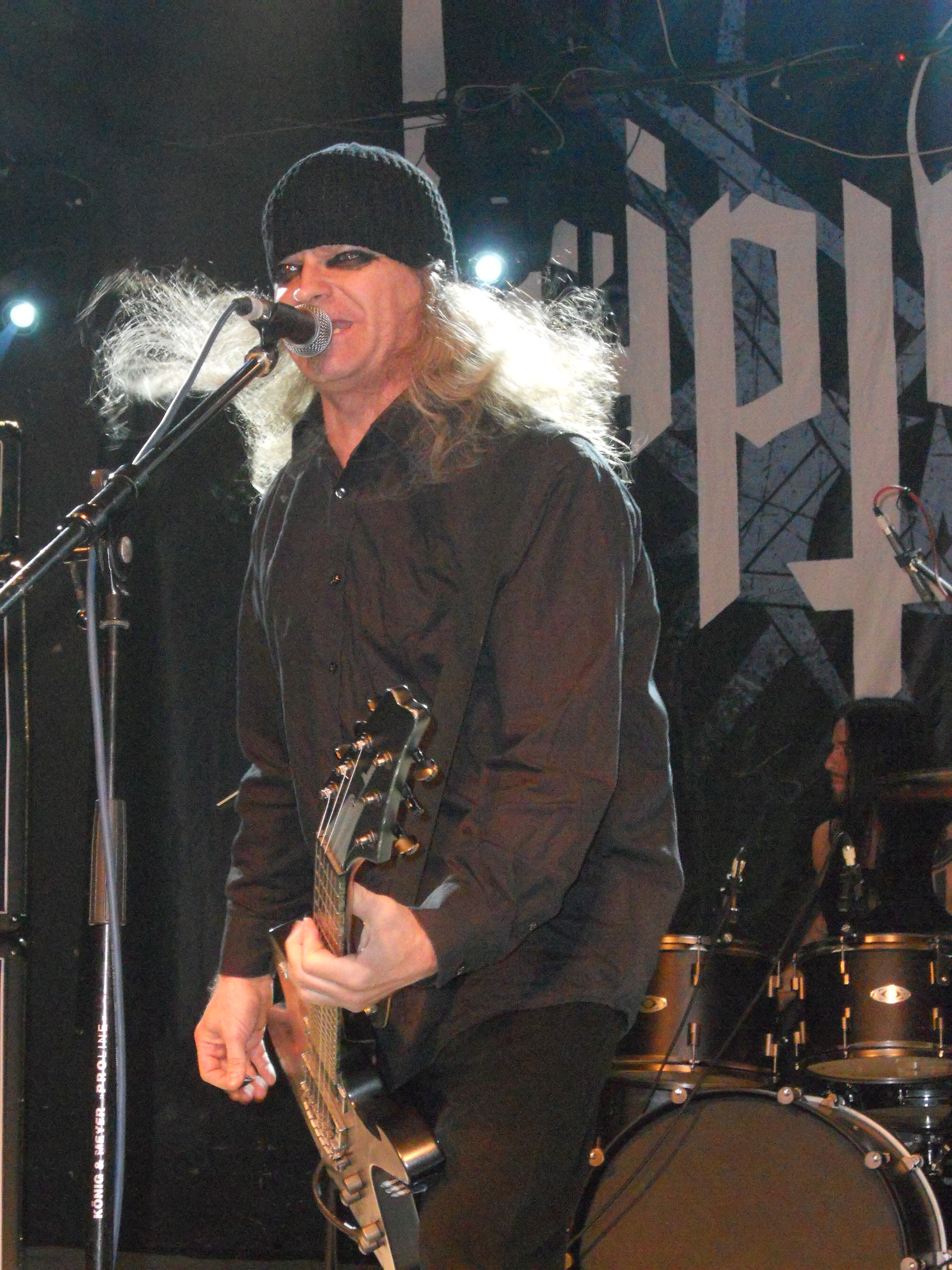
Thomas Gabriel Fischer in 2010

Current

- Thomas Gabriel Fischer – lead and backing vocals, rhythm guitar, programming (2008–present)
- Victor "V. Santura" Bullok – lead and backing vocals, lead guitar (2008–present)
- Vanja Slajh – bass, backing vocals (2008–present)
- Hannes Grossmann – drums, percussion (2018–present)

Former

- Reed St. Mark – drums, percussion (2008)
- Norman Lonhard – drums, percussion (2008–2017)

Timeline

== Discography ==
=== Studio albums ===
| Title | Album details | Peak chart positions | | | | | | | | Sales |
| Title | Album details | FIN | SWI | GER | JPN | NLD | FRA | US | UK | Sales |
|---|---|---|---|---|---|---|---|---|---|---|
| Eparistera Daimones | Released: 22 March 2010; Label: Prowling Death, Century Media; Formats: CD, LP, digital download | 28 | 73 | 81 | 32 | 98 | 21 | 198 | 134 | US: 1,300 |
| Melana Chasmata | Released: 14 April 2014; Label: Prowling Death, Century Media; Formats: CD, LP, digital download | 16 | 32 | 69 | 78 | 11 | 40 | 171 | 43 | US: 7,810 |
.

=== EPs ===
| Title | EP details | Peak chart positions |
| Title | EP details | FIN |
|---|---|---|
| Shatter | Released: 25 October 2010; Label: Prowling Death, Century Media; Formats: CD, LP, digital download | 8 |
"—" denotes a recording that did not chart or was not released in that territory.

=== Live albums ===
| Title | Album details |
|---|---|
| Requiem (Live at Roadburn 2019) | Released: 15 May 2020; Label: Prowling Death, Century Media; Formats: CD, LP, Digital Download |

=== Singles ===
| Title | Single details |
|---|---|
| Breathing | Released: 17 March 2014; Label: Prowling Death, Century Media; Formats: CD, LP |
