= Breathing (Triptykon song) =

Single by Triptykon

from the album Melana Chasmata
- B-side: "Boleskine House"
- Released: 17 March 2014
- Recorded: 2013/2014
- Genre: Doom metal, gothic metal, black metal, death metal, avant-garde metal
- Length: 12:59
- Label: Prowling Death/Century Media
- Songwriter(s): Thomas Gabriel Fischer
- Producer(s): Thomas Gabriel Fischer; V. Santura

"Breathing" is a single by Swiss extreme metal band Triptykon. Released on 17 March 2014 via Prowling Death Records/Century Media Records, it served as a teaser for their then-upcoming second full-length album, Melana Chasmata. It contains two tracks that eventually would appear in the album, "Breathing" and "Boleskine House".

== Content ==
Boleskine House is the name given to a manor in Scotland where famous occultist and founder of Thelema Aleister Crowley lived from 1899 to 1913.

== Track listing ==
No.	Title	Length
1.	"Breathing"	5:47
2.	"Boleskine House"	7:12
Total length:		12:59

== Personnel ==
Triptykon

- Thomas Gabriel Fischer — vocals, guitar
- V. Santura — guitar, vocals
- Norman Lonhard — drums, percussion
- Vanja Šlajh — bass, backing vocals

Miscellaneous staff

- Thomas Gabriel Fischer, V. Santura — production
- V. Santura — mastering
