= Emperor's Return =

EP by Celtic Frost
- Released: August 1985
- Recorded: October 1984 at Caet Studio in Berlin, Germany (tracks 2 and 3); April 1985 at Line in Recording Studio in Zürich, Switzerland (tracks 1, 4, 5)
- Genre: Thrash metal; black metal
- Length: 21:21
- Label: Noise (Europe); Enigma/Metal Blade (USA)
- Producer: Horst Müller, Rick Lights, Tom Warrior, Martin Ain, Karl Walterbach

Celtic Frost chronology
| Morbid Tales (1984) | Emperor's Return (1985) | To Mega Therion (1985) |

Emperor's Return is the second release by the Swiss extreme metal band Celtic Frost. It was released in 1985 as an extended play and was their first record featuring American drummer Reid Cruickshank (a.k.a. "Reed St. Mark"). The band's bleak publicity photographs from this period had an influence on the fashion and style of the developing black metal genre. The tracks of Emperor's Return were remastered and re-released in the 1999 edition of Morbid Tales and yet again remastered and included in the 2017 edition of To Mega Therion.

Professional ratings
Review scores
| Source | Rating |
|---|---|
| AllMusic | 3.5/5 stars |
| Collector's Guide to Heavy Metal | 6/10 |

== Track listing ==
Side one
| No. | Title | Length |
|---|---|---|
| 1. | "Circle of the Tyrants" | 4:29 |
| 2. | "Morbid Tales" | 3:29 |

Side two
| No. | Title | Length |
|---|---|---|
| 3. | "Dethroned Emperor" | 4:37 |
| 4. | "Visual Aggression" | 4:11 |
| 5. | "Suicidal Winds" | 4:36 |
| Total length: | | 21:21 |

== Personnel ==
Celtic Frost

- Tom G. Warrior – guitars, vocals, effects
- Martin Ain – bass, co-producer
- Reed St. Mark – drums (except "Morbid Tales" and "Dethroned Emperor")

Additional musicians

- Stephen Priestly – drums on "Morbid Tales" and "Dethroned Emperor"

Production

- Andrew Loyd – producer
- Horst Müller – engineer
- Karl Walterbach – technician
- Phil Lawvere – cover art
