= Christopher Krovatin =

American author

Chris Krovatin
- Born: June 24, 1985 (age 41); New York City, U.S.
- Education: Wesleyan University
- Occupations: Author; musician

Christopher Krovatin (born June 24, 1985) is an American author and musician living in New York City. He has published four novels – Heavy Metal and You (2006), Venomous (2008), Gravediggers: Mountain of Bones (2012, intended as the first in a series) and Frequency (2018) – and written for the heavy metal magazine Revolver Magazine.

== Early life ==
Christopher Krovatin was born in New York City to prominent attorney Gerald Krovatin and prize-winning author Anna Quindlen. His brother Quindlen Krovatin is also a published author.

== Career ==
Chris Krovatin began to write his first book, Heavy Metal and You, at age 16, after being hired as an intern for David Levithan. In 2007 he graduated from Wesleyan University and the following year he published his second novel, Venomous, about a teen, Locke Vinetti, whose rage might have a supernatural manifestation. Venomous has been adapted into a comic book by Dark Horse Comics, Deadlocke, and has been optioned as a screenplay.

Krovatin's third novel, not yet published, was the second acquisition made by Diane Salvatore after being made publisher of Broadway Books. It is in production.

In 2008 Krovatin began a stint working as an editorial assistant at Revolver magazine. He has since stopped working at the Revolver offices but is still a regular contributor, writing reviews and articles for their print and web arms, and writing his own regular feature for the Revolver blog, the "Final Six".

== Music ==
Krovatin is the singer of the Brooklyn, New York-based death metal band, Flaming Tusk, under the pseudonym "Stolas Trephinator". Krovatin has been the sole vocalist and lyricist since he joined in February 2008. He has full or partial lyrics credits on 7 of 8 of the tracks on their most recent LP, Old, Blackened Century.
