= Apollyon Sun =

Swiss industrial metal band

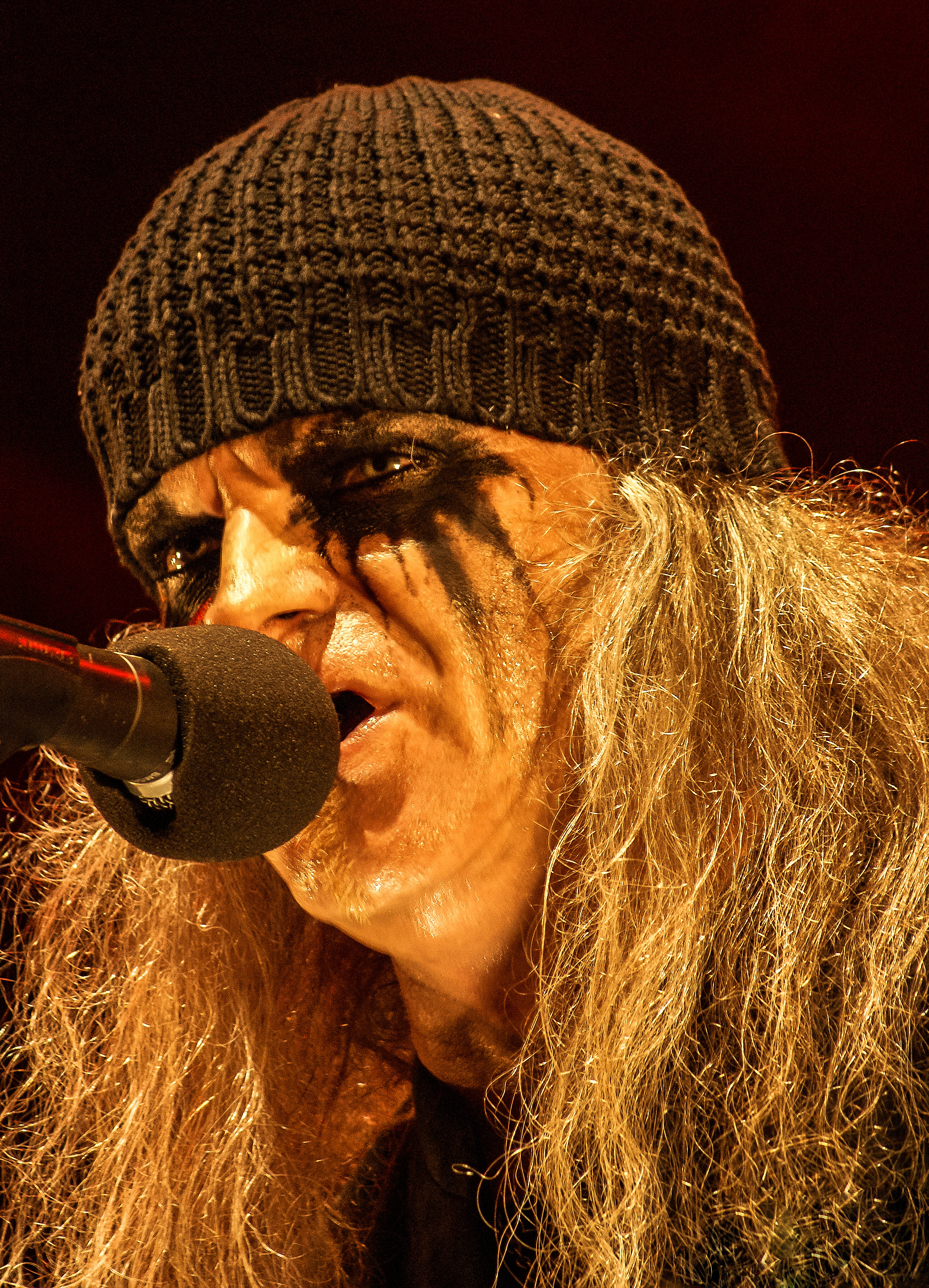
- Tom G. Warrior live at Hellfest 2011

Background information
- Origin: Zürich, Switzerland
- Genres: Industrial metal; trip hop
- Years active: 1995–2001
- Label: Mayan Records
- Past members: Thomas Gabriel Fischer ("Tom G. Warrior"); Erol Unala; Donovan John Szypura; Roger Muller; Dany Zingg; Stephen Priestly; Marky Edelmann
- Website: apollyonsun.com

Apollyon Sun was a Swiss industrial metal band formed by singer/guitarist Tom Gabriel Fischer and guitarist Erol Unala in early 1995, after the termination of Celtic Frost, Fischer's prior group. The group was unofficially dissolved in 2001 when Fischer invited Erol Unala to contribute to the reformation of Celtic Frost. Their name is taken from the Celtic Frost demo "Under Apollyon's Sun".

== History ==
The band were first discovered in 1997 by London-based Sanctuary Music Management, on the strength of their Industry Demonstration EP. Subsequently managed by Rod Smallwood and Merck Mercuriadis, Apollyon Sun released a five-track debut mini-album - God Leaves (And Dies) on London's Mayan Records in summer of 1998 and then contributed "God Leaves" and "Relinquished Body" for the soundtrack of top-rated BBC TV show City Central.

Work on a full album, Sub, began at London's Trident Studios that same year, with producer Roli Mosimann (Björk, Marilyn Manson, Faith No More). Further recording and mixing sessions took place at Manhattan's EastSide Sound, London's Nomis Studios, and at various studio locations in Switzerland. Sub features prominent final mixes by Mosimann, John Fryer (HIM, Nine Inch Nails), and Apollyon Sun themselves. Sub was released globally through Mayan Records in late summer 2000, after two years of studio work. Fall 2000 saw the band's first international concerts, among them a very radical and uncompromising show attached to the UK's "Kerrang! Awards", in London.

In 2001 and 2002, Apollyon Sun made further soundtrack contributions for the BBC, among them music for the high-profile TV production Red Cap with Tamzin Outwaithe. Unala and Fischer also participated in former Nirvana drummer Dave Grohl's (Foo Fighters) Probot album project. Co-written by Grohl, Fischer and Unala, the resulting song "Big Sky" features Fischer on vocals and Unala on guitars.

Work on Apollyon Sun's third album, tentatively titled Flesh, began as early as 2000, this time at the band's own newly expanded studio facilities in Switzerland as well as at Unala's and Fischer's home recording studios. The resurgence of Celtic Frost and the songwriting and recording work for Celtic Frost's first album in 13 years served to temporarily put Apollyon Sun on hiatus and interrupt work on Flesh - Celtic Frost had not only required Fischer's services again but also asked Unala to join the re-formed project as the band's guitarist and programmer.

Apollyon Sun's activities has remained on hold since Fischer and Unala departed for Celtic Frost. Guitarist Unala has not continued any Apollyon Sun activities since leaving Celtic Frost in 2006. Fischer has since stated he has no intention of contributing to Apollyon Sun again.

== Chronology ==
- 1995 - formation of the AS project by Fischer and Unala, out of the remains of avant-garde metal pioneers Celtic Frost (Vanity/Nemesis).
- 1997 - release of AS five-track Industry Demonstration CD to overwhelming media and industry response, and discovery of the band by Rod Smallwood and Merck Mercuriadis (Pet Shop Boys, Crispian Mills, Iron Maiden).
- 1998 - international release of AS debut EP God Leaves (And Dies) on Sanctuary Records/Mayan Records.
- 1998/99 - recording sessions for Sub album in London, New York, and Switzerland. Produced by AS and Roli Mosimann (Björk, Marilyn Manson, Faith No More), mixed by Mosimann and John Fryer (Nine Inch Nails, HIM). Soundtrack work for BBC TV, London.
- 2000- worldwide release of first full AS album Sub on Sanctuary Records.
- 2000 - international concert debut in London, England. "I have never seen anything that compares to Apollyon Sun's show" (Valerie Potter, Metal Hammer UK, 2000).
- 2001 - invitation to contribute a song to the "Probot" project by Dave Grohl (Nirvana/Foo Fighters).
- 2001 - continued songwriting and recording sessions for third album Flesh; further soundtrack work for BBC TV, London.

== Discography ==
- 1997 - Industry Demonstration (demo)
- 1998 - God Leaves (And Dies) (EP)
- 2000 - Sub (album)
- 2001 - Flesh (demo)
