= God Leaves (And Dies) =

EP by Apollyon Sun
- Released: 22 June 1998
- Recorded: 1996–1997
- Genre: Industrial metal; electronica; trip hop
- Length: 22:07
- Label: Mayan Records
- Producer: Apollyon Sun

Apollyon Sun chronology
Industry Demonstration (1997)	God Leaves (And Dies) (1998)	Sub (2000)

God Leaves (And Dies) is the debut EP by Swiss industrial metal band Apollyon Sun. It was released in 1998.

"God Leaves" and "The Cane" were taken from the band's 1997 Industry Demonstration and were remastered for this release. Written, arranged and produced by Apollyon Sun. Recorded at Greenwood Studios, Nunningen, Switzerland, and Artag Studio, Zurich, Switzerland, January 1998.

"Concrete Satan" includes samples from the film Scared Straight! (1980).

== Track listing ==
1. "God Leaves" – 4:30
2. "Reefer Boy" – 4:58
3. "The Cane" – 4:35
4. "Concrete Satan" – 3:47
5. "Bedlam and Blind" – 4:20
6. "Female Flight Attendant" - 5:37

== Personnel ==
- Tom Gabriel Fischer – vocals, guitars
- Erol Unala – guitars
- Roger Muller – synthesizer, programming
- Danny Zingg – bass
- Marky Edelmann – drums
