= Celtic Frost =

Swiss metal band

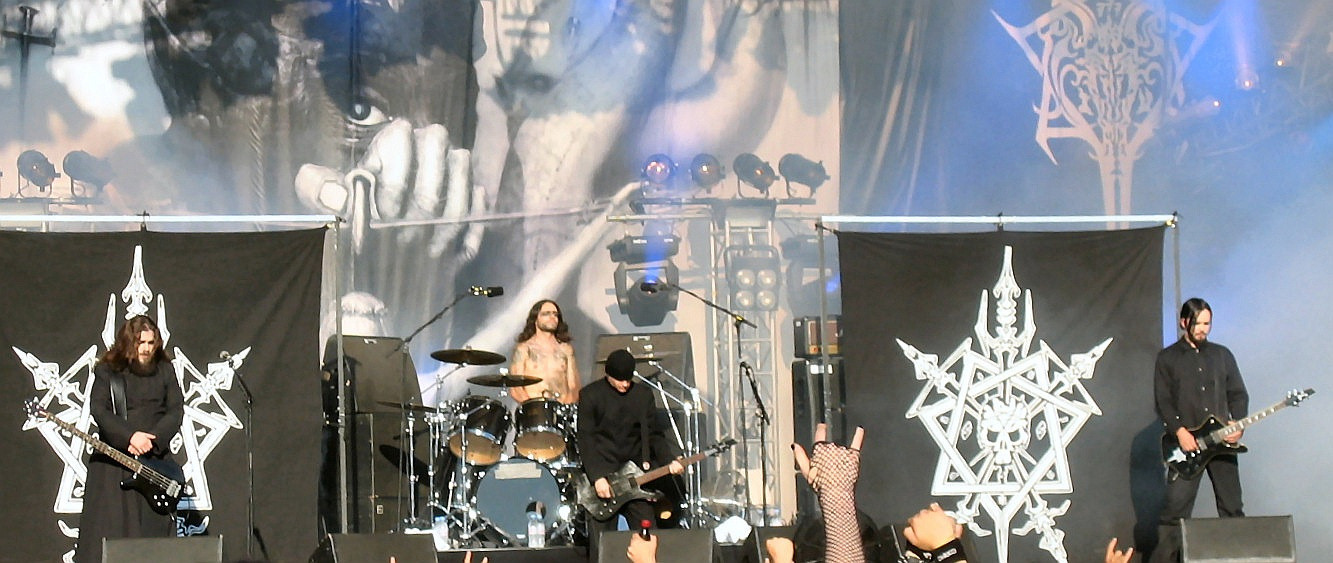
- Celtic Frost live at Tuska Open Air Metal Festival 2006. The band's distinctive skull-and-swords logo can be seen on the banners.

Background information
- Origin: Zürich, Switzerland
- Genres: Thrash metal; avant-garde metal; black metal; doom metal
- Years active: 1984–1987; 1988–1993; 2001–2008
- Labels: Century Media; Noise; Metal Blade
- Spinoffs: Triptykon
- Spinoff of: Hellhammer
- Past members: Thomas Gabriel Fischer; Martin Eric Ain; Franco Sesa; Isaac Darso; Stephen Priestly; Reed St. Mark; Ron Marks; Dominic Steiner; Curt Victor Bryant; Oliver Amberg; Erol Unala; Renee Hernz
- Website: celticfrost.com

Celtic Frost (/ˈkɛltɪk frɒst/) was a Swiss extreme metal band from Zürich. Their early work influenced extreme metal, especially death, black and doom metal. They are noted for their avant-garde approach.

Guitarist and vocalist Thomas Gabriel Fischer and bassist Martin Eric Ain formed Celtic Frost in June 1984, after disbanding their previous band, Hellhammer. Celtic Frost's debut record, Morbid Tales, was released later that year. It was followed by the albums To Mega Therion (1985) and the experimental Into the Pandemonium (1987). All three records were influential.

Their next album, Cold Lake (1988), featured a new lineup and a change of style that was criticized for its commercial and flamboyant tone, and has been disowned by the band. After releasing Vanity/Nemesis (1990), the group temporarily disbanded. Celtic Frost reformed in 2001 and released Monotheist (2006), which had a slower and heavier sound. They disbanded permanently in 2008, when Fischer left to form Triptykon.

The band's music included elements of various extreme metal styles. Their early work is classified as thrash metal or first-wave black metal with experimental tendencies, while their last album is described as doom metal. Celtic Frost drew inspiration from Black Sabbath, Judas Priest, and Venom, gothic rock acts like Bauhaus, Siouxsie and the Banshees, Christian Death, and Joy Division, as well as hardcore punk groups like Discharge and GBH.

== History ==
=== Formation and first recordings (1984–1987) ===
Celtic Frost's frontman, guitarist, and singer, Tom Gabriel Fischer, formerly of the band Grave Hill, adopted the alias Tom Warrior. With fellow Grave Hill and Tarot alumnus Steve Warrior (Urs Sprenger) on bass, he formed the early extreme metal band Hellhammer in May 1982. Steve Warrior was replaced by Martin Eric Ain, real name Martin Stricker. The band attracted a small international fan base, signed to Noise Records in Germany, and recorded their debut EP, Apocalyptic Raids, in March 1984.

Many metal-centered publications were skeptical of Hellhammer. Metal Forces loathed the group, sparking a feud between the zine and Warrior, which prevented Celtic Frost from performing in England for several years. Writers at Rock Power criticized Hellhammer as "the most terrible, abhorrent, and atrocious thing 'musicians' were ever allowed to record". They were "receiving miserable reviews everywhere", Fischer concluded.

Reflecting on his first band, Fischer said,

Way back in 1984 and 85, when Martin Eric Ain and I recorded Celtic Frost's first two albums Morbid Tales and To Mega Therion, Hellhammer stayed with us almost like a curse. Even though Hellhammer was the very reason we had reconsidered our goals and conceived the Frost, HH's remnants kept being significant obstacles in our path. Many people viewed Frost as simply a renamed version of the same band. The lack of musical quality in HH made it almost impossible for us to get an unbiased reaction for Frost. To make a long story short, it nearly destroyed all our work and dreams.

By May 1984, Hellhammer had disbanded. Fischer and Ain, initially with drummer Isaac Darso and later with session drummer Stephen Priestly, regrouped as Celtic Frost. Their 1984 debut EP, Morbid Tales, was well received in the underground metal scene, and the band toured Germany and Austria. This was followed by the EP Emperor's Return. Both of these early releases have been packaged together and are available on a single CD.

The next Celtic Frost recording was 1985's To Mega Therion, which did not feature Ain on bass, but instead used stand-in bassist Dominic Steiner. The cover artwork is a painting by H.R. Giger entitled Satan I, which Giger gifted to the band after corresponding with Fischer. The album influenced the emerging genres of death metal and black metal. Ain rejoined the band after the album was recorded.

=== Stylistic changes, internal struggles, and first breakup (1987–1993) ===
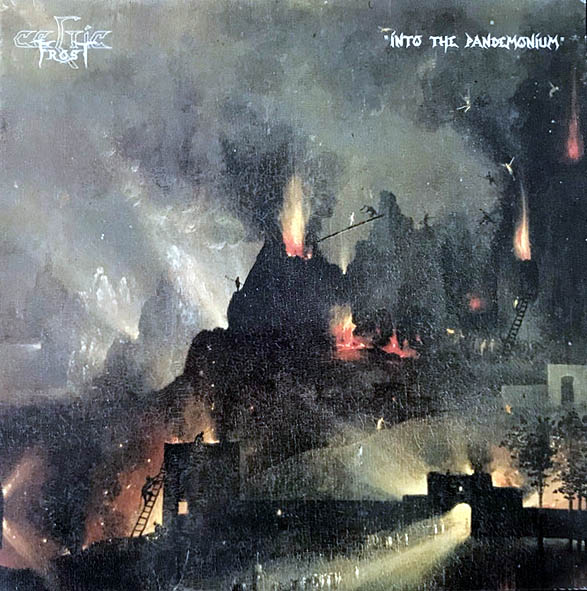
Into the Pandemonium was Celtic Frost’s second full-length album. It employs a variety of musical styles.

In 1987, Celtic Frost released their second full-length studio album, Into the Pandemonium. The album is eclectic compared to the band's previous works, featuring love songs, industrial rhythmic pieces, symphonic and operatic influences, female vocal parts, and a cover of Wall of Voodoo's "Mexican Radio."

The album is regarded as a departure from the band's earlier material, and helped solidify their avant-garde status. It shifted away from the heavier, direct style of Morbid Tales and To Mega Therion, although these albums also contained elements of experimentation and symphonic collaboration. Into the Pandemonium blends heavy metal with industrial and gothic rock, and includes an electronic body music-inspired rhythm, particularly in the song "One in Their Pride." Despite this stylistic evolution, the album retains sparse elements of extreme metal in Fischer's vocals and guitar.

During a North American tour, the band added second guitarist Ron Marks. Shortly thereafter, financial difficulties and tensions between band members and record label led to a brief dissolution of the group. Six months later, Warrior reformed the band with drummer Stephen Priestly, Oliver Amberg on guitars, and bassist Curt Victor Bryant. This lineup recorded the studio album Cold Lake, released in September 1988 by Noise Records. Despite being marketed to capitalize on the mass appeal of glam metal, the album was poorly received by fans of the band's extreme style.

Afterward, Bryant dismissed Amberg, leading to the return of former live guitarist Ron Marks for the recording of Vanity/Nemesis in 1990. Bassist Martin Eric Ain also returned. Celtic Frost's reputation never recovered from the backlash caused by Cold Lake. In 1992, the band's label released the collection of rare recordings Parched with Thirst Am I and Dying, the title of which is derived from an ancient Roman prayer. This compilation featured unreleased material, re-recorded versions of older songs, and studio session tracks.

A final proposed album, titled Under Apollyon's Sun, was never completed, although Fischer would later co-found a group called Apollyon Sun.

=== Post-breakup (1993–2001) ===
Several years after Celtic Frost disbanded, Fischer co-founded Apollyon Sun with Erol Unala on guitar. They recorded the EP God Leaves (And Dies), and a full-length album, Sub. Although rooted in Celtic Frost's experimental sound, Apollyon Sun was an industrial metal project. During his hiatus from metal music, Fischer wrote the autobiography Are You Morbid?, published by Sanctuary Publishing in 2000.

=== Reunion and Monotheist (2001–2008) ===
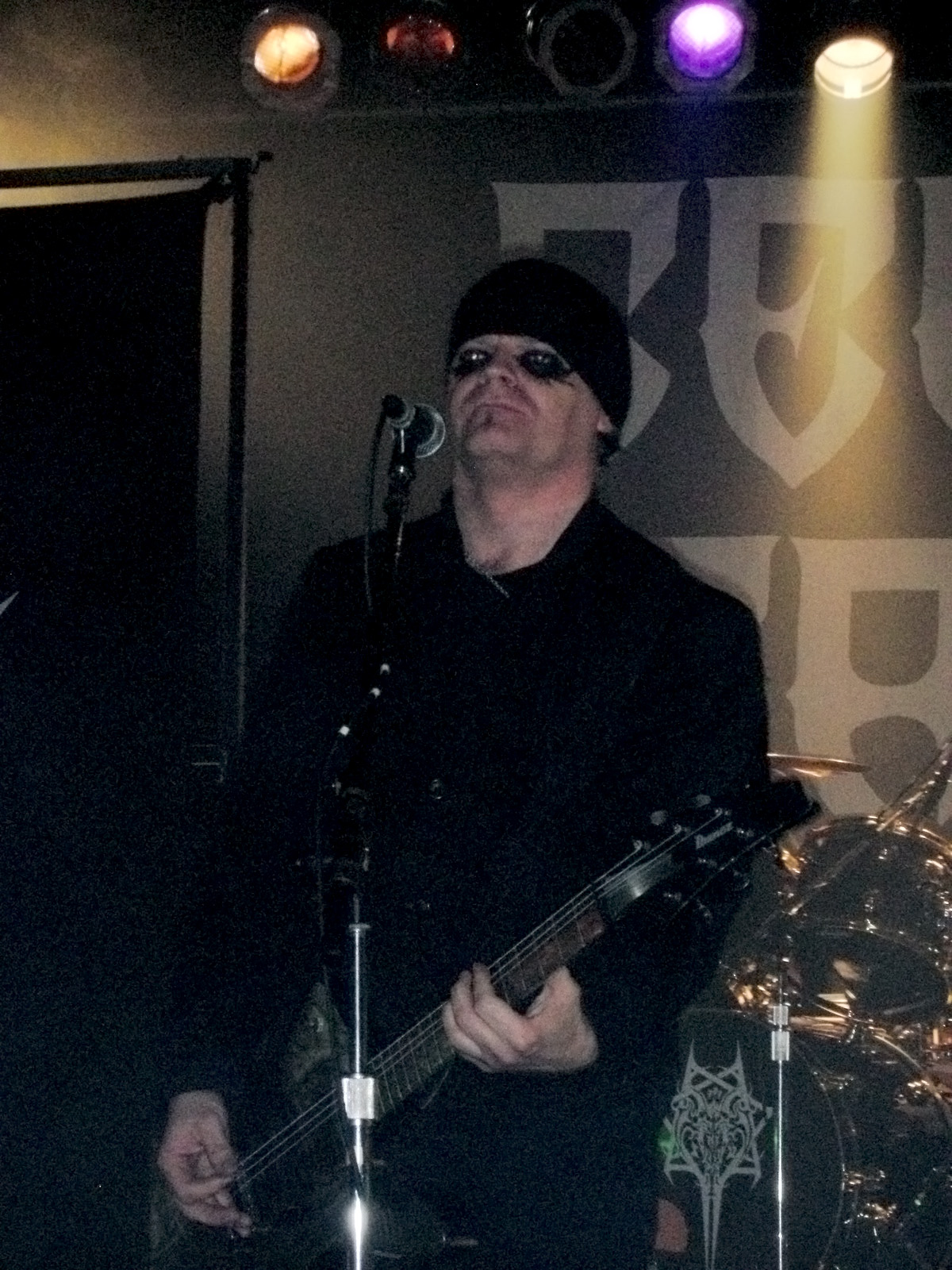
Tom Warrior performing in 2006

In late 2001, Fischer and Ain began writing music together, with Unala on guitar and, soon after in 2002, Swiss drummer Franco Sesa. They intended to record a dark and heavy album. The project took longer than anticipated, partly due to its DIY nature and its financing, but it resulted in what Fischer and Ain described as "perhaps the darkest album Celtic Frost has ever recorded."

The final Celtic Frost album was financed by the band through its own label, Prowling Death Records. This label had originally been self-founded to release the Hellhammer demos and manage Hellhammer's career in 1983 and 1984. The album was produced by Celtic Frost with Peter Tägtgren and mixed by Fischer and Ain. Celtic Frost and Prowling Death Records entered a worldwide licensing deal with Century Media Records. The album, Monotheist, was released in May 2006. It was well-received by critics and fans. While experimental and heavy, it is viewed as an evolution from the extreme metal developed on Morbid Tales and To Mega Therion, as well as the avant-garde style of Into the Pandemonium.

On 29 May 2006, Celtic Frost embarked on the most extensive tour of the band's career, the Monotheist Tour. They headlined festivals (e.g., Wacken Open Air) across Europe and the United States/Canada in 2006, followed by the group's first shows in Japan in early 2007. The European leg of the tour took place afterward, followed by a return to the United States to complete the tour with Type O Negative. Additional festival appearances and concerts continued in mid-2007.

On stage, Celtic Frost performed with an additional touring guitarist to handle rhythm guitar parts. This position was filled by Anders Odden, and later by V Santura.

=== Second breakup (2008–present) ===
There was no discussion of recording an album since the band's most recent breakup. Celtic Frost's final two performances took place in Mexico: one on 12 October 2007, in Monterrey, and the last on the following day in Mexico City.

Fischer resigned from Celtic Frost on 9 April 2008, with the following message displayed on the band's official website:

Celtic Frost singer and guitarist Tom Gabriel Fischer has left Celtic Frost due to the irresolvable, severe erosion of the personal basis so urgently required to collaborate within a band so unique, volatile, and ambitious.

After this announcement, bassist Martin Eric Ain stated that the band was "still alive, albeit in a coma of sorts." He added that the remaining members would not "continue recording or touring," as it would be "preposterous" without Fischer. Fischer formed Triptykon with Celtic Frost's touring guitarist V Santura, former Celtic Frost drummer Reed St. Mark, and bassist Vanja Slajh. Fischer stated that they would pursue a sound similar to Celtic Frost's final album, Monotheist.

On 9 September 2008, Celtic Frost's founding members Martin Eric Ain and Tom Gabriel Fischer confirmed that they had "jointly decided to lay Celtic Frost to rest for good".

On 21 October 2017, Martin Eric Ain died at the age of 50 following a heart attack.

In a 2021 interview with Heavy Culture, Fischer discussed the possibility of performing "one or two" Celtic Frost tribute shows in memory of Ain, featuring former members. He clarified that he had no interest in reforming the band since his departure, but might reunite former members for tribute shows: "Should this ever happen, it would not be a permanent project, nor would it be 'Celtic Frost,' despite the fact that it would comprise of Celtic Frost alumni. It would simply be a means to pay deference, perhaps for one or two concerts, to the deceased co-founder of the band." On 8 December 2022, Fischer's current band, Triptykon, announced they would perform a Celtic Frost tribute set during the Saturday special guest slot at Bloodstock Open Air Festival in the United Kingdom, following the withdrawal of Anthrax from that slot.

== Musical style and influences ==
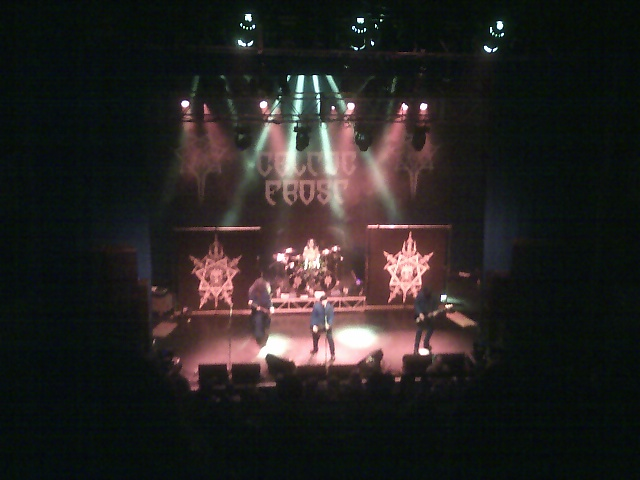
Celtic Frost performing in 2006

Celtic Frost's sound has undergone significant evolution over the years, making them difficult to categorize. The band's early work has been described as thrash metal and death metal, with Dan Epstein of Guitar World referring to Celtic Frost as "one of the leading lights in the European death metal movement." They are also often described as black metal, though some dissent, such as authors Axl Rosenberg and Christopher Krovatin, who argue that the band's "music was too tight, and its connection to old-school rock 'n' roll music too readily apparent, to be black metal." In some instances, Celtic Frost is described as avant-garde due to a combination of progressive, ambient, classical, and electronica elements in their music. Celtic Frost's later work, particularly Monotheist, has been described as doom metal.

Fischer has stated that two main genres influenced Celtic Frost: heavy metal and new wave. "In Heavy Metal, it's fair to say bands like Black Sabbath, Angel Witch, and Venom influenced us. Martin and I were heavily influenced by the New Wave music of the time too, such as Bauhaus, Siouxsie and the Banshees, Christian Death, and I think it's a mix of these musical directions that influenced the sound of Celtic Frost."

Ain was also noted for his interest in Joy Division, while Fischer's taste originated in a jazz and prog background. "I loved the '70s prog bands like Emerson, Lake & Palmer and early Roxy Music." The online music website The Quietus published an interview with Fischer about his favorite albums, comprising a list of 13 notable influences. At the top of this list was the album Gula Matari by Quincy Jones. Additionally, the band was influenced by the Beatles, Led Zeppelin, Killing Joke, and Rush.

== Imagery ==
The band's logo was designed by Celtic Frost founding member Martin Eric Ain. He explained the symbolism as follows:

It was of course inspired by the Crowley heptagram, and also by the Crowley tarot. You have the symbol of the swords in tarot ... And so the daggers make a pentagram, each one meaning like anger, failure, triumph, success ... So I combined the heptagram, Crowley's seal for the whore of Babylon, with the pentagram made by the daggers. And of course in the center is the skull, as a symbol of memento mori. In the realization of death, we are not eternal. ... where Crowley would have put, "Babylon", I put "Pazuzu", who is like an ancient Assyrian demon who also surfaces in the Necronomicon, who also comes up in the film The Exorcist. Pazuzu ... was actually a demon that was used to ward off even more evil spirits.

The number 5 5 5 around the skull in the band's logo refers to a book by Aleister Crowley, the Liber HAD.

The band were friendly with renowned Swiss artist H. R. Giger, who allowed them to use his painting Satan I as the cover of their album To Mega Therion.

== Legacy ==
When Fischer was asked to comment on Celtic Frost's influence on heavy metal, he replied: "No, I try to stay away from that. I'm a musician, I don't want to get involved with all that. It's not healthy. I want to do good albums. I'm still alive and I feel there's still so much in front of me. I don't want to be bothered with who has influence and where we stand and all that. I think it's a negative thing."

Nevertheless, the band has influenced metal musicians from around the world in a variety of subgenres and styles. In 2025, Matthew Thomas at Screen Rant wrote:

All the bands that make up the Big Four [i.e. Metallica, Megadeth, Slayer, and Anthrax] owe something to Celtic Frost. So do all the bands that would later embrace death, doom, progressive, and black metal. The Switzerland-based band were not only early progenitors of thrash, they also took the genre into uncharted territories, imbibing it with unbridled experimentation, plus a healthy dose of adventurous fun.

The staff of Loudwire ranked Celtic Frost at number 40 on a 2016 list of the top 50 metal bands of all time, especially noting the "widely influential" status of their first two EPs.

Metal bands that have either cited Celtic Frost as an influence or covered Celtic Frost include Darkthrone, Entombed, Tormentor, Godflesh, From Ashes Rise, Repulsion, Crowbar, Integrity, Rorschach, Shai Hulud, Deviated Instinct, Doom, Moonspell, Anthrax, Obituary, Death, Benediction, Brutal Truth, Neurosis, Eyehategod, Cradle of Filth, Marduk, Dimmu Borgir, Goatwhore, Sepultura, Cancer, Asphyx, Pro-Pain, Gorgoroth, Gallhammer, Paradise Lost, Evoken, and Napalm Death. Another pioneering Swiss extreme metal band, Coroner, featured Fischer as a guest vocalist on their 1985 demo and worked as road crew on Celtic Frost's 1986 tour of the United States.

The band Therion took its name from Celtic Frost's album To Mega Therion. Likewise, the underground hip-hop group Circle of Tyrants—a project of the rappers Necro, Ill Bill, Goretex, and Mr Hyde, with several metal musicians featured on their self-titled album—took its name from a Celtic Frost song and design inspiration for their logo from that of Celtic Frost.

Dave Grohl and Mark Tremonti have both stated on several occasions that Celtic Frost were an influence. Grohl consequently invited Fischer to participate in the recordings of his 2004 solo album, Probot, resulting in the song "Big Sky". Alternative country singer Ryan Adams has also claimed influence from Celtic Frost.

In 1996, Dwell Records released In Memory of Celtic Frost, a collection of Celtic Frost songs covered by other bands. Notable bands that appeared in this tribute include Enslaved, covering "Procreation of the Wicked"; Opeth, covering "Circle of the Tyrants"; Grave, covering "Mesmerize"; Slaughter, covering "Dethroned Emperor"; Apollyon Sun (featuring Fischer himself), covering "Babylon Fell"; Emperor, covering "Massacra", and Mayhem, covering "Visual Aggression". This hard to find CD is now out of print. In 2015, Corpse Flower Records released a tribute of their own entitled Morbid Tales! A Tribute to Celtic Frost. It too compiles a number of Celtic Frost covers by other bands, including Child Bite, Acid Witch, Municipal Waste, and Hayward, among others.

In 2018, British deathcore band Black Tongue covered the song "A Dying God Coming into Human Flesh" on their second album Nadir which was released on Halloween of 2018.

== Band members ==
Final lineup

- Thomas Gabriel Fischer – lead vocals, guitar (1984–1987, 1987–1993, 2001–2008)
- Martin Eric Ain – bass (1984–1985, 1986–1987, 1987, 1990–1993, 2001–2008; died 2017), backing vocals (1987, 1990–1993), lead vocals (2001–2008)
- Franco Sesa – drums, percussion (2002–2008)

Former members

- Isaac Darso – drums (1984)
- Dominic Steiner – bass (1985)
- Reed St. Mark – drums, percussion (1985–1987, 1987–1988, 1992–1993), backing vocals (1987–1988)
- Curt Victor Bryant – bass (1988–1990), guitar (1990–1993), backing vocals (1988–1993)
- Oliver Amberg – guitar, backing vocals (1988–1989)
- Erol Unala – guitar (2001–2005)
- Stephen Priestly – drums (1984, 1988–1992), backing vocals (1988–1992)

Former touring musicians

- Ron Marks – guitar (1987)
- Anders Odden – guitar (2006–2007)
- V Santura – guitar (2007–2008)

== Discography ==
Studio albums

- Morbid Tales (EP, 1984; re-released in 1999)
- To Mega Therion (LP, 1985; re-released in 1999)
- Into the Pandemonium (LP, 1987; re-released in 1999)
- Cold Lake (LP, 1988)
- Vanity/Nemesis (LP, 1990; re-released in 1999)
- Monotheist (LP, 2006) – US Ind No. 43, US Heat No. 37

EPs

- Emperor's Return (1985; re-released as part of Morbid Tales in 1999)
- Tragic Serenades (1986; re-released as part of To Mega Therion in 1999)
- I Won't Dance (1987)

Singles

- "Wine in My Hand" (Germany, 1990)

Compilations

- Parched with Thirst Am I and Dying (1992)
- Are You Morbid? (2003)
- Innocence and Wrath (2017)

Video albums

- Live at Hammersmith Odeon 3.3.89 (1989; VHS & Japanese Laserdisc)

Music videos

- "Circle of the Tyrants" (1986)
- "Cherry Orchards" (1988)
- "Wine in My Hand (Third from the Sun)" (1989)
- "Jewel Throne" (live) (1989)
- "A Dying God Coming into Human Flesh" (2006)

== Sources ==
- Bennett, J. (2009). "Chapter 3: Procreation of the Wicked". In Mudrian, Albert (ed.). Precious Metal: Decibel Presents the Stories Behind 25 Extreme Metal Masterpieces. Cambridge, Massachusetts: Da Capo Press. pp. 31–47. ISBN 978-0-306-81806-6 – via the Internet Archive.
- Bukszpan, Daniel (2003). "Celtic Frost". The Encyclopedia of Heavy Metal. New York: Barnes & Noble Publishing. p. 43. ISBN 978-0-7607-4218-1 – via Google Books.
- Fischer, Tom Gabriel (2000). Are You Morbid? Into the Pandemonium of Celtic Frost. London: Sanctuary Publishing Ltd. ISBN 1-86074-310-2 – via the Internet Archive.
- Gregori, Damien (April 2003). "Thrash Metal or, How I Learned to Stop Worrying and Love the Bomb". Terrorizer (108, "Thrash Special Part One"). Essex, UK: Dark Arts Ltd.: 10–14. ISSN 1350-6978.
- Larkin, Colin, ed. (1999). The Virgin Encyclopedia of Heavy Rock. London: Virgin Books. ISBN 0-7535-0257-7. OCLC 42023963 – via the Internet Archive.
- Rosenberg, Axl; Krovatin, Christopher (2017). Hellraisers: A Complete Visual History of Heavy Metal Mayhem. New York: Race Point Publishing. ISBN 978-1-63106-430-2 – via Google Books.
- Shapiro, Marc (1993). "The Birth of Death: A Speed Demonology" (PDF). Guitar for the Practicing Musician. Guitar Presents (#5, Speed Demons of Metal). Port Chester, New York: Cherry Lane Magazines, Inc.: 6–9, 23, 110–112. ISSN 1061-4400 – via the Internet Archive.
- Wagner, Jeff (2010). Mean Deviation: Four Decades of Progressive Heavy Metal. New York: Bazillion Points. ISBN 978-0-9796163-3-4 – via the Internet Archive.

== Bibliography ==
- Fischer, Tom Gabriel; Ain, Martin Eric (2010). Only Death Is Real: An Illustrated History of Hellhammer and Early Celtic Frost 1981–1985. New York: Bazillion Points. ISBN 978-0-9796163-9-6.
