= Erol Uenala =

Swiss musician

Erol Uenala, also known as Erol Unala, is a Swiss industrial and metal musician. He was a member of the industrial metal band Apollyon Sun and the thrash metal band Celtic Frost.

== Career ==
Uenala and his brother Kurt grew up in Aadorf, Switzerland.

Apollyon Sun were an industrial metal band co-formed by Uenala in early 1995. He played guitars on the following three Apollyon Sun recordings: 1998's God Leaves (And Dies) (EP); 2000's Sub and the Sub Sampler EP. For Celtic Frost, he played guitars and did electronic drum programming for the 2002 Prototype demo and for 2006's Monotheist single.
