= Monotheist (album) =

Studio album by Celtic Frost
- Released: 29 May 2006
- Recorded: 2002–2005
- Studio: Various: * Horus Sound Studio, Hanover, Germany * Oakland Recording, Winterthur, Switzerland * Celtic Frost Bunker, Zurich, Switzerland * Apollyon Sun Bunker, Zurich, Switzerland * Department of Noize, Kilchberg, Switzerland * FSK-18, Winterthur, Switzerland * Transmutation, Thalwil, Switzerland
- Genres: Experimental metal; black metal; doom metal; gothic metal
- Length: 68:16
- Label: Century Media
- Producers: Celtic Frost; Peter Tägtgren

Celtic Frost chronology
Parched with Thirst Am I and Dying (1992)	Monotheist (2006)

Monotheist is the sixth and final studio album by the Swiss extreme metal band Celtic Frost. Released in May 2006, it was the band's first new recording in 16 years. It received largely positive reviews.

== Development ==
Preparation and development for the project began in 2000. The first recording sessions for the album commenced in late October 2002. The band comprised founding members Martin Eric Ain (bass/vocals) and Tom Gabriel Fischer (vocals/guitars/keyboards), alongside guitarist and producer Erol Unala, who was Fischer's long-time songwriting partner. Unala became an increasingly significant contributor to Celtic Frost during the songwriting process. Working titles for the album included Probe and Dark Matter Manifest.

"Obscured" is derived from the demo track "November," which appeared on the 2002 demo album "Prototype."

"Drown in Ashes" features lyrics from the demo track "The Dying I."

== Music ==
Celtic Frost's earlier work blended elements of thrash metal and black metal. The sound of Monotheist has been characterized as challenging to define, as the songs range from doom metal to "blackened thrash" to gothic metal to symphonic metal. The result is a diverse yet consistently dark heavy metal experience. Don Kaye of Blabbermouth described it as "a monstrously heavy and oppressive slab of metal," venturing "into even heavier, blacker territory" than previous albums. Adrien Begrand of PopMatters remarked that the album approaches a masterpiece of "brutally heavy" metal, "completely devoid of light." Eduardo Rivadavia of AllMusic highlighted more nuanced elements, such as the "instantaneously infectious melody" of "A Dying God Coming into Human Flesh" and the "haunting female voices" that duet with bandleader Tom Warrior on "Drown in Ashes."

According to Fischer, some of the lyrics were influenced by the writings of the English occultist Aleister Crowley. This influence is evident in tracks such as "Os Abysmi Vel Daath," which is part of the title of one of Crowley's books.

== Release ==
Monotheist was released on CD and LP. A limited edition digipak included the bonus track "Temple of Depression." Both the vinyl LP version and the Japanese CD release included the bonus track "Incantation Against You."

A music video was created for the song "A Dying God Coming into Human Flesh."

== Reception ==
Professional ratings
Review scores
Source	Rating
AllMusic	3.5/5 stars
Aux Portes du Metal	64%
Blabbermouth	8/10
Chronicles of Chaos	8/10
El Portal del Metal	4.3/5 stars
Metal Crypt	4/5 stars
Metal.de (GER)	9/10
Metal Music Archives	4.4/5 stars
Metal Reviews	66%
Metal Storm	90%
Metal1 (GER)	10/10
Metalfan (NL)	80%
Media Assault	5/5 stars
Ox Fanzine (GER)	10/10
PowerMetal.de (GER)	8.6/10
Scene Point Blank	9/10
Sonic Seducer (GER)	7/10
Stormbringer (AT)	8/10
The Music (AU)	4/5

The album received positive reviews and is regarded as a successful comeback for the band. Blabbermouth awarded the record an 8/10, and its reviewer Don Kaye wrote:

The question regarding every comeback by a long-dormant group is always whether they can recapture the sound, vibe, and chemistry that made them successful the first time around. The answer here is yes: Fischer and Ain (along with new drummer Franco Sesa) have labored long and hard to create an album that ranks with their best work in terms of sheer heaviness and atmosphere, while employing some dramatic new musical ventures that honor the experimental side of the band. If the group's songs are less concise and perhaps not as catchy as earlier work, they're still propelled by sheer musical muscle and an epic, ambitious scope.

The album was ranked number 2 on Terrorizer's list of the best albums of the decade.

== Track listing ==
No.	Title	Lyrics	Music	Length
1.	"Progeny"	Thomas Gabriel Fischer	Martin Eric Ain, Fischer, Franco Sesa	5:01
2.	"Ground"	Fischer	Fischer, Erol Unala	3:55
3.	"A Dying God Coming into Human Flesh"	Ain	Ain, Fischer, Unala	5:39
4.	"Drown in Ashes"	Fischer	Fischer	4:23
5.	"Os Abysmi Vel Daath"	Ain, Fischer	Ain, Fischer, Sesa, Unala	6:41
6.	"Temple of Depression" (Limited edition digipak bonus track)	Fischer	Ain, Fischer, Unala	4:59
7.	"Obscured"	Ain, Fischer, Unala	Ain, Fischer, Unala	7:04
8.	"Incantation Against You" (Japanese version and vinyl LP bonus track)	Ain	Ain, Simone Vollenweider	5:06
9.	"Domain of Decay"	Fischer	Ain, Fischer, Unala	4:38
10.	"Ain Elohim"	Ain	Ain, Fischer, Sesa, Unala	7:33
11.	"Triptych: I. Totengott"	Ain	Fischer	4:27
12.	"Triptych: II. Synagoga Satanae"	Ain	Ain, Fischer, Sesa	14:24
13.	"Triptych: III. Winter (Requiem, Chapter Three: Finale)"	(instrumental)	Fischer	4:32

== Credits ==
- Thomas Gabriel Fischer – vocals, guitars, arrangements, programming
- Martin Eric Ain – bass, vocals (most vocals on "A Dying God Coming into Human Flesh", all vocals on "Triptych I: Totengott", and spoken parts on "Triptych II: Synagoga Satanae"), executive producer of the album
- Erol Uenala – guitars, engineer, additional programming on "Temple of Depression"
- Franco Sesa – drums

=== Session musicians ===
- Lisa Middelhauve (Xandria): guest vocals on "Drown in Ashes"
- Ravn (1349): backing vocals in the final chorus of "Temple of Depression"
- Simone Vollenweider – guest backing vocals on "Temple of Depression", additional vocals on "Obscured", and lead vocals on "Incantation Against You"
- Sigurd Wongraven (Satyricon): brief segment of lead vocals on "Triptych II: Synagoga Satanae"
- Peter Tägtgren – backing vocals on "Triptych II: Synagoga Satanae" and co-producer of the album
- Walter J.W. Schmid – engineering, mixing, mastering
- Phillip Schweidler – engineering, mixing

== Charts ==
Chart (2006)	Peak position
French Albums (SNEP)	194
German Albums (Offizielle Top 100)	67
Swiss Albums (Schweizer Hitparade)	41
UK Rock & Metal Albums (Official Charts)	14
US Independent Albums (Billboard)	43
