= Martin Eric Ain =

American-born Swiss bassist (1967–2017)

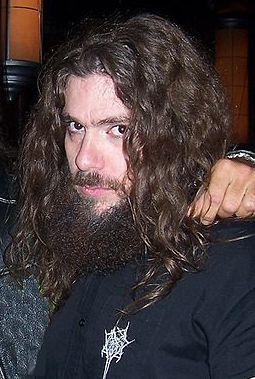

Background information
- Born: Martin Erich Stricker; July 18, 1967; Santa Barbara, California
- Origin: Switzerland
- Died: October 21, 2017 (aged 50) Switzerland
- Genres: Extreme metal; doom metal; thrash metal
- Occupation: Musician
- Instrument: Bass guitar
- Years active: 1984–2017
- Formerly of: Hellhammer; Celtic Frost; Tar Pond

Martin Eric Ain (born Martin Erich Stricker; July 18, 1967 – October 21, 2017) was a Swiss musician of American origin best known as the bassist of the influential extreme metal bands Hellhammer and Celtic Frost. He used the stage name Martin Eric Ain throughout.

== Biography ==
Ain was born in the United States and spoke English as a first language.

In May 1984, pioneering extreme metal band Hellhammer dissolved, but two of its members, guitarist/vocalist Thomas Gabriel Fischer and bassist Martin Eric Ain, went on to form Celtic Frost in June and release their debut, Morbid Tales, in November of that same year. This was followed by Emperor's Return and To Mega Therion in 1985, arguably their most influential record, which did not feature Ain on bass, but stand-in musician Dominic Steiner. Ain returned after the album was recorded. In 1987, the band released the highly experimental Into the Pandemonium.

After a subsequent North American tour, financial trouble, personal tension between the band members and an ill-fated relationship with their record label led to the dissolution of the band. Six months later, Thomas Gabriel Fischer reformed the band with a new line-up, of which Ain was left out, and went on to record the widely derided Cold Lake in 1988. Ain returned once again for the recording of Vanity/Nemesis in 1990, the band's last original album for several years.

Celtic Frost re-formed in 2001 and released the critically acclaimed Monotheist in 2006, before ultimately disbanding following frontman Tom Gabriel Fischer's departure in 2008.

Ain died on October 21, 2017, following a heart attack.

== Other activities ==
After amassing a small fortune in the 1980s from Celtic Frost's activities, Ain became an entrepreneur. He owned a successful DVD shop and bar in Zürich called Acapulco. Ain was also a co-owner of the music club Mascotte, which has become well known for hosting upcoming international bands. Since 2004, he had become the host of the "Karaoke from Hell" show, taking place every Tuesday night at the Mascotte.

Ain sang the lead vocals for the song "A Dying God Coming into Human Flesh" on Celtic Frost's final album, Monotheist. He played a left-handed Warwick bass for the second half of the band's career.

In 2012, the project "Lieder zum Schluss", under the moniker Graber, was released, a project he worked on with longtime friend Jan Graber.

In 2015, Ain started a band along with fellow musicians and artists from the Zürich scene: Thomas Ott (a Swiss comic artist), Markus Edelmann (ex-Coroner), Stefano Mauriello, and Alain Kupper. The songs written and recorded by the group were released after Ain's death under the band name Tar Pond in 2019. The album is entitled Protocol of Constant Sadness and contains four songs. The band Tar Pond continues with Monika Schori taking over bass duties after Ain's death.

In 2017, Ain collaborated with Swiss contemporary classical composer Balz Trümpy and his son Samuel Trümpy on "Der Dorn", which was released 2018. "Der Dorn" was released on a 7-inch vinyl, limited to 222 units.
