= To Mega Therion (album) =

- Cover art by H. R. Giger

Studio album by Celtic Frost
- Released: October 1985
- Recorded: 14–28 September 1985
- Studios: Casablanca, Berlin
- Genres: Thrash metal; black metal; doom metal; death metal
- Length: 39:52
- Label: Noise
- Producers: Horst Müller; Tom G. Warrior

Celtic Frost chronology
Emperor's Return (1985)	To Mega Therion (1985)	Tragic Serenades (1986)

To Mega Therion is the second studio album (Note: The band's debut Morbid Tales was initially released as a six-track EP, while the American release added two additional tracks as an LP. The band retrospectively refers to the American release as their first studio album.) by Swiss extreme metal band Celtic Frost, released in October 1985 through Noise Records. It was highly influential on death metal and black metal, and some consider it to be one of the best albums of the 1980s.

"To Mega Therion" translates to the great beast in Greek. It is an expression found in the Bible but was also a nickname used by Aleister Crowley. The cover artwork is a painting by Swiss artist H. R. Giger titled Satan I.

== Music ==
Sam Sodomsky of Pitchfork said To Mega Therion "spread apocalyptic visions over ungodly, vicious thrash metal." He further explained: "As subgenres began to harden into unified aesthetics, this music could not be pinned down: French horns, droning keyboards, and constantly shifting song structures assured that even the most devoted metalheads had never heard anything quite like it."

The album's horn sections have been described as "Wagnerian".

== Reception ==
Professional ratings
Review scores
Source	Rating
AllMusic	5/5 stars
Collector's Guide to Heavy Metal	8/10

Ned Raggett in his review for AllMusic wrote, "The bombastic 'Innocence and Wrath' starts To Mega Therion off on just the appropriate note – Wagnerian horn lines, booming drums, and a slow crunch toward apocalypse. ... With that setting the tone, it is into the maddeningly wild and woolly Celtic Frost universe full bore, Warrior roaring out his vocals with glee and a wicked smile while never resorting to self-parodic castrato wails. 'The Usurper' alone is worth the price of admission, an awesome display of Warrior's knack around brute power and unexpectedly memorable riffs." According to Raggett, "other prime cuts" include "Circle of the Tyrants", "Dawn of Megiddo", "Tears in a Prophet's Dream", "Eternal Summer" and "Necromantical Screams". Raggett concludes his review by stating that the album "is and remains death metal at its finest".

== Legacy ==
To Mega Therion was named one of "The Best 25 Heavy Metal Albums of All Time" in the book Sound of the Beast: The Complete Headbanging History of Heavy Metal, by Ian Christe.

The album was a major influence on the then-developing death metal and black metal genres.

Canadian journalist Martin Popoff considers the album "a black metal landmark" and "the most consistent example of early death metal that exists". He remarks how "the band had decided to delve more into the extreme" and praised Tom Warrior's "surprisingly accomplished" lyrics and the mix of death, black and doom metal with a pinch of ambient music.

Decibel magazine ranked To Mega Therion #21 in their "Decibel Thrash Top 50" list. Writer Nick Green praises both its "purer" thrash metal tracks such as "Circle of the Tyrants" and the experimental edge of "Necromantical Screams."

Sam Sodomsky of Pitchfork wrote in 2018: "Whatever response they elicited, Celtic Frost never seemed to care much: After all, they reminded us, we're all going to the same place anyway."

== Track listing ==
All tracks are written by Tom G. Warrior, except where noted.

Side one
No.	Title	Writer(s)	Length
1.	"Innocence and Wrath"		1:02
2.	"The Usurper"		3:24
3.	"Jewel Throne"		3:59
4.	"Dawn of Megiddo (Note: Consistently misspelled as Dawn of Meggido on re-releases.)"	Warrior, Martin Ain	5:42
5.	"Eternal Summer"		4:29

Side two
No.	Title	Writer(s)	Length
6.	"Circle of the Tyrants"		4:36
7.	"(Beyond the) North Winds"		3:04
8.	"Fainted Eyes"		5:00
9.	"Tears in a Prophet's Dream"	Celtic Frost, Steve Warrior	2:30
10.	"Necromantical Screams"	Warrior, Ain	6:06
Total length:			39:52

== Personnel ==
Celtic Frost

- Tom G. Warrior – vocals, guitars, sound effects
- Dominic Steiner – bass, sound effects
- Reed St. Mark – drums, percussion, sound effects

Additional musicians

- Wolf Bender – French horn (tracks 1, 4 and 10)
- Claudia-Maria Mokri – operatic vocals (tracks 2, 6 and 10)
- Horst Müller – sound effects (track 9)
- Urs Sprenger – sound effects (track 9)

Production

- Horst Müller – producer, engineer, mixing
- Rick Lights – assistant engineer
- Tom G. Warrior – assistant engineer
- Karl Walterbach – executive producer
