= Morbid Tales =

EP and studio album by Celtic Frost
- Released: November 1984
- Recorded: 8–15 October 1984
- Studios: Caet Studio in Berlin, Germany
- Genres: Thrash metal; black metal
- Length: 24:51; 32:09 (1985 US ed.); 50:02 (1999 ed.)
- Labels: Noise (Europe); Enigma/Metal Blade (US)
- Producers: Horst Müller, Tom Warrior, Martin Ain, Karl Walterbach

Celtic Frost chronology
Morbid Tales (1984)	Emperor's Return (1985)

Celtic Frost album chronology
Morbid Tales (1985)	To Mega Therion (1985)

1999 CD edition
- The 1999 reissue of Morbid Tales is remastered and expanded to include the tracks from the band's subsequent EP Emperor's Return

Professional ratings
Review scores
Source	Rating
AllMusic	4.5/5 stars
Collector's Guide to Heavy Metal	5/10

Morbid Tales is the debut EP and album by the Swiss extreme metal band Celtic Frost. Its original European release in November 1984 through Noise Records was a mini-LP with six tracks. The following year, an American edition on LP and cassette—released through Enigma and Metal Blade Records, respectively—added two tracks, which brought it to the length of a regular studio album. The band retrospectively regards the extended 1985 version of Morbid Tales as their debut album—a place in their discography otherwise held by To Mega Therion (1985), which was always a full-length album from its original release.

In 1999, Noise Records remastered and reissued Morbid Tales as an extended CD that also included the tracks from their 1985 EP Emperor's Return. In 2017, a remastered edition was released by the same label on CD and vinyl formats.

== Legacy ==
The thrash metal intensity of Morbid Tales had a major influence on the then-developing death metal and black metal genres, along with Under the Sign of the Black Mark by Bathory and Seven Churches by Possessed. It included elements that were adopted by the pioneers of both styles. The band's bleak and dead serious fashion style was also influential, including their corpse paint face makeup.

In 2011, Invisible Oranges ranked Morbid Tales as #2 in the list of top 10 albums recorded with guitars tuned to E standard.

In 2014, J. Andrew of Metal Injection wrote: "In a way, Celtic Frost (along with Hellhammer) could really go on any essential listening list for extreme metal. They've been so influential to thrash, death, and black metal that they transcend any tight, genre-specific limitations. And though To Mega Therion is often considered their signature musical achievement, Morbid Tales offers a glimpse into the raw beginnings of what many of us fans now take for granted. [...] Morbid Tales marks an important moment in the mid-1980s where signs of what was to come with extreme music began to emerge."

In 2017, Rolling Stone ranked Morbid Tales as 28th on their list of 'The 100 Greatest Metal Albums of All Time.' Decibel placed Morbid Tales at #14 in their "Decibel Thrash Top 50". Contributor Jeff Wagner wrote about how the LP was "Hellhammer refined, but no less demented", and that it "remains as pure and primal as Celtic Frost would ever be." In 2013, Decibel ranked Morbid Tales at number 28 on its list of the Top 100 Black Metal Albums of All Time.

In the commentary for Darkthrone's album Panzerfaust, Fenriz cites this album along with Bathory's Under the Sign of the Black Mark and Vader's Necrolust as key riff inspirations.

"Danse Macabre" was later sampled in the demo track "Totgetanzt" from their 2002 demo album Prototype.

== Track listings ==
All music by Thomas Gabriel Fischer, all lyrics by Thomas Gabriel Fischer and Martin Ain, except where noted.

=== Original Mini-LP version ===
Side one
No.	Title	Length
1.	"Into the Crypts of Rays" (Fischer)	4:46
2.	"Visions of Mortality"	4:49

Side two
No.	Title	Length
3.	"Procreation (Of the Wicked)"	4:02
4.	"Return to the Eve"	4:05
5.	"Danse Macabre"	3:51
6.	"Nocturnal Fear"	3:35
Total length:		24:51

=== Full-LP American version ===
Side one
No.	Title	Length
1.	"Into the Crypts of Rays" (Fischer)	3:39
2.	"Visions of Mortality"	4:49
3.	"Dethroned Emperor" (Fischer)	4:37
4.	"Morbid Tales"	3:29

Side two
No.	Title	Length
5.	"Procreation (Of the Wicked)"	4:04
6.	"Return to the Eve"	4:07
7.	"Danse Macabre"	3:52
8.	"Nocturnal Fear"	3:36
Total length:		32:09

=== 1999 CD remastered edition ===
No.	Title	Length
1.	"Human (Intro)" (intro to "Into the Crypts of Rays"; originally joined as one track, CD reissue split this into two tracks)	0:41
2.	"Into the Crypts of Rays"	3:39
3.	"Visions of Mortality"	4:49
4.	"Dethroned Emperor"	4:37
5.	"Morbid Tales"	3:29
6.	"Procreation (Of the Wicked)"	4:04
7.	"Return to the Eve"	4:07
8.	"Danse Macabre"	3:51
9.	"Nocturnal Fear"	3:36
10.	"Circle of the Tyrants"	4:27
11.	"Visual Aggression"	4:10
12.	"Suicidal Winds"	4:36
Total length:		50:02

=== 2017 remastered edition bonus tracks ===
No.	Title	Length
10.	"Morbid Tales (1984 Rehearsal)"	3:41
11.	"Messiah (1984 Rehearsal)"	4:45
12.	"Procreation (Of the Wicked) (1984 Rehearsal)"	4:14
13.	"Nocturnal Fear (1984 Rehearsal)"	3:54

== Personnel ==
Credits adapted from the original editions.

Celtic Frost

- Tom Warrior – guitars, lead vocals, co-producer
- Martin Ain – bass, bass effects, vocals, co-producer
- Reed St. Mark – drums on tracks 10–12 (remastered edition)

Additional musicians

- Stephen Priestly – session drums
- Horst Müller – additional vocals (tracks 3, 5 & 7)
- Hertha Ohling – additional vocals (track 6)
- Oswald Spengler – violin (tracks 7 & 8)

Production

- Horst Müller – producer, engineer, mixing, mastering
- Karl Walterbach – executive producer

== Bibliography ==
- Wagner, Jeff (November 2011). "Decibel Thrash Top 50: #14 - CELTIC FROST - Morbid Tales". Decibel (Decibel Thrash Hall of Fame Special Issue). Philadelphia, Pennsylvania, U.S.: 5–11. ISSN 1557-2137.
