= Dave Lombardo discography =

This is the discography of Dave Lombardo, a Cuban American drummer and a co-founding member of the American thrash metal band Slayer.

== Discography ==
| Date of release | Title | Label | Credited for |
|---|---|---|---|
| 1994 | Voodoocult (with Philip Boa): Jesus Killing Machine | | |
| June 8, 1999 | Testament: The Gathering | Burnt Offerings / Spitfire Records | drums |
| 1999 | Lorenzo Arruga, Dave Lombardo & Friends: Vivaldi: the meeting | | |
| 2003 | Apocalyptica: Reflections | Universal Music Group | drums on "Prologue", "No Education", "Somewhere Around Nothing", "Resurrection" and "Cortège" |
| 2005 | Apocalyptica: Apocalyptica | Universal Music Group | drums on "Betrayal" |
| 2005 | DJ Spooky vs. Dave Lombardo: Drums of Death | Thirsty Ear | drums |
| 2007 | Apocalyptica: Worlds Collide | Universal Music Group | drums on "Last Hope" |

=== with Fantômas ===
| Date of release | Title | Label | Catalog number |
|---|---|---|---|
| April 26, 1999 | Fantômas (aka 'Amenaza Al Mundo') | Ipecac Recordings | IPC-001 |
| July 9, 2001 | The Director's Cut | Ipecac Recordings | IPC-017 |
| April 1, 2002 | Millennium Monsterwork 2000 w/The Melvins | Ipecac Recordings | IPC-019 |
| January 27, 2004 | Delìrium Còrdia | Ipecac Recordings | IPC-045 |
| April 5, 2005 (Limited Edition); June 14, 2005 | Suspended Animation | Ipecac Recordings | IPC-062 (Limited Edition); IPC-065 |

=== with Grip Inc. ===
| Date of release | Title | Label |
|---|---|---|
| March 7, 1995 | Power of Inner Strength | SPV |
| February 25, 1997 | Nemesis | SPV |
| February 23, 1999 | Solidify | SPV |
| March 16, 2004 | Incorporated | SPV |

=== with John Zorn ===
| Date of release | Title | Label |
|---|---|---|
| 1999 | Taboo & Exile | Tzadik Records |
| 2000 | Xu Feng | Tzadik Records |
| 2025 | Memories, Dreams and Reflections | Tzadik Records |

=== as Dave Lombardo ===
| Date of release | Title | Label |
|---|---|---|
| May 5, 2023 | Rites of Percussion | Ipecac Recordings |

=== with Slayer ===
| Date of release | Title | Label | US Billboard Peak | US sales |
|---|---|---|---|---|
| December, 1983 | Show No Mercy | Metal Blade Records | | |
| 1984 | Haunting the Chapel (EP) | Metal Blade Records | | |
| 1984 | Live Undead (Live) | Metal Blade Records | | |
| March, 1985 | Hell Awaits | Metal Blade Records | | |
| October, 1986 | Reign in Blood | Def Jam Records | 94 | |
| July 5, 1988 | South of Heaven | Def Jam Records | 57 | |
| October 9, 1990 | Seasons in the Abyss | Def American Records | 40 | |
| October 22, 1991 | Decade of Aggression (Double live) | Def American Records | 55 | |
| November 25, 2003 | Soundtrack to the Apocalypse (Box set) | American Recordings | | |
| October 26, 2004 | Still Reigning (Home video) (Live) | American Recordings | | |
| June 6, 2006 | Eternal Pyre (EP) | American Recordings | | |
| August 8, 2006 | Christ Illusion | American Recordings | 5 | |
| November 9, 2009 | World Painted Blood | American Recordings | 12 | |
