= Enemy of the Sun (band) =

German metal band

- Origin: Germany
- Genres: Thrash metal, sludge metal
- Years active: 2006–present
- Labels: The End
- Members: Jules Näveri; Waldemar Sorychta; Absinthe Green; Daniel Zeman
- Past members: Alla Fedynitch
- Website: enemyofthesun.com

Enemy of the Sun is a German metal band formed in 2006.

== History ==
The band was founded in 2006 and named after the Neurosis album of the same name. Their most famous member is Waldemar Sorychta, who had previously played in bands like Despair, Grip Inc. and Voodoocult and who made a name in producing many metal bands in the 1990s. At the moment, Sorychta is also member of the gothic metal band Eyes of Eden. The female bass player Alla Fedynitch was a touring bass player with Pain and is a member of Eyes of Eden as well. The Finnish lead singer Jules Näveri and their drummer Daniel Zeman were playing in less known bands before joining Enemy of the Sun.

In the beginning of 2007 the band recorded a demo, which was honored from Rock Hard as well as Metal Hammer as "Demo of the Month". In June 2007 the band was support act for Megadeth at their show in Hamburg, Germany.

Their debut album Shadows, which was produced by Waldemar Sorychta, was released on 7 December 2007 and was regarded as "Album of the Month" by Rock Hard. In the Summer of 2008 they performed at Wacken Open Air, With Full Force and the Summer Breeze Open Air Festival.

In April 2011 there was a line up change:Alla Fedynitch was replaced by Eirini "Absinthe Green" who took on the bass duties for the band. Eirini made her live debut with Enemy Of The Sun in Dortmund at the Rock in den Ruinen Festival on 30 April 2011.

== Discography ==
- Shadows (2007)
- Caedium (2010)
