= Despair (band) =

German thrash metal band

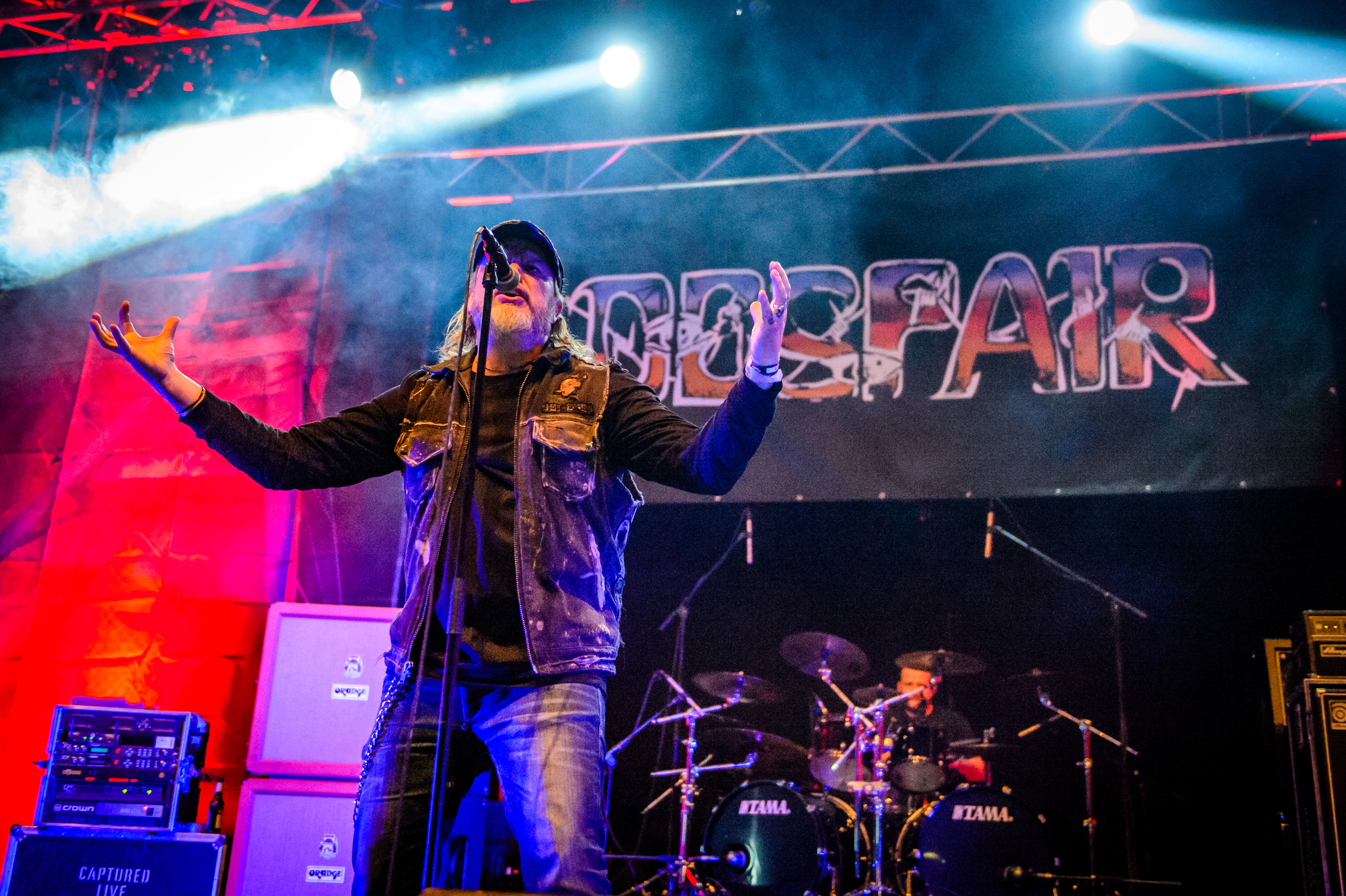

Background information
- Origin: Dortmund, Germany
- Genres: Thrash metal
- Years active: 1986–1993, 2017–present
- Labels: Century Media
- Members: Markus Freiwald; Waldemar Sorychta; Marius Ickert; Marc Grewe
- Past members: Marek Greschek (deceased); Andreas Hentschel; Robert Kampf; Klaus Pachura; Thomas "Donald" König

Despair is a thrash metal band from Dortmund, Germany.

== History ==
=== Original line-up ===
The group was formed in Dortmund in 1986 with Robert Kampf on vocals, Klaus Pachura on bass, Thomas "Donald" König on drums, and Waldemar Sorychta and Marek Greschek on guitar. The following year, they released the demo Surviving You Always. König was replaced shortly after by 16-year-old drummer Markus Freiwald. Kampf launched Century Media Records in 1988 and Despair's History of Hate was the first album released by the label.

In 1989, Andreas Henschel replaced Kampf at the microphone when the latter decided to devote himself to Century Media. The label went on to release the group's other two albums, Decay of Humanity (1990) and Beyond All Reason (1992). Sorychta was in charge of production on History of Hate and was the principal composer. Kampf began hiring his colleague to produce other bands on his label, with Sorychta producing albums and EPs for Unleashed, Crows, Tiamat, Asphyx and Samael.

=== After Despair ===
Despair disbanded in 1993. Sorychta went on to pursue a prolific career as a producer, often in association with Century Media. He formed Grip Inc. with Dave Lombardo with whom he worked on the first album by the supergroup Voodoocult. Sorychta founded Eyes of Eden and Enemy of the Sun in the 2000s as Grip Inc. dissolved. He produced Sodom's In War and Pieces in 2010.

Freiwald joined bands such as Flaming Anger, Everflow and Voodoocult. He became the session drummer for Century Media groups. He also replaced Ventor in Kreator for the Endorama European tour in 1999. Bernemann contacted him in 2010, to announce that Bobby Schottkowski had decided to leave Sodom because of the deterioration of his relationship with Tom Angelripper. His debut album with Sodom was Epitome of Torture, also produced by Sorychta.

Marek Greschek committed suicide in 2013.

=== Revival ===
Robert Kampf announced a reformation of Despair which was to include Sorychta and Freiwald in November 2004. There was no follow-up to Kampf's announcement.

In September 2017, it was Sorychta's turn to announce the return of Despair. Freiwald is still behind the drums, but Marc Grewe of Morgoth took over as lead singer. Grewe had been a backing vocalist on the band's second and third albums. Marius Ickert of the band In Weak Lights was hired on bass. The band is recording what Sorychta calls a rewrite of the album History of Hate.

== Discography ==
- Surviving You Always (1987) – demo
- History of Hate (1988)
- Decay of Humanity (1990)
- Beyond All Reason (1992)
