= Nestler =

Nestler is a surname. Notable people with the surname include:

- Britta Nestler (born 1972), German materials scientist
- Chrétien Géofroy Nestler (1778–1832), French botanist and pharmacist
- Christine Nestler (born 1940), German cross-country skier
- Elisabeth Nestler (born 1951), Austrian figure skater
- Eric J. Nestler, American neuroscientist and academic
- Gaby Nestler, East German cross-country skier
- Gerry Nestler, American musician
- Johann Karl Nestler (1783–1842), Czech-German scientist
- Vincenzo Nestler (1912–1988), Italian chess player
