= Mourn the Southern Skies =

Studio album by Exhorder
- Released: September 20, 2019
- Recorded: 2019
- Studio: OCD Recording and Production, Metairie, Louisiana
- Genre: Thrash metal; groove metal
- Length: 52:52
- Label: Nuclear Blast
- Producer: Vinnie LaBella (exec.), Duane Simoneaux

Exhorder chronology
The Law (1992)	Mourn the Southern Skies (2019)	Defectum Omnium (2024)

Professional ratings
Review scores
Source	Rating
Kerrang!	4/5 stars

Mourn the Southern Skies is the third studio album by American metal band Exhorder, released on September 20, 2019 through Nuclear Blast. It is the band's first studio release in 27 years, after their 1992 album The Law. This is also the last album to feature founding lead guitarist Vinnie LaBella, who left the band in February 2020, and their only album with rhythm guitarist Marzi Montazeri, who would leave Exhorder two years later.

== Overview ==
In November 2017, Exhorder reunited after a six-year hiatus under a new management deal with the All Independent Service Alliance (AISA). A new lineup was formed, with bassist Jason VieBrooks (formerly of Heathen and Grip Inc.), drummer Sasha Horn of Forbidden, and guitarist Marzi Montazeri (formerly of Superjoint Ritual and Philip H. Anselmo & The Illegals), with vocalist Kyle Thomas and guitarist Vinnie LaBella as the only two remaining original members. In February 2018, they performed two shows at the Saint Vitus Bar in Brooklyn, New York City, and later that year, they signed with Nuclear Blast. In July 2019, the band released the single "My Time", and announced that Mourn the Southern Skies is to be released on September 20, 2019.

The album contains a re-recording of "Ripping Flesh", a song taken from their 1986 demo album Get Rude. Chris Nail, former drummer of the band, played drums on the re-recording.

== Track listing ==
All lyrics are written by Kyle Thomas, except "Ripping Flesh" written by Vinnie LaBella; all music is composed by LaBella, except "Rumination" composed by LaBella and Jason VieBrooks.

No.	Title	Length
1.	"My Time"	3:53
2.	"Asunder"	4:57
3.	"Hallowed Sounds"	5:07
4.	"Beware the Wolf"	3:54
5.	"Yesterday's Bones"	7:04
6.	"All She Wrote"	5:04
7.	"Rumination"	4:33
8.	"The Arms of Man"	5:49
9.	"Ripping Flesh" (re-recorded from the Get Rude demo)	3:02
10.	"Mourn the Southern Skies"	9:29
Total length:		52:52

== Personnel ==
Credits are adapted from the album's liner notes.

Exhorder

- Kyle Thomas – vocals
- Vinnie LaBella – lead guitar
- Marzi Montazeri – rhythm guitar
- Jason VieBrooks – bass
- Sasha Horn – drums

Additional musicians

- Mikey "B3" Burkart – organ (tracks 5, 10)
- Chris Nail – drums (track 9)

Production

- Vinnie LaBella – executive production
- Duane Simoneaux – production, recording
- Jens Bogren – mixing, mastering
- Tony Lindgren – mastering
- Travis Smith – artwork
- Dante Torrieri – photography

== Charts ==
Chart (2019)	Peak position
German Albums (Offizielle Top 100)	61
Scottish Albums (OCC)	83
Swiss Albums (Schweizer Hitparade)	65
