= Jason VieBrooks =

American musician

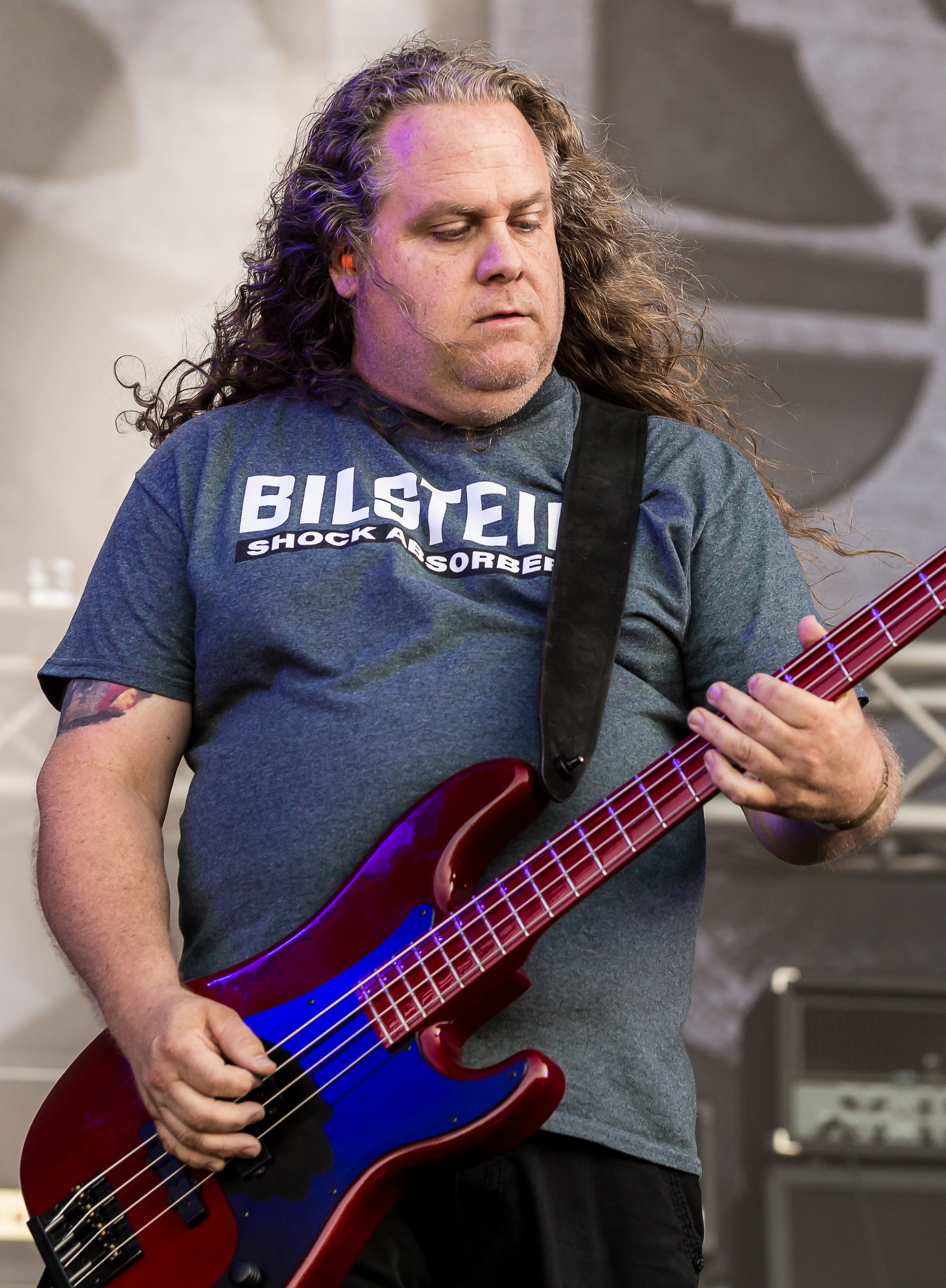
VieBrooks with Exhorder at Party.San Metal Open Air 2022

Jason VieBrooks (born August 9, 1971) is an American bassist and guitarist. He has toured the world with many heavy metal groups, and is an endorsee of Esh Bass.

== Biography ==
Born on August 9, 1971, in Cincinnati, Ohio, VieBrooks graduated from Hamilton High School in 1989. He started playing bass in 1987 and wanted to pursue a career in music, so after graduating high school he moved to San Francisco Bay Area and met Craig Locicero from the band Forbidden. Through Locicero he was introduced to Lee Altus of Heathen and was invited down to audition. That went well and he spent the next few years in Heathen until the band went on hiatus, and Lee joined Die Krupps from Germany. After Heathen, VieBrooks went on to be the original bassist for Grip Inc., the band formed by Slayer's Dave Lombardo and Voodoocult guitarist Waldemar Sorychta. While in Grip Inc., VieBrooks played on the first two albums, Power of Inner Strength and Nemesis. That lineup also did three tours, one of the US with Morbid Angel, one supporting Motörhead in Europe and another co-headlining with German band Kreator. After two CDs and three tours, it was time for VieBrooks to move on, due to personalities conflicting among members.

Once he left Grip Inc. VieBrooks took a break from the music business full-time and started a landscape/ home remodeling business and focused on that. Burnt from the business side of music he felt jaded and needed to step back a while. He formed a band called The Allknowing, based in Cincinnati; they did regional shows and released one album. After The Allknowing project, VieBrooks was ready to dive back into the game, so he hooked up with longtime friends Steve Tucker (Morbid Angel vocalist/bassist) and Steve Jacobs (x-Forbidden, Manmade God drummer). Together, they formed a band called LOWA and recorded a demo, but before anything could happen, Tucker left to join the Nader Sadek project. With that happening, VieBrooks started to play bass in Cincinnati-based band Lorenzo and did countless shows with them. He also played on Lorenzo's latest CD.

While in Lorenzo, VieBrooks got the call to start getting ready to tour with Heathen, a band who he had last been with in 1992. They had since reformed and recorded The Evolution of Chaos with Jon Torres on bass, but he was no longer able to tour so Heathen wanted VieBrooks back. He quickly had the set down and they were on their way to Europe to do the Killfest 2011 tour supporting Overkill. After that tour, Heathen did more touring of Europe and the US with bands like Exodus, Destruction, Sepultura, and others. Between tours, VieBrooks also played bass for NOLA thrash legends Exhorder. In 2016, he joined the Cincinnati-based band War Curse and did several shows and a small East Coast tour run.

In 2017, VieBrooks launched Year of the Tyrant. The lineup features Dan Nelson (formerly of Anthrax), Vinnie LaBella (Exhorder) and Sasha Horn (former Forbidden drummer). The following year, he returned to Exhorder on bass once again.

== Design work ==
In 2010, VieBrooks designed a bass guitar with Esh Bass as a tribute to the late goth metal legend Peter Steele of the band Type O Negative. There were 13 instruments produced in this limited edition, and each was authenticated and signed by VieBrooks and the CEO of Esh.

This bass is my Tribute to Peter Steele. I have been working with Ralf Scholl, owner of Esh basses with A&R when he asked me to re-sign Peter to Esh. In the mid 1990s, Peter and I were the only US sponsored Esh artists. I contacted Peter and told him that Ralf wanted to do a "Signature" model for him and we had been working together for several weeks to get the details perfect. Peter was very excited and proud that Esh wanted to bestow this honour on him. Unfortunately, the world suddenly lost Peter. I had just finalized the last of the details with Peter two days before we heard the news. So now Ralf of Esh basses and myself present the "Jason VieBrooks' tribute to Peter Steele" bass.

== Discography ==
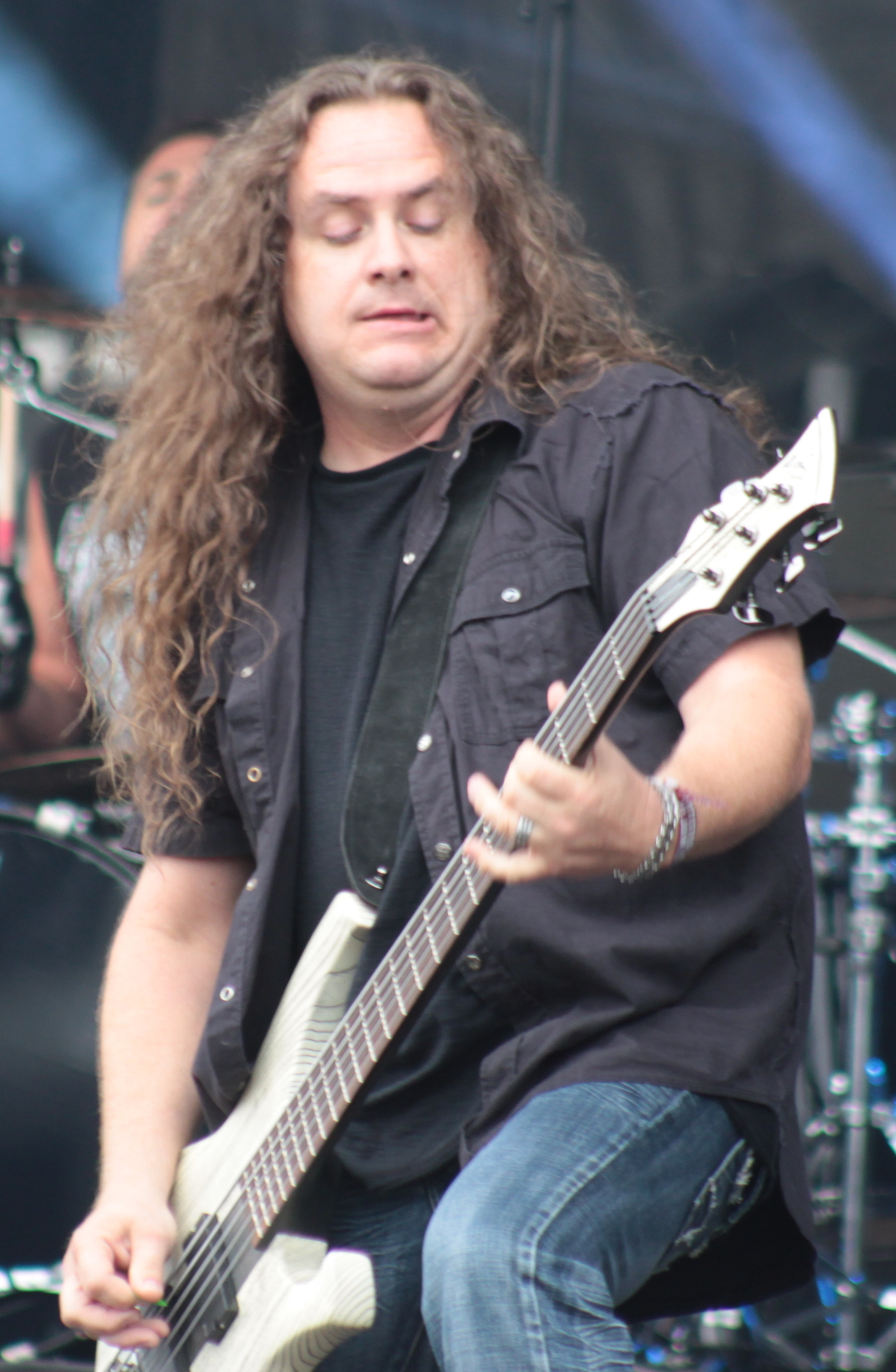
VieBrooks with Heathen at Hellfest 2013

with Grip Inc.

- 1995: Power of Inner Strength
- 1997: Nemesis

with Heathen

- 2004: Uncovered

with The Allknowing

- 2006: Ours for the Taking

with Lorenzo

- 2012: Ignition

with War Curse

- 2019: Eradication

with Exhorder

- 2019: Mourn the Southern Skies
- 2024: Defectum Omnium
