= The Other Side (Alastis album) =

Studio album by Alastis
- Released: 1997
- Recorded: December 1996
- Studio: Woodhouse Studios, Hagen, Germany
- Genre: Gothic black metal
- Length: 39:21
- Label: Century Media
- Producer: Waldemar Sorychta

Alastis chronology
...And Death Smiled (1995)	The Other Side (1997)	Revenge (1998)

Professional ratings
Review scores
Source	Rating
Allmusic	link

The Other Side is a studio release by black metal band Alastis. It was released in 1997 on Century Media.

== Track listing ==
- All lyrics by War B. All music by Alastis.
1. "In Darkness" 3:47
2. "Never Again" 4:55
3. "The Other Side" 4:16
4. "Out of Time" 2:48
5. "Through the Chaos" 3:32
6. "Fight & Win" 2:30
7. "Slaves of Rot" 4:38
8. "Remind" 3:41
9. "Under the Sign" 4:52
10. "End or Beginning?" 4:02

== Personnel ==
- War B.: Vocals, Rhythm Guitar, Guitar Synthesizer
- Nick: Lead Guitar
- Waldemar Sorychta: Keyboards, Synthesizers
- Didier Rotten: Bass, Backing Vocals
- Laurent "Acronoïse" Mermod: Drums, Percussion

== Production ==
- Arranged by Alastis
- Produced by Waldemar Sorychta
- Recorded and mixed by Waldemar Sorychta and Siggi Bemm at Woodhouse Studios
- All songs published by Magic Arts Publishing.
