= Drums of Death =

Drums of Death may refer to:

- Drums of Death (musician), real name Colin Bailey, British electronic musician
- Drums of Death (album), by DJ Spooky and Dave Lombardo, 2005
- "Drums of Death", a song by FKA Twigs from Eusexua, 2025
- "Guns Blazing (Drums of Death, Pt. 1)" and "The Knock (Drums of Death, Pt. 2)", songs by Unkle from Psyence Fiction, 1998
