= Alla Fedynitch =

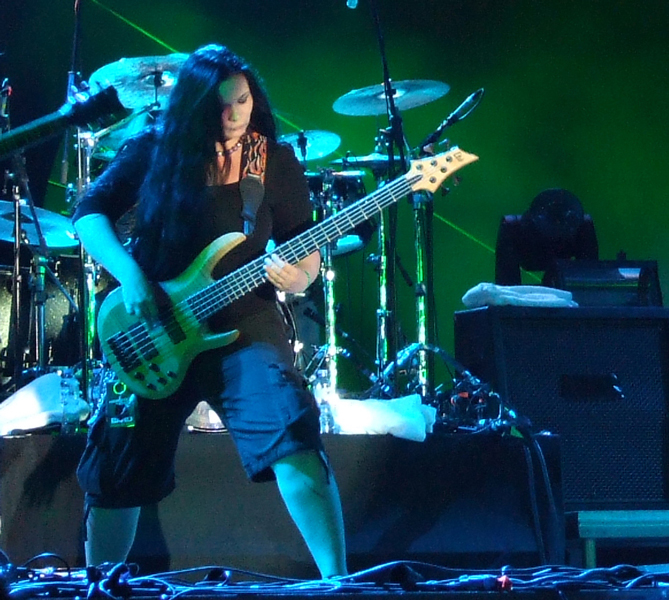
- Alla with Atrocity at Kavarna Rock Fest 2010

Background information
- Born: 18 June 1979 (age 46)
- Genres: Heavy metal, industrial metal, gothic metal, symphonic metal, progressive metal, viking metal, thrash metal
- Occupation: Musician
- Instrument: Bass
- Labels: Napalm, The End, Century Media, Metal Blade

Alla Fedynitch (born 18 June 1979) is a German bassist. She currently plays in Eyes of Eden and Neon Sunrise. She was a member of Leaves' Eyes, touring member of Disillusion and also played previously live with Pain.

== Discography ==
- Neon Sunrise – Toxigenesis (2004)
- Eyes of Eden – Faith (2007)
- Enemy of the Sun – Shadows (2007)
- Atrocity – Werk 80 II (2008)
- Leaves' Eyes – Njord (2009)
