= The Law (Exhorder album) =

Studio album by Exhorder
- Released: March 15, 1992
- Recorded: 1991
- Genre: Thrash metal; groove metal
- Length: 38:43
- Label: Roadrunner
- Producer: Rob Beaton, Exhorder

Exhorder chronology
Slaughter in the Vatican (1990)	The Law (1992)	Mourn the Southern Skies (2019)

The Law is the second studio album by American heavy metal band Exhorder, released on March 15, 1992 through Roadrunner Records. Compared to previous release Slaughter in the Vatican, the band's sound became much more groove metal-oriented while still retaining much of its thrash roots. It was reissued by Roadrunner in 2003 in a two-disc set with Slaughter in the Vatican and again in 2008. The song "Into the Void" is a cover of a Black Sabbath song off their Master of Reality album.

== Critical reception ==
Professional ratings
Review scores
Source	Rating
Allmusic	4/5 stars
Rock Hard	9/10

In 2005, The Law was ranked number 273 in Rock Hard magazine's book The 500 Greatest Rock & Metal Albums of All Time.

== Track listing ==
No.	Title	Length
1.	"Soul Search Me"	4:50
2.	"Unforgiven"	3:53
3.	"I Am the Cross"	4:33
4.	"Un-Born Again"	2:49
5.	"Into the Void" (Geezer Butler, Tony Iommi, Ozzy Osbourne, Bill Ward) (Black Sabbath cover)	6:07
6.	"The Truth"	3:26
7.	"The Law"	4:49
8.	"Incontinence" (instrumental)	3:45
9.	"(Cadence of) the Dirge"	4:31
Total length:		38:43

== Personnel ==
- Kyle Thomas – vocals
- Vinnie LaBella – lead guitar
- Jay Ceravolo – rhythm guitar
- Franky Sparcello – bass
- Chris Nail – drums

=== Additional personnel ===
- Rob Beaton – production, engineering, mixing
- Jay Ceravolo – assistant engineering, mixing
- Ty Bouvier – design
- Kurt Coste – photography
- Ed Lancaster – artwork
- Patricia Mooney – art direction
- Eddy Schreyer – mastering
- Trina Shoemaker – assistant engineering
