= Gerry Nestler =

- Birth name: Gerry Paul Nestler
- Born: Los Angeles, California
- Genres: Progressive metal, heavy metal, thrash metal, experimental rock
- Occupation: Musician
- Instrument(s): Guitar, piano, vocals
- Years active: 1989–present
- Website: Gerry Nestler website

Gerry Paul Nestler is an American vocalist/multi-instrumentalist/songwriter best known for his work with L.A. avantgarde progressive metal band Civil Defiance and experimental post-hardcore triumvirate Philm, featuring former Slayer drummer Dave Lombardo and bassist Francisco 'Pancho' Tomaselli of War. Nestler has also recorded with the bands Kkleq Muzzil, Super Rider and Look Past The Stars as well as guested with DJ Spooky.

== Biography ==
Nestler was born in Los Angeles, California where he grew up in the Mount Washington area, the son of award-winning artist/painter/photographer Frank Nestler. He began playing the piano at age 6 and picked up the guitar at age 14. Inspired by the burgeoning speed and thrash metal scene of the mid to late 1980s, Nestler formed the band Civil Defiance in 1989 which quickly recorded a three-song demo to procure gigs around town. The band frequently played venues such as the Troubadour, Raji's, Mancini's and the Coconut Teaszer, where they took part in several ASCAP-sponsored 'Best Kept Secrets' industry showcases. In 1991, the group issued a self-produced 4-song demo EP, Abstract Reaction, which showcased the band's varied influences and avantgardist approach, fusing classic thrash with everything from world music to grindcore.

In 1993, Nestler and the band began recording their debut album with producer Alex Woltman at the helm. Titled The Fishers For Souls, it was issued on the band's own Blood Orange label in 1996 and licensed to German-based company Dream Circle for a European release in 1997. Noted violinist Lili Haydn makes an appearance on the song "Man in the Moon." A second full-length album, Circus of Fear, containing songs from different recording sessions and including the out-of-print Abstract Reaction EP, was released in 1999 via GSM/Nuclear Blast in Europe only.

Following the band's European tour with Psychotic Waltz in the summer of 1997, Civil Defiance went on hiatus with Nestler and bassist Juan Antonio Perez joining forces with former Slayer drummer Dave Lombardo in a new project. Initially called Letter Bomb and then Philm, the trio eventually settled on the name Kkleq Muzzil, and went about writing material for their debut album at Lombardo's Victorville, CA home studio. Nestler and Perez were dealt a setback when Lombardo got the call to re-join Slayer in 2001. In his place, they recruited local drummer George Hernandez and recorded an album, mixed by noted bassist/producer John Avila of Oingo Boingo fame, for L.A.-based indie label Criterion Records. Released in 2002, M contained three songs co-written with Lombardo in addition to newer material.

Disbanding Kkleq Muzzil shortly thereafter, Nestler formed punk rock influenced power trio Super Rider with bassist Eddie Solis and original Civil Defiance drummer Gabe Trevizo. The band played shows in the L.A. area and issued a sole album, Everything So Right, again mixed by John Avila, in 2003.

Nestler would re-team with Lombardo on DJ Spooky's 2005 album Drums of Death, sharing guitar duties alongside Living Colour's Vernon Reid and playing on the songs "Tool Element", "Kultur Krieg", and "Terra Nullius (Cyborg Rebellion on Colony Planet Zyklon 15)." That same year, Nestler, Trevizo and former Civil Defiance bassist Brian Terry would also issue a 5-song EP, The Seasons Best, via bandspace.com under the name Look Past The Stars. The trio also completed tracking a full-length album which remains unreleased.

After a jam at the famed Rainbow Bar and Grill in West Hollywood, CA, Nestler and Lombardo decided to resurrect Philm in early 2010, adding bassist Pancho Tomaselli from the band War to complete the line-up.

"I think that when Dave and me first started playing, that the inspiration just came from our love of different types of music–you know, just our different loves of music. And it’s a pretty broad gamut of stuff, including some electronica and also free-form and twentieth century; I guess what they love to term the genre is "avant-garde."

– Gerry Nestler, 2010; on the inspiration behind Philm

With Tomaselli on board, the band recorded a 3-song demo with UK producer Piers Baron; The first release came in August 2010 in the form of a 7" single, a cover of the Black Sabbath classic Symptom of the Universe. It was issued by Volcom Entertainment as part of the Volcom Vinyl Club in translucent blue vinyl, limited to 500 copies. The song would also find itself into the band's live set.

On October 29, 2010, Nestler and Lombardo both took part in the "Dimebash" all-star benefit at the Key Club in West Hollywood, CA performing a cover of Black Sabbath's Planet Caravan with Dave Grohl of Foo Fighters, Mike Inez of Alice in Chains, and Zach Myers of Shinedown. In November and December, Philm performed a half dozen shows with Halford on the latter band's Made of Metal U.S. tour.

Philm would eventually sign a record deal with Mike Patton's Ipecac label for the release of their 2012 debut album, Harmonic. It was accompanied by a promotional video for the song "Held In Light" and included updated versions of the songs "Amoniac", "Dome" and "Meditation", written by the original Philm line-up and first recorded and released by Nestler with Kkleq Muzzil on the M album.

On October 19, 2013, Nestler, Lombardo and stand-in bass player Dan Lutz performed the world live premier of composer Christopher Young's Suite from Ghost Rider with the Golden State Pops Orchestra at the Warner Grand Theatre in Los Angeles, CA as part of an evening of horror movie scores performed with a 75-piece orchestra.

Nestler and Philm performed at the 42nd-anniversary party of the Rainbow Bar and Grill in West Hollywood, CA on April 13, 2014. In late July, the band announced the release of their second album, Fire From the Evening Sun, and a new partnership with German-based label UDR Music. A European tour was set to commence on September 7 at The Underworld in London, England.

In September 2016, Nestler released a statement announcing the addition of drummer Anderson Quintero to the Philm ranks, countering a claim by former drummer, Dave Lombardo, that "I did not exit Philm – I ended Philm." The new line-up made its live debut September 20 with an appearance at the Ultimate Jam Night held at the Whisky a Go Go. In early November 2016, Philm debuted a new song and lyric video for "The Seventh Sun" and announced plans for an EP in 2017. The EP release was subsequently canceled.

On July 20, 2018, Nestler announced the September 12 release of his debut solo album, Mama's Child, under his full name, Gerry Paul Nestler. Guest players on the album include Nestler's Philm bandmate, bassist Pancho Tomaselli, drummer Max MacVeety, and saxophonist Evan Francis.

On October 18, 2019, it was officially announced that Civil Defiance had reunited comprising Nestler, bassist Jenk Kent, and new member Christopher Garcia of The Grandmothers on drums, and that the group had recorded five songs for a forthcoming new album. "Eye of the Dog" was released on October 28 as a digital single.

In late October 2020, Nestler and Philm announced a new record deal with Germany's Metalville Records for the release of Time Burner, their first album without Dave Lombardo. The album was released February 19, 2021.

== Discography ==
- Philm – Time Burner (2021)
- Civil Defiance – Eye of the Dog [digital single] (2019)
- Gerry Paul Nestler – Mama's Child (2018)
- Philm – Fire From the Evening Sun (2014)
- Philm – Harmonic (2012)
- Philm – Symptom of the Universe 7" single (2010)
- Look Past The Stars – The Seasons Best EP (2005)
- DJ Spooky – Drums of Death (2005)
- Super Rider – Everything So Right (2003)
- Kkleq Muzzil – M (2002)
- Civil Defiance – Circus of Fear (1999)
- Civil Defiance – The Fishers For Souls (1996)
- Civil Defiance – Abstract Reaction EP (1991)
