= Slaughter in the Vatican =

Studio album by Exhorder
- Released: 1990
- Recorded: December 1989 – August 1990
- Studio: Morrisound, Tampa, Florida
- Genre: Thrash metal
- Length: 41:27
- Label: R/C
- Producer: Scott Burns, Exhorder

Exhorder chronology
Get Rude (1986)	Slaughter in the Vatican (1990)	The Law (1992)

Professional ratings
Review scores
Source	Rating
AllMusic	3/5 stars
Rock Hard	9/10

Slaughter in the Vatican is the debut studio album by American heavy metal band Exhorder, released in 1990 by R/C Records. It was reissued by Roadrunner in 2003 in a double-disc package with the band's follow-up album The Law and reissued again in 2008.

The album saw the band compared with Pantera, with AllMusic commenting on its "death metal-style double kick drums, chugging guitar riffs played at both slow and blistering tempos, and, to top it all off, the gruff but very expressive lead vocals of frontman Kyle Thomas". On May 25, 2018, Slaughter in the Vatican was inducted into the Decibel Hall of Fame.

== Track listing ==
No.	Title	Writer(s)	Length
1.	"Death in Vain"	Kyle Thomas, Vinnie LaBella, Chris Nail	5:30
2.	"Homicide"	LaBella, Nail, Jay Ceravolo	3:12
3.	"Desecrator"	Thomas, Ceravolo, LaBella, Nail	6:08
4.	"Exhorder"	Thomas, Ceravolo, LaBella, Nail	5:10
5.	"The Tragic Period"	Thomas, Ceravolo, LaBella, Nail	7:05
6.	"Legions of Death"	Thomas, Ceravolo, LaBella, Nail	4:30
7.	"Anal Lust"	LaBella, Nail	2:34
8.	"Slaughter in the Vatican"	Thomas, LaBella, Nail	7:19
Total length:			41:27

== Personnel ==
- Kyle Thomas – vocals
- Vinnie LaBella – lead guitar, bass
- Jay Ceravolo – rhythm guitar, bass
- Chris Nail – drums

Production

- Arranged by Exhorder
- Produced by Exhorder and Scott Burns
- Recorded and mixed by Scott Burns at Morrisound Recording (Tampa, Florida)
- Mastered by Mike Fuller at Fullersound (Miami, Florida)
- All songs published by Roadrunner Music Publishing
- Photography by Kurt Coste; artwork and illustrations by Kent Mathieu
