= All Little Devils =

- The cover was designed by Thomas Ewerhard and its text was designed by Vibeke Tveiten.

Studio album by Dismal Euphony
- Released: 22 March 1999
- Recorded: The Woodhouse Studios in September 1998
- Genre: Symphonic black metal, heavy metal
- Length: 39:00
- Language: English
- Label: Nuclear Blast Records
- Producer: Waldemar Sorychta

Professional ratings
Review scores
| Source | Rating |
|---|---|
| AllMusic | 3/5 stars |

All Little Devils is the third studio album by the Norwegian gothic metal band Dismal Euphony. It was released in 1999, and was the band's first album with Nuclear Blast.

== Track listing ==
1. "Days of Sodom" (5:22)
2. "Rage of Fire" (3:44)
3. "Victory" (4:31)
4. "All Little Devils" (4:12)
5. "Lunatic" (4:19)
6. "Psycho Path" (4:03)
7. "Shine for Me, Misery" (6:20)
8. "Scenario" (4:12)
9. "Dead Words" (2:17)

== Production ==
- Recorded and mixed at Woodhouse Studios
- Produced by Waldemar Sorychta
- Engineered by Siggi Bemm & Waldemar Sorychta
- Mastered by Siggi Bemm
- Logo by Vibeke Tveiten
- Cover and layout by Thomas Ewerhard
