= Exhorder =

American thrash/groove metal band

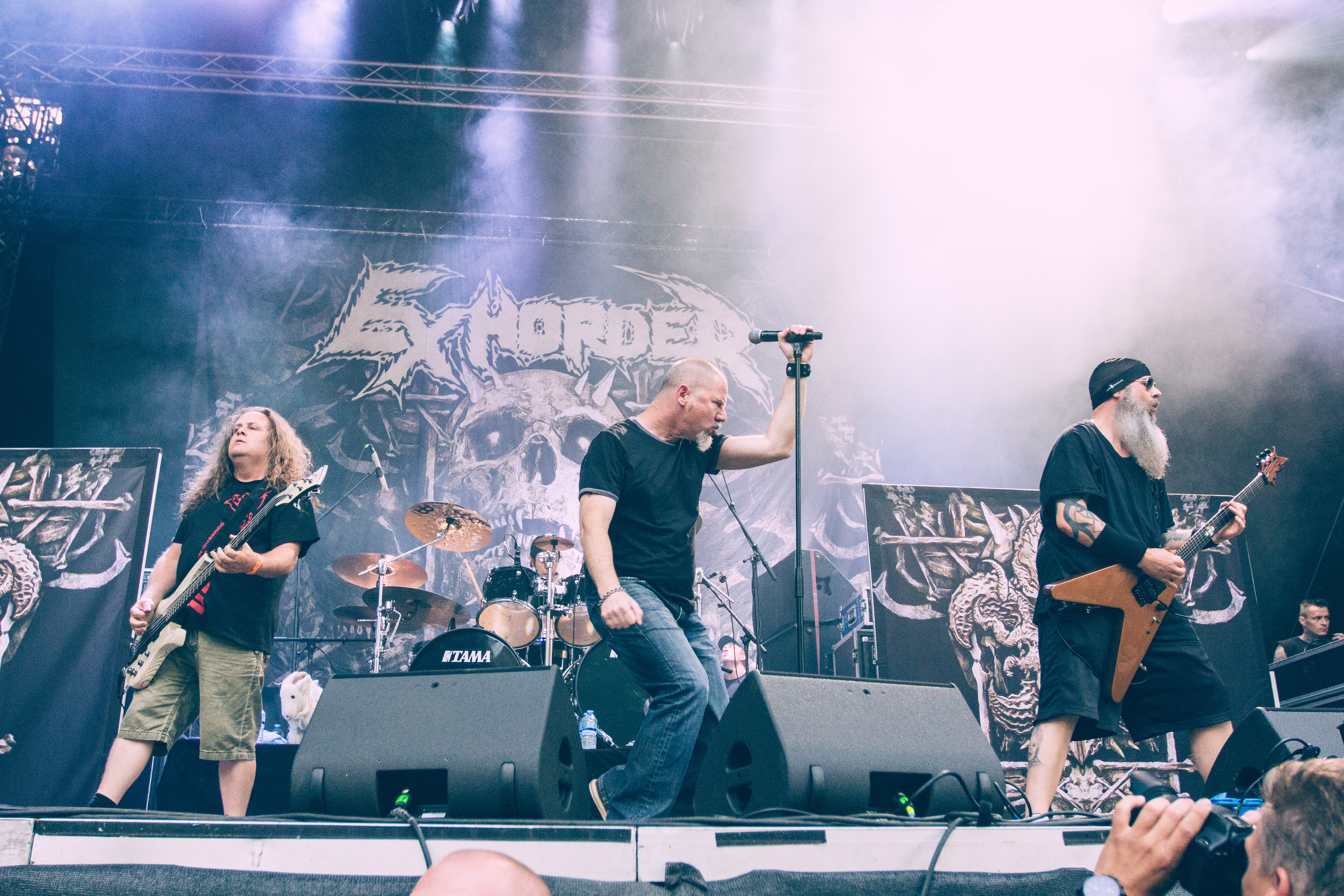
- Exhorder performing at Turok Open Air in Germany, 2018. L–R: Jason VieBrooks, Kyle Thomas, Vinnie LaBella

Background information
- Origin: New Orleans, Louisiana, U.S.
- Genres: Thrash metal; groove metal
- Years active: 1986–1994; 2008–2011; 2017–present
- Labels: Roadrunner; Nuclear Blast
- Members: Kyle Thomas; Jason VieBrooks; Pat O'Brien
- Past members: Vinnie LaBella; David Main; Andy Villafarra; Chris Nail; Jay Ceravolo; Frankie Sparcello; Seth Davis; Marzi Montazeri; Sasha Horn
- Website: www.exhorder.com

Exhorder is an American heavy metal band from New Orleans, Louisiana. The band currently consists of vocalist and rhythm guitarist Kyle Thomas, bassist Jason VieBrooks, lead guitarist Pat O'Brien and touring drummer Corey Pierce.

Considered a progenitor of the groove-oriented thrash popularized by bands such as Pantera and Machine Head, their music is viewed as an influence on the New Orleans metal scene.

Active from 1985 to 1994 and 2008 to 2011, Exhorder reformed in 2017. To date, the band has released four studio albums: Slaughter in the Vatican (1990), The Law (1992), Mourn the Southern Skies (2019) and Defectum Omnium (2024).

== History ==
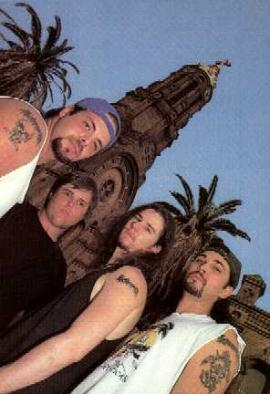
From left to right: Vinnie Labella, Chris Nail, Kyle Thomas, Jay Ceravolo

=== Early years and split (1986–1994) ===
Exhorder was formed in January 1986 in New Orleans, Louisiana. After releasing several demos in the vein of pure thrash metal, they continued this sound with their debut studio album, Slaughter in the Vatican, released in 1990. They adapted more of a groove metal-oriented sound by their second album, The Law, released in 1992. The band broke up in 1994.

=== First reunion and hiatus (2008–2011) ===
On May 9, 2008, the band had reunited and had begun writing new material. As of that day, the band's official Myspace page contains the reunited group's lineup as well as the headline "writing new material for the return of Exhorder". They played their first reunion show on November 14, 2009, at Southport Hall in Jefferson, Louisiana, followed by another less than a month later on December 12 at City Club in Houma, Louisiana, and a show with Crowbar at the Hangar in New Orleans on February 12, 2010. The lineup for all of these shows was the same as that of The Law album.

Seth Davis, a drumming virtuoso from Houma, Louisiana, met Kyle Thomas during their time as French Quarter session musicians, and Davis joined the band soon after, touring from early 2010 to late 2011, performing classic songs from the band's two albums. Original Exhorder drummer Chris Nail tutored Davis in the Thrash metal drumming style.

On March 22, 2011, bassist Frankie Sparcello died of unknown causes. In the interim and in order to fulfill three show dates already booked, the band recruited local bass virtuoso Jorge Caicedo to fill in at the last minute. The band also played Maryland Deathfest on May 28. They then took a hiatus.

=== Second reunion and new releases (2017–present) ===
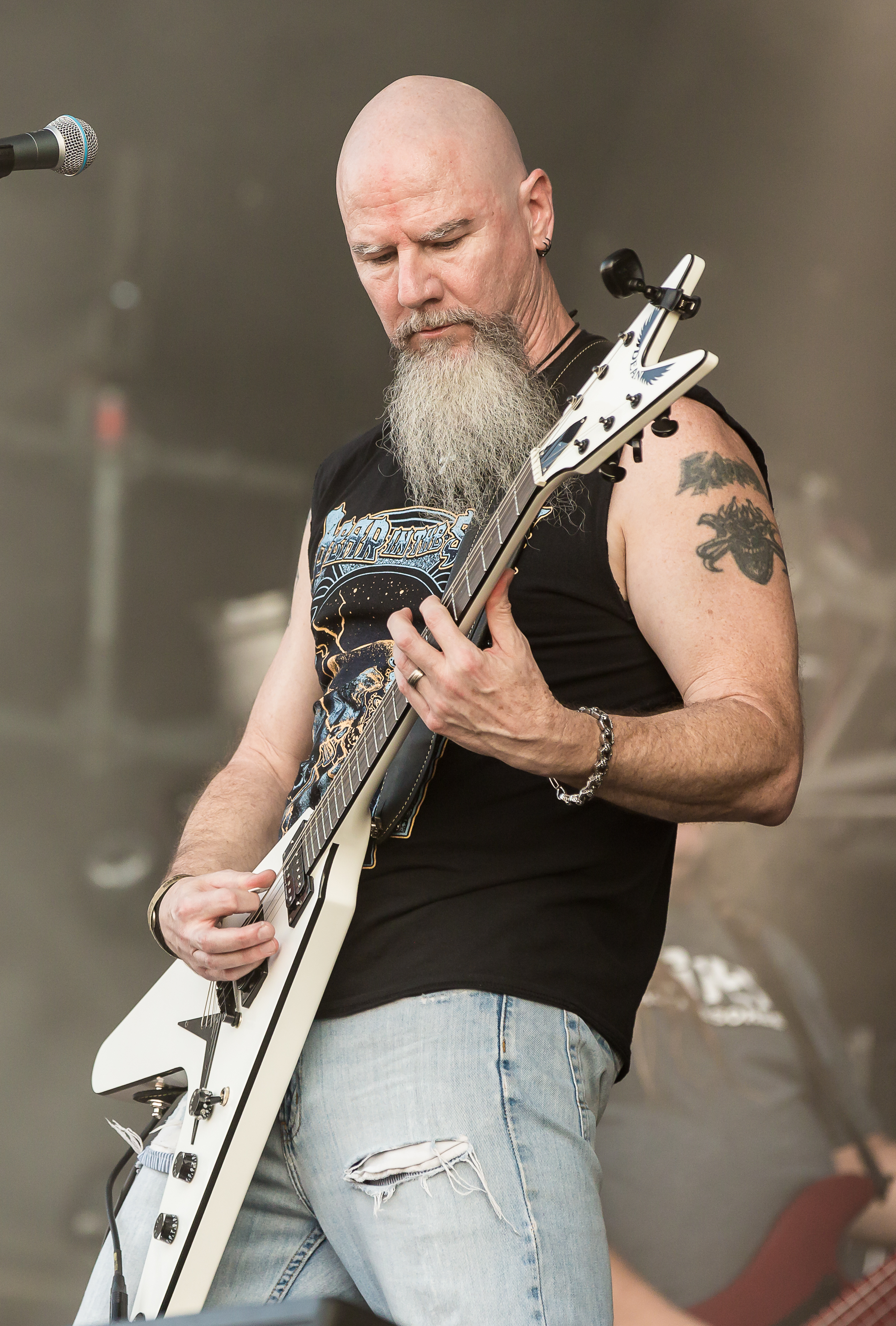
Frontman Kyle Thomas, the band's sole consistent member

In November 2017, Exhorder ended their six-year hiatus with a newly formed line-up and signed a worldwide deal with All Independent Service Alliance. They announced a two-night event in Brooklyn, New York, for February 9 and 10, 2018, by performing the entire Slaughter in the Vatican and The Law albums respectively. The band also performed a homecoming show on February 12 in New Orleans. They were also planning summer festival appearances, and would consider working on new material if the reunion shows went well.

The band signed to Nuclear Blast in November 2018 and started work on a new album.

In May 2019, Exhorder were announced as part of a tour for Kataklysm's "Meditations Over North America" tour in September, along with Krisiun and Hatchet. In July 2019, the band announced their third album, titled Mourn the Southern Skies, which was released on September 20, 2019. The first single, "My Time", was made available for streaming. Exhorder supported the album by supporting Overkill on their Wings of War tour in North America. The band toured with Overkill again during the spring and summer of 2023.

Founding lead guitarist Vinnie LaBella parted ways with the band in February 2020, leaving vocalist Kyle Thomas as the remaining founding member. Instead of replacing LaBella, Exhorder has since continued on as a four-piece, with Thomas handling rhythm guitar duties. On February 14, 2022, guitarist Marzi Montazeri announced that he was quitting the band. He was replaced by Pat O'Brien.

By 2022, Exhorder had been working on new material for their fourth studio album. The resulting album, Defectum Omnium, was released on March 8, 2024.

Thomas announced in November 2025 that Exhorder has been working on new material for their fifth studio album, with a tentative release date of 2027.

On March 18, 2026, it was announced Sasha Horn had left the band to "focus on his personal life", and announced Corey Pierce (of God Forbid) as his replacement for upcoming shows.

== Musical style and comparisons with Pantera ==
Exhorder's style of heavy metal is described by Bradley Torreano of AllMusic as "thrash-and-groove." He explains the band's stylistic signature is "chugging, tightly constructed, syncopated" guitar riffs.

There has been controversy amongst Pantera's and Exhorder's fans over similarities between both bands' sounds, fueled by the success of Pantera and the obscurity of Exhorder. Some have dubbed Exhorder as "Pantera minus the good songs." AllMusic countered this assessment in their review of Slaughter in the Vatican, where the author expressed the belief that "perhaps a more accurate billing would be to call them Pantera without the major label backing." The author also pointed to the fact that the title of Exhorder's debut, along with the unsubtle album cover, "certainly didn't help [its] cause any."

Exhorder lead vocalist Kyle Thomas has expressed indifference towards the criticism, and has grown weary of seeing Exhorder's name tied to Pantera's. He also stated that he and some members of Pantera were friends (particularly the latter's lead singer Phil Anselmo, who was a fan of Exhorder in their early days), and that he mourns the loss of Pantera guitarist Dimebag Darrell. Thomas has suggested that while it is possible Pantera may have been influenced by his band, the members of Pantera "work[ed] a ... lot harder than [they] did."

== Band members ==
Exhorder at Rockharz Open Air 2023

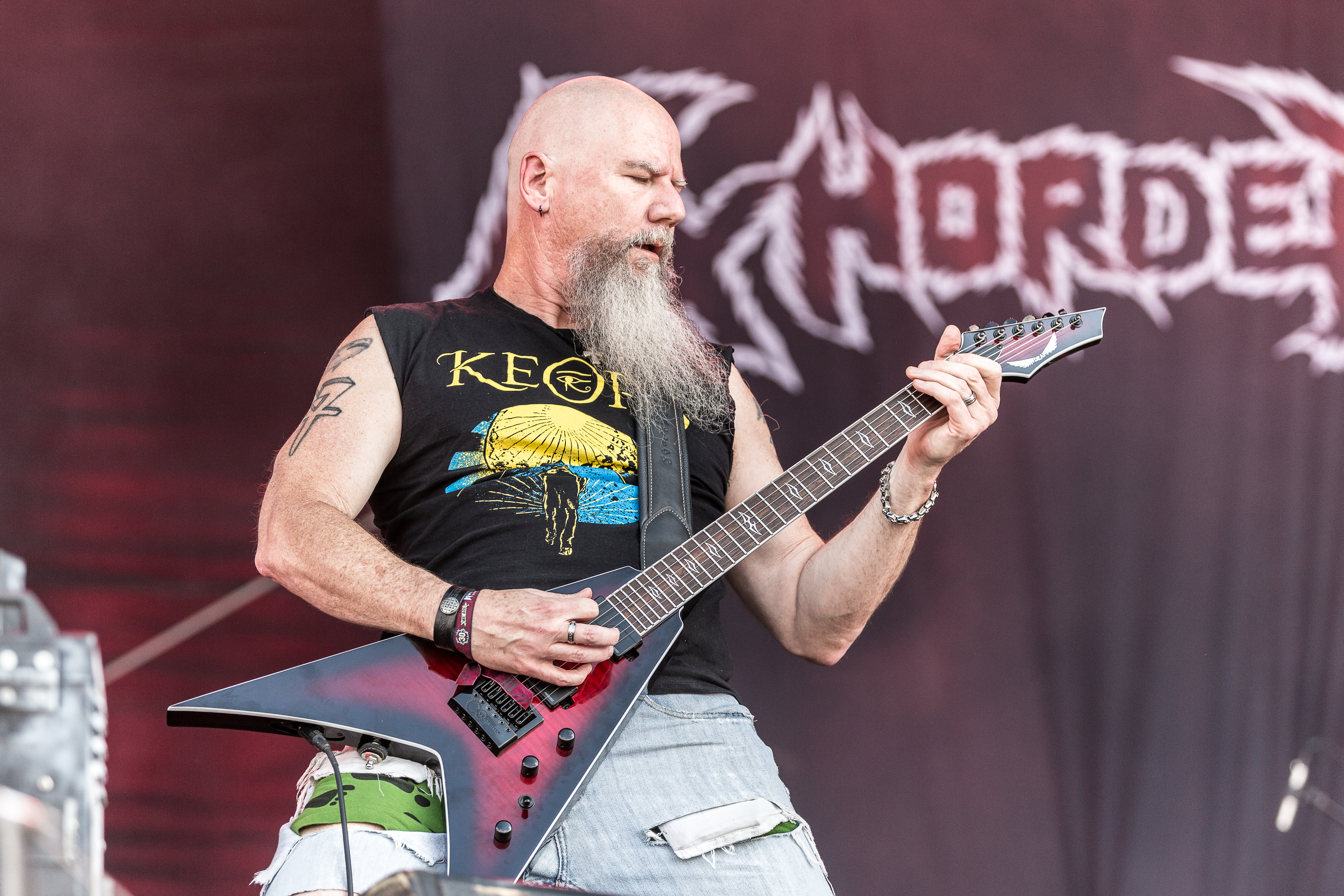
Kyle Thomas

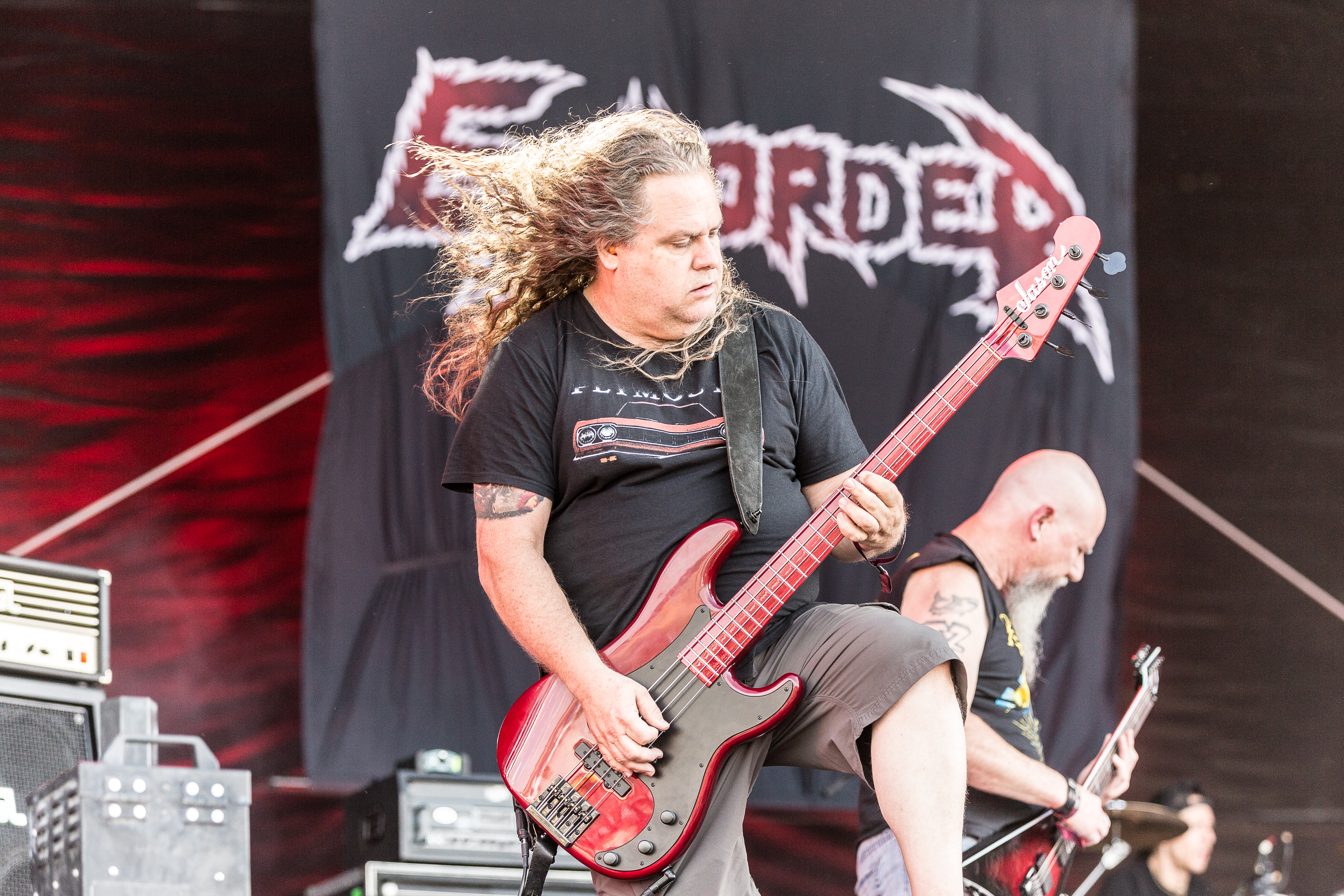
Jason VieBrooks

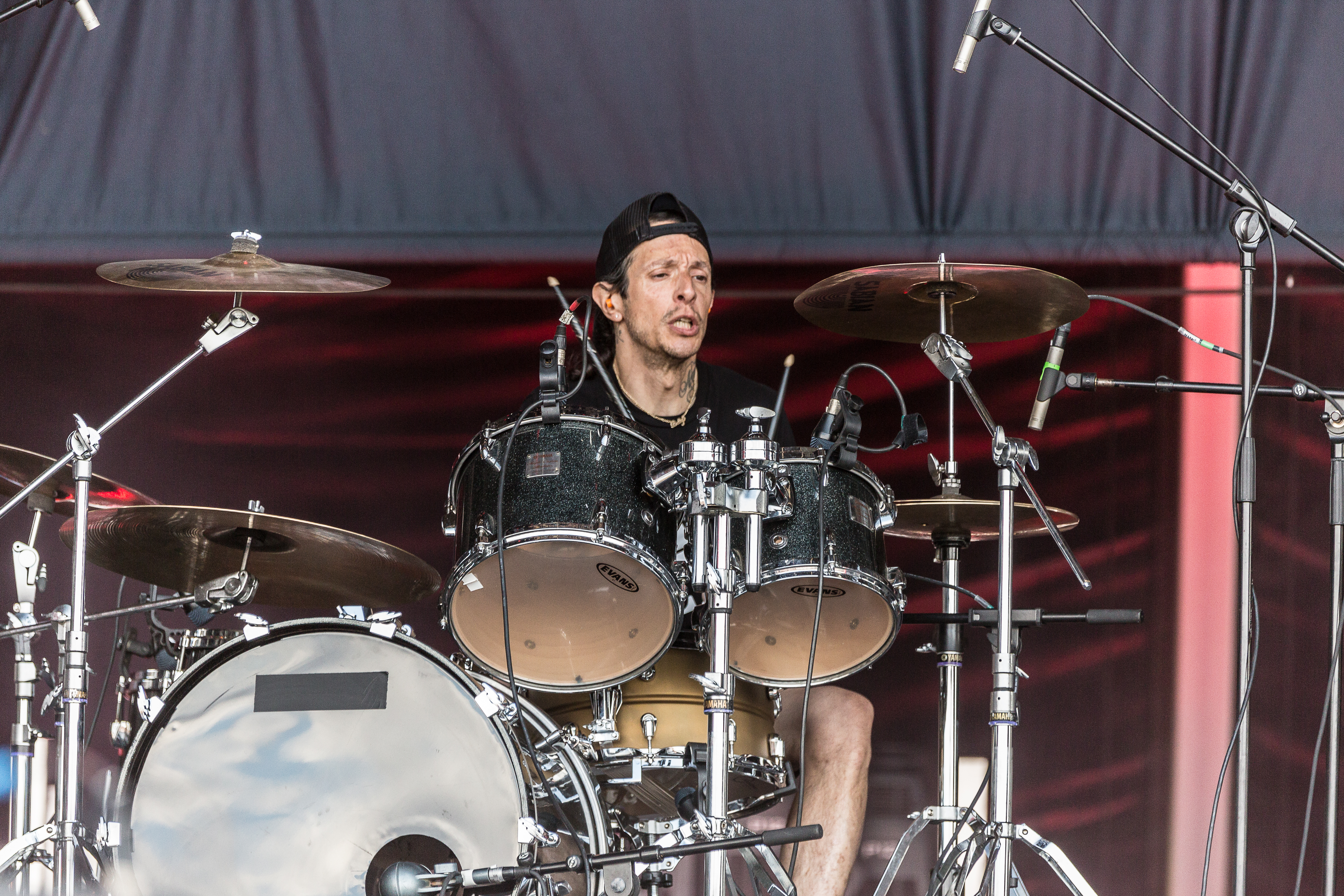
Sasha Horn

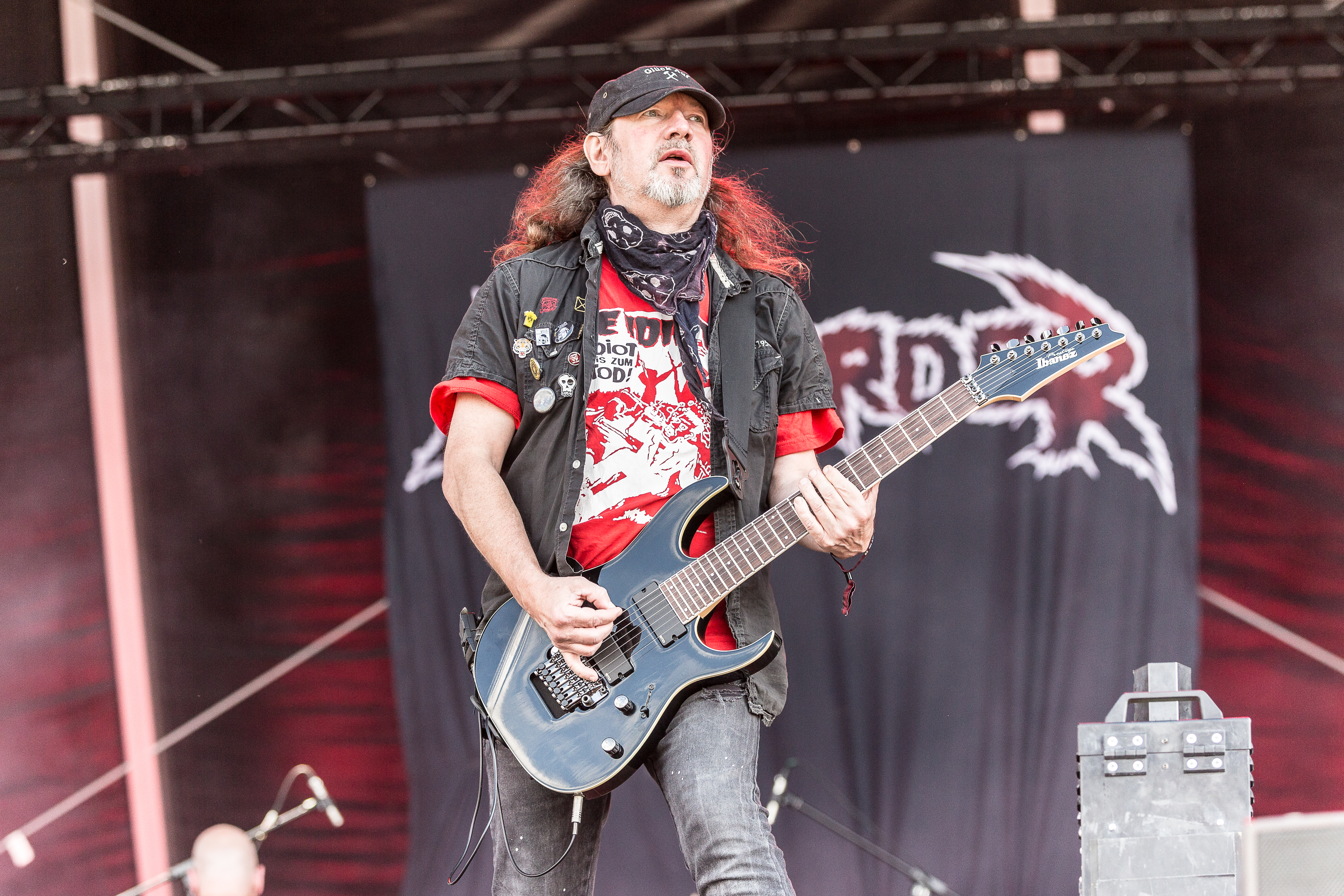
Waldemar Sorychta

Current members

- Kyle Thomas – vocals (1985–1994, 2008–2011, 2017–present), rhythm guitar (2022–present)
- Jason VieBrooks – bass (2017–present)
- Pat O'Brien – lead guitar (2022–present)

Touring members

- Waldemar Sorychta – lead guitar (2022–present; international dates)
- Apollo Xydias - lead guitar (2023–present; international dates)
- Ol Drake – lead guitar (2023)
- Corey Pierce – drums (2026–present)

Former members

- Vinnie LaBella – lead guitar (1985–1994, 2008–2011, 2017–2020), bass (1989–1991)
- Chris Nail – drums (1985–1994, 2008–2010)
- Andy Villafarra – bass (1985–1989, 2008–2010, 2011)
- David Main – rhythm guitar (1985–1987)
- Jay Ceravolo – rhythm guitar (1987–1994, 2008–2011), bass (1989–1991)
- Frankie Sparcello – bass (1991–1994, 2010–2011)
- Seth Davis – drums (2010–2011)
- Marzi Montazeri – rhythm guitar (2017–2022), lead guitar (2020–2022)
- Sasha Horn – drums (2017–2026)

Timeline

== Discography ==
=== Studio albums ===
- Slaughter in the Vatican (1990, Roadrunner Records)
- The Law (1992, Roadrunner Records)
- Mourn the Southern Skies (2019, Nuclear Blast Records)
- Defectum Omnium (2024, Nuclear Blast Records)

=== Live albums ===
- Live Death (1994, Roadrunner Records)

=== Demos ===
- Get Rude (1986, self-released)
- Slaughter in the Vatican (1987, self-released)
