= Waldemar Sorychta =

Polish record producer and musician

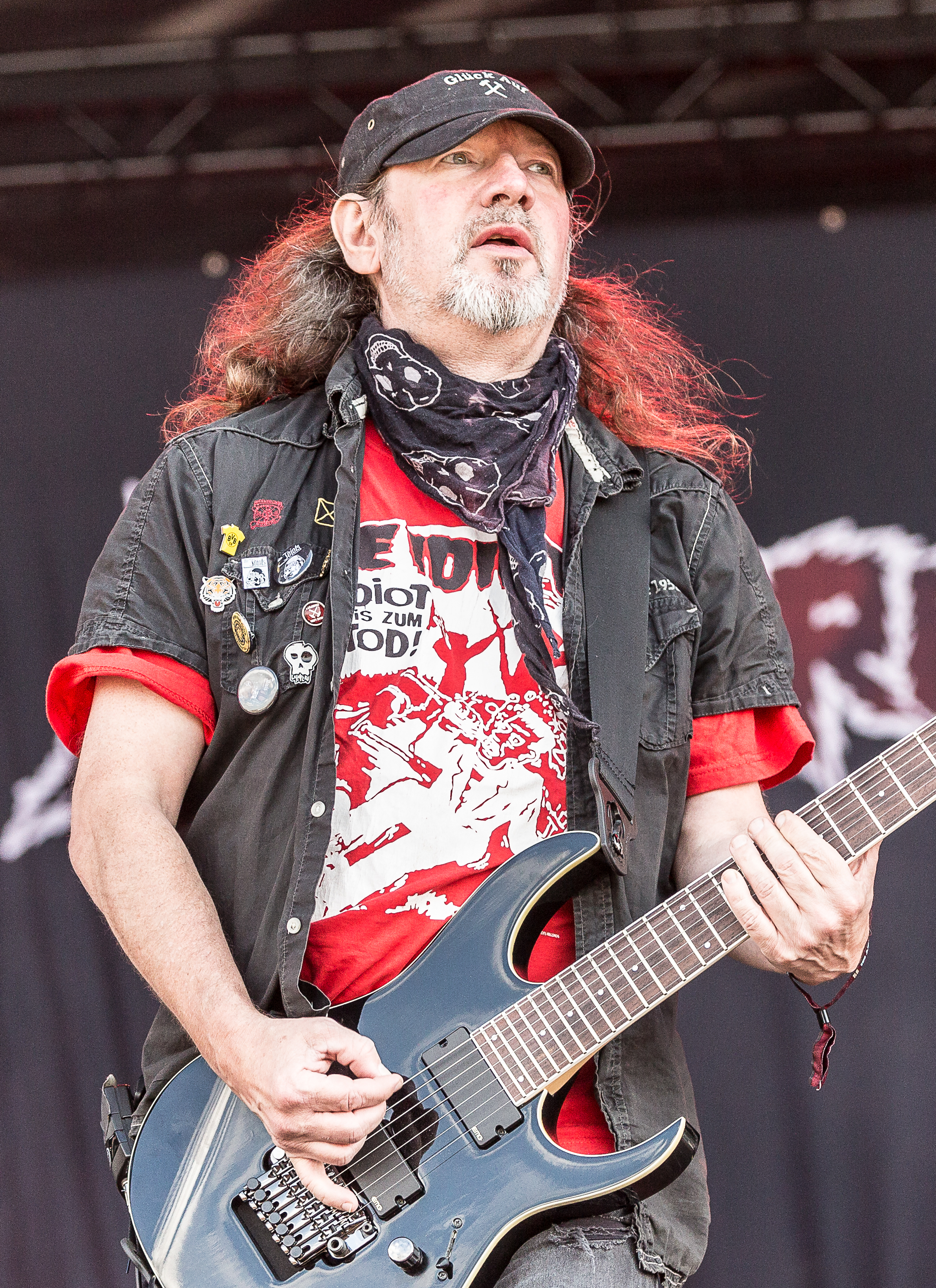
- Sorychta with Exhorder in 2023

Background information
- Born: 30 October 1967 (age 58); Zabrze, Poland
- Genres: Heavy metal
- Occupation(s): Musician, record producer
- Instrument(s): Guitar, keyboards, bass
- Years active: 1986–present
- Member of: Despair, Eyes of Eden, Enemy of the Sun
- Formerly of: Grip Inc., Voodoocult
- Website: waldemar-sorychta.de

Waldemar Sorychta (born 30 October 1967) is a Polish heavy metal record producer and musician who has lived in Germany since 1982.

== Career ==
He initially worked with German thrash metal band Despair, founded in 1986.

In 1994 he took part in the recording of the album Jesus Killing Machine by supergroup Voodoocult, led by German rock singer Phillip Boa featuring former Slayer drummer Dave Lombardo among others. Later on, Sorychta and Lombardo founded the band Grip Inc. He recorded four albums with Grip Inc.: Power of Inner Strength (1995), Nemesis (1997) Solidify (1999) and Incorporated (2004).

Sorychta is also well known as a record producer, working with such bands as Lacuna Coil, Sentenced, Tiamat, Samael, The Gathering, Tristania, Moonspell, and many others. In 1995 he was nominated for a Grammi in Sweden as "Producer of the Year" for his recording of Wildhoney by Tiamat.

In 1999, he recorded the album Sleep of the Angels of the Greek metal band Rotting Christ as a session musician.

Following the activity suspension of Grip Inc. in 2006, he founded the gothic metal band Eyes of Eden. He recorded with this band the album Faith, released on 17 August 2007. Also in 2006, he founded the thrash metal group Enemy of the Sun, which recorded the album Shadows, released on 7 December 2007.

In 2009, he worked with Floor Jansen and Joost van den Broek, former members of the Dutch band After Forever, on their then new project called ReVamp.

He is also a well-known guest player for several bands, e.g. Therion on their tour in 2010.

== Discography ==
=== Despair ===
- History of Hate (1988) – guitar, vocals, producer
- Decay of Humanity (1990) – guitar, producer
- Beyond Reason (1992) – guitar, producer

=== Voodoocult ===
- Jesus Killing Machine (1994) – guitar, producer

=== Grip Inc. ===
- Power of Inner Strength (1995) – guitar, backing vocals, producer
- Nemesis (1997) – guitar, keyboards, producer
- Solidify (1999) – guitar, keyboards, producer
- Incorporated (2004) – guitar, backing vocals, producer

=== Rotting Christ ===
- Sleep of the Angels (1999) – guitar (session)

=== Enemy of the Sun ===
- Shadows (2007) – guitar, producer
- Caedium (2010) – guitar, producer

=== Eyes of Eden ===
- Faith (2007) – guitar, producer

=== As producer ===
- Tiamat – The Astral Sleep (1991) – also guitar
- Unleashed – Where No Life Dwells (1991)
- Samael – Blood Ritual (1992)
- Unleashed – Shadows in the Deep (1992)
- Tiamat – Clouds (1992)
- Samael – Ceremony of Opposites (1994)
- Tiamat – Wildhoney (1994) – also keyboards
- Moonspell – Wolfheart (1995)
- Alastis – ...And Death Smiled (1995)
- Samael – Rebellion (EP) (1995)
- The Gathering – Mandylion (1995)
- Moonspell – Irreligious (1996)
- Samael – Passage (1996)
- Sentenced – Down (1996) – also keyboards
- Alastis – The Other Side (1997) – also keyboards
- Samael – Exodus (1998)
- Moonspell – Sin/Pecado (1998)
- Lacuna Coil – Lacuna Coil (EP) (1998)
- Alastis – Revenge (1998)
- Sentenced – Frozen (1998) – also keyboards
- Therion – Vovin (1998) – also guitar
- Therion – Crowning of Atlantis (1999) – also guitar
- Lacuna Coil – In a Reverie (1999) – also keyboards
- Dismal Euphony – All Little Devils (1999) – also guitar, keyboards
- Therion – Deggial (2000) – also acoustic guitar
- Lacuna Coil – Halflife (2000)
- Flowing Tears – Jade (2000)
- Lacuna Coil – Unleashed Memories (2001)
- Lacuna Coil – Comalies (2002)
- Flowing Tears – Serpentine (2002)
- Flowing Tears – Razorbliss (2005)
- Samael – Reign of Light (2005)
- Lacuna Coil – Karmacode (2006)
- Moonspell – Memorial (2006) also bass guitar
- Tristania – Illumination (2006–2007)
- Samael – Solar Soul (2007)
- Rusty Eye – Possessor (2009) also guest guitar, keyboards and mixing.
- Witchbreed – Heretic Rapture (2009)
- The Very End – Mercy & Misery (2010)
- Sodom – In War and Pieces (2010)
- The Other – New Blood (2010)
- Samael – Lux Mundi (2010)
- Exumer – Fire & Damnation (2012)
- The Very End – Turn Off the World (2012)
- Sodom – Epitome of Torture (2013)
- Charm Designer – Everlasting (2016)
- Samael – Hegemony (2017)
- baṣnia - No Falling Stars And No Wishes (2019)

==== Compilations ====
- Metalmeister Vol. 2 (1997)
- 21st Century Media Blitz Vol. 2 (1999)
- Beauty in Darkness Vol. 3 (1999)
- Metal Dreams (1999)
- Metal Dreams Vol. 3 (2001)
- Metal Blade Records 20th Anniversary (2002)
- Anthems for the Rotten Vol. 1 (2003)
- MTV2 Headbangers Ball (2003)
- Resident Evil: Apocalypse Original Soundtrack (2004)
- Alone in the Dark Original Soundtrack (2005)
