= Incorporated (Grip Inc. album) =

Studio album by Grip Inc.
- Released: March 16, 2004
- Recorded: August–September 2003
- Genre: Groove metal
- Length: 48:10
- Label: SPV
- Producer: Waldemar Sorychta

Grip Inc. chronology
Solidify (1999)	Incorporated (2004)

Professional ratings
Review scores
Source	Rating
AllMusic	link
Scream Magazine	4/6 stars

Incorporated is the fourth and final full-length studio album by American groove metal band Grip Inc. It was released on March 16, 2004.

== Track listing ==
All lyrics are written by Gus Chambers; all music is composed by Waldemar Sorychta.

No.	Title	Length
1.	"Curse (of the Cloth)"	5:04
2.	"The Answer"	3:49
3.	"Prophecy"	4:18
4.	"Endowment of Apathy"	3:06
5.	"Enemy Mind"	3:24
6.	"Skin Trade"	4:25
7.	"(Built to) Resist"	4:27
8.	"The Gift"	4:12
9.	"Privilege"	4:48
10.	"Blood of Saints"	5:03
11.	"Man with No Insides"	5:34

== Personnel ==
- Waldemar Sorychta – guitar, backing vocals, producer, engineer
- Gus Chambers – vocals
- Dave Lombardo – drums
- Stuart Carruthers – bass
- Eicca Toppinen – cello
- Sami Yli-Sirniö – sitar
- Su Maha Ya – violin
- Jeff Collin – vocals
- Dennis Koehne – engineer
- Siggi Bemm – engineer
