= Faith (Eyes of Eden album) =

Studio album by Eyes of Eden
- Released: 20 August 2007 (EU); 6 November 2007 (NA)
- Recorded: 2005–2006
- Genre: Symphonic gothic metal
- Label: Century Media Records
- Producer: Waldemar Sorychta

Professional ratings
Review scores
Source	Rating
AllMusic	3.5/5 stars

Faith is the first studio album by the gothic metal band Eyes of Eden. It was released on 20 August 2007 in Europe and on 6 November 2007 in North America.

== Track list ==
1. "Winter Night" – 3:37
2. "When Gods Fall" – 3:37
3. "Star" – 3:47
4. "Pictures" – 4:10
5. "Dancing Fire" – 3:15
6. "Sleeping Minds" – 4:00
7. "Daylight" – 4:03
8. "Man in the Flame" – 4:22
9. "From Heaven Sent" – 4:17
10. "Not Human Kind" – 10:02
