= Solidify (Grip Inc. album) =

Studio album by Grip Inc.
- Released: February 23, 1999
- Recorded: August 1998
- Studio: Woodhouse Studio (Hagen)
- Genre: Groove metal
- Length: 46:43
- Label: Steamhammer
- Producer: Waldemar Sorychta

Grip Inc. chronology
Nemesis (1997)	Solidify (1999)	Incorporated (2004)

Professional ratings
Review scores
Source	Rating
Allmusic	3/5 stars
Rock Hard	8.5/10 stars

Solidify is the third album by heavy metal band Grip Inc.

== Track listing ==
All lyrics are written by Gus Chambers; all music is composed by Waldemar Sorychta, except where noted.

No.	Title	Length
1.	"Isolation"	3:38
2.	"Amped"	4:20
3.	"Lockdown"	4:03
4.	"Griefless"	6:04
5.	"Foresight"	3:49
6.	"Human?"	4:49
7.	"Vindicate" (Stuart Carruthers)	4:19
8.	"Stresscase"	2:58
9.	"Challenge"	3:14
10.	"Verräter (Betrayer)"	4:12
11.	"Bug Juice" (instrumental, Waldemar Sorychta, Dave Lombardo)	5:16

== Line-up ==
- Dave Lombardo — drums, percussion
- Gus Chambers — vocals
- Stuart Carruthers — bass
- Waldemar Sorychta — guitars, keyboards
