= Nemesis (Grip Inc. album) =

Studio album by Grip Inc.
- Released: February 25, 1997
- Genre: Groove metal
- Length: 37:43
- Label: Steamhammer
- Producer: Waldemar Sorychta

Grip Inc. chronology
| Power of Inner Strength (1995) | Nemesis (1997) | Solidify (1999) |

Professional ratings
Review scores
| Source | Rating |
|---|---|
| AllMusic | 3/5 stars |
| Rock Hard | 9.5/10 stars |

Nemesis is the second album by American groove metal band Grip Inc.

== Track listing ==
| No. | Title | Lyrics | Music | Length |
|---|---|---|---|---|
| 1. | "Pathetic Liar" | Gus Chambers | Waldemar Sorychta | 3:03 |
| 2. | "Portrait of Henry" | Gus Chambers | Dave Lombardo, Waldemar Sorychta | 1:28 |
| 3. | "Empress (Of Rancor)" | Gus Chambers | Waldemar Sorychta, Jason VieBrooks | 3:35 |
| 4. | "Descending Darkness" | Gus Chambers | Waldemar Sorychta | 2:00 |
| 5. | "War Between One" | Gus Chambers | Waldemar Sorychta | 2:16 |
| 6. | "Scream at the Sky" | Gus Chambers | Waldemar Sorychta, Dave Lombardo | 4:46 |
| 7. | "Silent Stranger" | Gus Chambers | Waldemar Sorychta, Dave Lombardo | 2:54 |
| 8. | "The Summoning" | Gus Chambers | Waldemar Sorychta | 4:27 |
| 9. | "Rusty Nail" | Gus Chambers | Waldemar Sorychta | 3:24 |
| 10. | "Myth or Man" | Gus Chambers | Waldemar Sorychta, Dave Lombardo, Jason VieBrooks | 3:44 |
| 11. | "Code of Silence" | Gus Chambers | Waldemar Sorychta | 6:02 |

== Personnel ==
- Waldemar Sorychta – guitars, keyboards
- Gus Chambers – vocals
- Jason VieBrooks – bass
- Dave Lombardo – drums, percussion
