= Drummerworld =

Swiss drumming website, founded 1997

Drummerworld is a Swiss drum website created by Bernhard Castiglioni in 1997. The site focuses on the biographies of prominent rock and jazz drummers, and includes drum lessons and a discussion forum.

The website was recognized as one of the best drumming forum websites from 2006 to 2013 and again in 2015 by Drum! magazine.
