= Eyes of Eden =

German symphonic metal band

- Origin: Dortmund, Germany
- Genres: Symphonic metal Gothic metal
- Years active: 2005–present
- Labels: Century Media
- Members: Waldemar Sorychta; Alla Fedynitch; Tom Diener; Franziska Huth
- Past members: Sandra Schleret; Gas Lipstick
- Website: eyesofeden.de

Eyes of Eden is a German symphonic metal band founded in 2005 by multi-instrumentalist and record producer Waldemar Sorychta.

== History ==
Waldemar Sorychta started Eyes of Eden by writing songs and assembling the band. They recorded the material with Gas Lipstick (HIM) on drums. Singer Sandra Schleret recorded most of the vocals of the album, but then had some serious health issues to take care of, so she left the band before the album was finished. Eyes of Eden then appointed 20-year-old Franziska Huth to re-record the vocals on the album. Faith was released in 2007. The drum parts on the album were initially recorded by Gas Lipstick, but he was later replaced by Tom Diener. Alla Fedynitch was chosen as the bassist. Faith was released on 20 August 2007 in Europe and 6 November 2007 in North America.

== Discography ==
Studio albums

- Faith (2007)

== Band members ==
Current members

- Franziska Huth – vocals
- Waldemar Sorychta – guitar
- Alla Fedynitch – bass
- Tom Diener – drums

Former members

- Sandra Schleret – vocals
- Gas Lipstick – drums
