= Alastis =

Swiss metal band

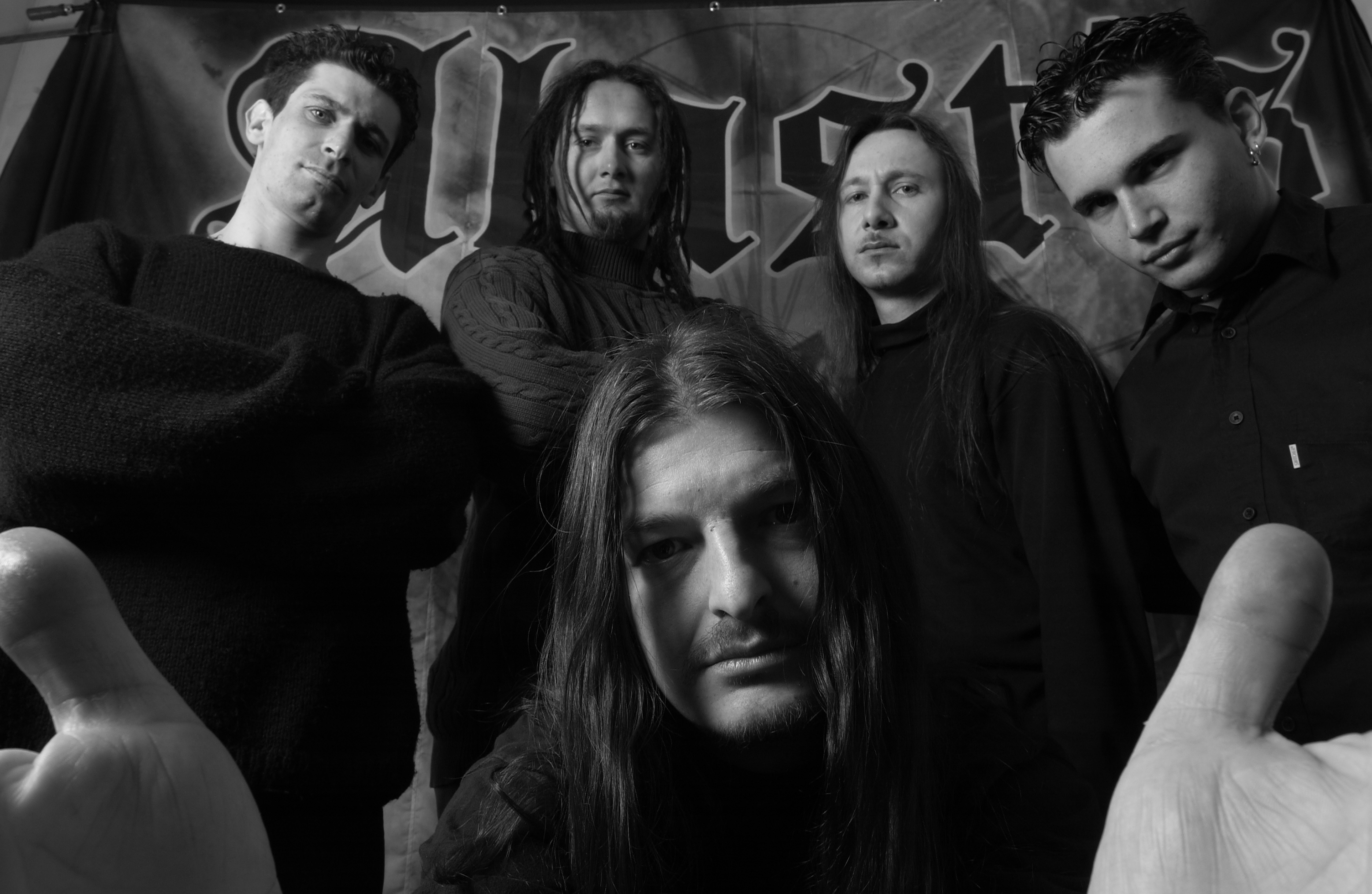
- Alastis in 2002

Background information
- Also known as: Fourth Reich
- Origin: Sion, Valais, Switzerland
- Genres: Black metal Gothic metal
- Years active: 1987–2004 2023-present
- Labels: Head Not Found; Adipocere Records; Century Media Records
- Members: War D. Nick; Raff; Davide
- Past members: Sebastian; Graven X Laurent "Acronoise" Mermod; Zumof; Christophe "Masmiseim" Mermod; Eric Bouillou; Didier Rotten; Kleid
- Website: alastis.ch

Alastis is a Swiss dark metal band that formed in 1987 in Sion, Valais, and disbanded in 2004, having released five albums. In November 2023, the band reformed.

== History ==
The band formed in 1987 as Fourth Reich, playing death metal. The initial line-up was War D. on guitar, Zumof on vocals, Acronoise on drums, and Masmiseim (b. Christophe Mermod, Acronoise's brother) on bass. In 1989, Fourth Reich renamed to Alastis, a derivation of Alastor, the executioner of hell, and switched to black metal. Two years later, Masmiseim left to join Samael. Zumof departed soon after. Samael's current vocalist/guitarist Vorph guested vocals on a track from the demo Black Wedding. The band issued their debut album, The Just Law, on Head Not Found. After more line-up changes, they signed to Adipocere Records, who issued their second album, ...And Death Smiled, in 1995. That year, Alastis toured with Anathema and Theatre of Tragedy to support the album.

Like fellow countrymen Samael, gothic and industrial music played a role in their latter-career sound, starting as raw black metal before signing to Century Media Records in 1996, who distributed the group's output in the United States. The Other Side was released in 1997 and promoted with a show at Wacken Open Air in Germany. The band released their fourth album, Revenge, in 1998. The line-up at this stage was War D. on guitar/synthesizer/vocals, Acronoise on drums, Nick on second guitar, and Raff on bass.

"The Other Side" is considered the band's cornerstone album. The title track and opener "In Darkness" are their best-recognized songs; the latter appeared on the 1997 Nuclear Blast compilation CD Beauty In Darkness, Vol 2, along with work by Dimmu Borgir, Therion, In Flames, Sentenced, My Dying Bride and others.

In 2000, the band added drummer Sebastian and Graven X on keyboards. Their last album was the 10-track Unity, released in 2001 on Century Media Records. After that, they built a home studio, supposedly to record their sixth album, for which several songs had been written. The album was never recorded and the band split up in 2004. While the members played together in other projects, they no longer wrote music as Alastis.

In the Summer of 2010, the band reformed as The Corrosive Candy and recorded their debut album with label ALASTIS Records. Produced by War D., mixed by War D. and Raff, they expected to release the album in early 2011.

== Personnel ==
=== Final line-up ===
- Raphael "War D." Fumeaux – lead vocals (1991–present), rhythm guitar (1987–present), backing vocals (1987–1991)
- Nicolas "Nick" Ducommun – lead guitar, backing vocals (1997–present)
- Raphael "Raff" Salamin – bass, backing vocals (1998–present)
- Davide Savoini – drums, percussions (2023–present)

=== Former members ===
- Sebastian – drums, percussions (2000–2004)
- Graven X – keyboards, effects, backing vocals (2000–2004)
- Laurent "Acronoise" Mermod – drums, percussions (1987–2000)
- Zumof – lead vocals (1987–1991)
- Christophe "Masmiseim" Mermod – bass, backing vocals (1987–1991)
- Eric Bouillou – bass, backing vocals (1991–1992)
- Didier Rotten – bass, backing vocals (1993–1997)
- Kleid – lead guitar (1987–1988)

=== Session musicians ===
- George-Paul Gillioz – keyboards in The Just Law (1992)
- Waldemar Sorychta – keyboards and acoustic guitars in And Death Smiled, The Other Side and Revenge

Timeline

== Discography ==
=== Demos ===
- Fatidical Date (1989)
- Black Wedding (1990)

=== Studio albums ===
- The Just Law (1992)
- ...And Death Smiled (1995)
- The Other Side (1997)
- Revenge (1998)
- Unity (2001)
