= Power of Inner Strength =

Studio album by Grip Inc.
- Released: March 7, 1995
- Recorded: October–November 1994
- Studio: Woodhouse Studios, Hagen, Germany
- Genre: Groove metal
- Length: 41:38
- Label: Steamhammer
- Producer: Waldemar Sorychta and Grip Inc.

Grip Inc. chronology
Power of Inner Strength (1995)	Nemesis (1997)

Professional ratings
Review scores
Source	Rating
AllMusic	2.5/5 stars
Rock Hard	9/10 stars

Power of Inner Strength is the debut album by American groove metal band Grip Inc. It was released on March 7, 1995.

== Track listing ==
No.	Title	Lyrics	Music	Length
1.	"Toque de Muerto"		Dave Lombardo	1:22
2.	"Savage Seas (Retribution)"	Gus Chambers	Dave Lombardo, Waldemar Sorychta	3:11
3.	"Hostage to Heaven"	Gus Chambers	Waldemar Sorychta, Dave Lombardo	3:57
4.	"Monster Among Us"	Gus Chambers	Waldemar Sorychta	4:22
5.	"Guilty of Innocence"	Gus Chambers	Waldemar Sorychta	3:37
6.	"Innate Affliction"	Gus Chambers	Waldemar Sorychta, Dave Lombardo	3:34
7.	"Colors of Death"	Gus Chambers	Waldemar Sorychta	3:04
8.	"Ostracized"	Gus Chambers	Waldemar Sorychta	3:08
9.	"Cleanse the Seed"	Gus Chambers	Waldemar Sorychta	4:55
10.	"Heretic War Chant"	Gus Chambers	Waldemar Sorychta	5:23
11.	"Longest Hate"	Gus Chambers	Waldemar Sorychta	5:01

== Personnel ==
- Gus Chambers – vocals
- Waldemar Sorychta – guitar, backing vocals
- Jason VieBrooks – bass
- Dave Lombardo – drums, percussion

== Technical Personnel ==
- Siggi Bemm - engineering
- Carsten Drescher, Media Logistics, Waldemar Sorychta - art direction and design
- Alex Solca - photography
- Günter Ford - management
