= Dismal Euphony =

Norwegian metal band

Background information
- Origin: Stavanger, Norway
- Genres: Symphonic black metal, melodic black metal, gothic metal
- Years active: 1994–2001
- Labels: Nuclear Blast, Napalm
- Past members: See below

Dismal Euphony was a Norwegian dark metal band that mixed styles including gothic metal, black metal, death metal, melodic metal, and classical music.

== History ==
The history of Dismal Euphony began in 1992 in Stavanger, Norway by bassist Ole K. Helgesen and drummer Kristoffer Vold Austrheim under the name The Headless Children, a cover band of Slayer and Kreator. A year later, singer Erik Borgen and guitarist Kenneth Bergsagel joined the group.

They changed the name to Carnal Tomb, then Borgen left the band and Helgesen became the singer/bassist with the female voice of Linn Achre Tveit (Keltziva). Elin Overskott joined the band as a keyboard player.

This was the first lineup of Dismal Euphony, officially formed in 1995. In the same year, the group composed the demo Spellbound. After this publication, they were signed by Napalm Records. Here they produced other albums like Soria Moria slott, Autumn Leaves: The Rebellion of Tides and the Lady Ablaze EP (which already features Anja Natasha as female singer).

Later, Dismal Euphony joined Nuclear Blast and released All Little Devils, with the new female singer Anja Natasha.

Their last album is Python Zero. After this release, the band split up.

== Band members ==
=== Last known lineup ===
- Ole Helgesen – bass, vocals
- Kristoffer Vold (a.k.a. Kristoffer Austrheim) – drums; also occasional guitars, bass and electronics
- Frode Clausen – guitars
- Svenn-Aksel Henriksen – keyboards
- Anja Natasha – vocals

=== Former members ===
- Dag Achre Tveit – bass
- Kenneth Bergsagel – guitars
- Elin Overskott – keyboards (1994–1998; died 2004)
- Erik Borgen – vocals (1994)
- Linn Achre Tveit – vocals (1994–1998)

== Discography ==
- Spellbound (demo, 1995)
- Dismal Euphony (EP, 1996)
- Soria Moria slott (1996)
- Autumn Leaves: The Rebellion of Tides (1997)
- All Little Devils (1999)
- Lady Ablaze (EP, 2000)
- Lady Ablaze (video/VHS, 2000)
- Python Zero (2001)
