= Drums of Death (album) =

Studio album by DJ Spooky & Dave Lombardo
- Released: 2005
- Genre: Hip-hop
- Label: Thirsty Ear Records

DJ Spooky & Dave Lombardo chronology
Optometry (2002)	Drums of Death (2005)

DJ Spooky chronology
Riddim Clash (2004)	Drums of Death (2005)	The Secret Song (2009)

Professional ratings
Review scores
Source	Rating
AllMusic	3.5/5 stars

Drums of Death is an album recorded by DJ Spooky and drummer Dave Lombardo. The album is primarily instrumental, although some tracks include rap vocals. Guest artists on the album include Public Enemy's Chuck D who does reworkings of several Public Enemy tracks, Dälek, and Living Colour guitarist Vernon Reid. The album is produced by Meat Beat Manifesto's Jack Dangers and Vernon Reid amongst others.

Drums of Death is distributed by the Thirsty Ear label.

== Track listing ==
1. "Universal Time Signal"
2. "Brother's Gonna Work It Out"
3. "Quantum Cyborg Drum Machine"
4. "Guitar DJ Tool Element"
5. "Metatron"
6. "Assisted Suicide"
7. "Kultur Krieg"
8. "Sounds from Planet X"
9. "The B-Side Wins Again"
10. "Incipit Zarathustra"
11. "A Darker Shade of Bleak"
12. "The Art of War"
13. "Terra Nullius (Cyborg Rebellion on Colony Planet Zyklon 15)"
14. "Public Enemy #1"
15. "Obscure Disorder (Ghost Hacked!!!)"
16. "Particle Storm"

== Personnel ==
- DJ Spooky: Production, mixing, turntables, beats, synthesizer, effects
- Dave Lombardo: Production, mixing, drums
- Jack Dangers: Production, mixing, bass, guitar, effects, production
- Vernon Reid: Production, mixing, guitar (3, 4, 12, 15)
- Chuck D: vocals (2, 9, 14)
- Meredith Monk: vocals (6)
- Dälek: vocals (6)
- Gerry Nestler: guitar (4, 7, 12, 13)
- Alex Artaud: electronics (1)

== Trivia ==
- The song "B-Side Wins Again" was featured on the soundtracks of Electronic Arts's Need For Speed Most Wanted, SSX On Tour, and Visual Concepts' NBA 2K6.
