= Dave Lombardo =

Cuban-American drummer (born 1965)

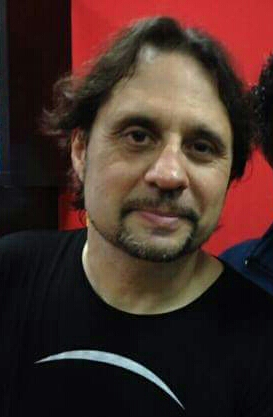
- Lombardo in 2014

Background information
- Born: David Lombardo; February 16, 1965 (age 61); Havana, Cuba
- Genres: Thrash metal; speed metal; heavy metal; groove metal; hardcore punk; experimental rock; punk rock
- Occupation: Musician
- Instrument: Drums
- Years active: 1979–present
- Member of: Dead Cross; Misfits; Mr. Bungle; Venamoris; Empire State Bastard; Fantômas
- Formerly of: Slayer; Grip Inc.; Voodoocult; Suicidal Tendencies; Testament
- Website: davelombardoofficial.com

David Lombardo (born February 16, 1965) is a Cuban-American drummer, best known as a co-founding member of the thrash metal band Slayer. He currently plays drums with Fantômas, Dead Cross, Mr. Bungle, Empire State Bastard, and Misfits.

Lombardo previously played drums on nine Slayer albums, including Reign in Blood (1986) and Christ Illusion (2006). His music career has spanned over 40 years, during which he has been involved in the production of 35 commercial recordings covering a number of genres. He has performed with numerous other bands, including Grip Inc., Testament and Fantômas, in addition to Slayer.

Lombardo is widely known as an aggressive heavy metal drummer. His drumming has been praised as "astonishingly innovative". Drummerworld named him "The Godfather of Double Bass". He has had a significant influence on the metal scene and inspired modern metal drummers, particularly extreme metal drummers.

== Biography ==
External videos
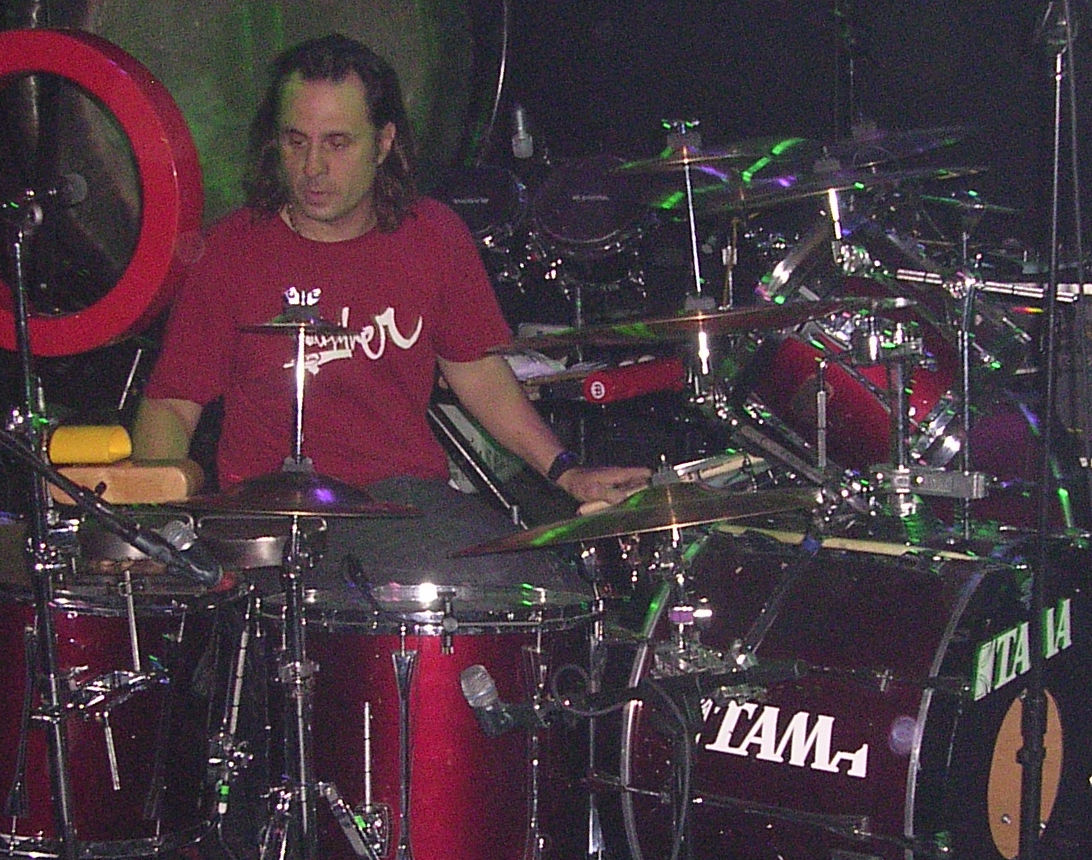
- Dave Lombardo Plays 'Wikipedia: Fact or Fiction?', Loudwire, 14:37

=== Early years ===
Lombardo was born in Havana, Cuba, on February 16, 1965, where his father owned three meat markets. He is of Italian descent through his paternal great-grandfather, who relocated to Cuba in the 19th century. Lombardo moved with his family to South Gate, California, when he was two years old, and still speaks Spanish. He has two older brothers and an older sister; his brothers had previously emigrated to the US via Operation Peter Pan. He is childhood friends with Cypress Hill rapper Sen Dog, who attended the same high school as him.

His musical interests were fueled by his first musical performance when he was eight years old; he played bongos to Santana's "Everybody's Everything". Lombardo joined his school's band and played the marching drum. After noticing his son's persistent interest in music, Lombardo's father bought him a five-piece Pearl Maxwin drum set for $350 when Lombardo was ten years old. Lombardo bought his first record, Alive! by Kiss, to play along with. He learned to play Kiss' "100,000 Years" by repeatedly listening to the record until he could play the drum solo perfectly.

Lombardo asked his parents for drum lessons. Although they agreed, the lessons were short-lived. Lombardo grew bored because the lessons were repetitive and did not challenge him. Lombardo's friends introduced him to disco, which appealed to his affinity for funk, Latin and soul. He became a temporary DJ for a mobile disc jockey under the name A Touch of Class. Unimpressed with their son coming home at 4:00 am, Lombardo's parents pressured him into quitting the DJ gig or face military school.

Lombardo returned to playing rock music in 1978 and befriended several like-minded musicians around South Gate. Lombardo attended Pius X High School. He performed Chuck Berry's "Johnny B. Goode" with a guitarist named Peter Fashing during the school's talent show. "I'll never forget the roar of the crowd during the drum solo. We brought the house down," said Lombardo, who became known as "David the Drummer" the following day. Lombardo soon formed a band named Escape with two guitarists. Lombardo found a vocalist to join the band after he transferred to South Gate High School in 1979. The band performed at several events under the name Sabotage, but the band was short-lived.

Lombardo's parents convinced him to quit the band because he was withdrawing from everything except music. Knowing her son was set on pursuing a life on the stage, Lombardo's mother asked him to at least graduate high school. He honored her wish and graduated from South Gate High School in June 1983. Immediately following, Lombardo was recommended by his technical drafting teacher to Diesel Energy Systems Company. Impressed with his skill, Lombardo was hired on the spot. Around this time, Lombardo's musical career was ready to take off.

== Musical career ==
=== Slayer ===
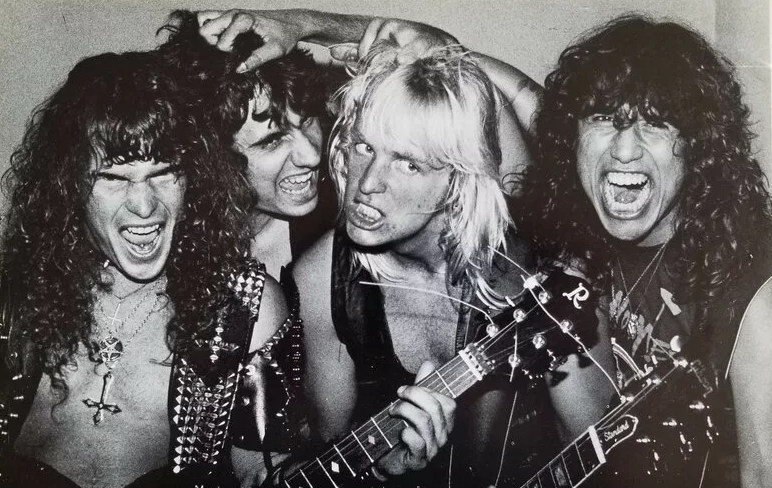
Lombardo (second from left) with Slayer in 1983

When he was 16, Lombardo's friends told him about a guitar player, Kerry King, who lived a few blocks away. Lombardo dropped by King's house to meet him. Lombardo introduced himself, mentioned he played drums, and shared that he wanted to start a band. King jammed with Lombardo and later showed Lombardo his guitar collection. The two quickly realized they shared some of the same musical interests. After rehearsing in Lombardo's garage several times, King introduced the drummer to another guitarist named Jeff Hanneman. The three rehearsed several times before they decided they needed a singer and bass player. King had previously played with Tom Araya in a band called Quits and decided to introduce Araya to Lombardo and Hanneman.

With Slayer's line-up now complete, Lombardo stabbed out the now iconic logo and the band began to develop their groundbreaking sound. Slayer recorded their debut album Show No Mercy soon after. Lombardo enlisted producer Rick Rubin for their third album Reign in Blood (1986). Lombardo left the band during their tour to promote Reign in Blood, stating, "I wasn't making any money. I figured if we were gonna be doing this professionally, on a major label, I wanted my rent and utilities paid." Tony Scaglione of Whiplash was enlisted to replace Lombardo. Unhappy with the change, Rick Rubin repeatedly called Lombardo asking his return. Lombardo initially refused before eventually returning to the band in 1987.

Lombardo recorded drums on the Slayer albums South of Heaven (1988) and Seasons in the Abyss (1990). He left the band again in 1992. Lombardo left Slayer because he wanted to be present for his first child's birth. Lombardo told his bandmates at the beginning of the pregnancy, stating he would be unable to tour the last two weeks of September. He got a phone call from Slayer's manager, Rick Sales, stating that they were booking a festival in September. Lombardo, however, was firm in his decision and insisted he would not miss his child's birth.

Ten years after leaving Slayer, Lombardo got a phone call from the band in 2001, asking if he would like to perform a few shows. Hanneman was eager for Dave to return, but King was less enthusiastic. King thought Lombardo was not up to snuff, but was "blown away" by Lombardo's performance in rehearsals. King later said, "He's got the feet and he's got the hands, he's not missing a step."

Lombardo decided to resume drumming duties. His first show was at Toad's Place in New Haven, Connecticut on January 24, 2002. At the beginning of the band's show at The 7 Flags Event Center near Des Moines, Iowa on February 2, 2002, Araya welcomed Lombardo's return and dedicated the show to Exodus vocalist Paul Baloff, who had died earlier that day. Lombardo toured with Slayer as part of Ozzfest, H82k2, Summer Tour, and the 2004 Download Festival. While preparing for the Download Festival in England, Metallica drummer Lars Ulrich was hospitalized for a mysterious illness. Metallica rhythm guitarist and vocalist James Hetfield searched for volunteers to replace Ulrich; Slipknot drummer Joey Jordison, Flemming Larsen (Ulrich's drum technician) and Lombardo volunteered. Lombardo performed the songs "Battery" and "The Four Horsemen", while Jordison and Larsen performed the rest of the songs.

Lombardo recorded drums on Slayer's 2006 release Christ Illusion, promoting the album on The Unholy Alliance tour. King said Lombardo was a major attraction for the fans, and one of the reasons for their surge in popularity. King and other band members preferred Lombardo on drums. Araya said, "It's kind of right back where we started. He's an amazing performer. We took off right where we left off, you know? It's like he was never gone. He's working with Kerry on his tunes. He's helped out a lot actually!"

Christ Illusion received generally favorable reviews with critics praising Lombardo's return. Chris Steffen of Rolling Stone wrote, "Christ Illusion is God Hates Us All without the memorable riffs, at least their awesome drummer Dave Lombardo shows off some chops, particularly on the raging 'Supremist.'" Don Kaye of Blabbermouth gave the album a favorable review and praised Lombardo. Kaye wrote, "One thing's for sure: Lombardo's influence on this band is absolutely undeniable. He is simply essential to the Slayer sound. He is one of metal's all-around best drummers, perhaps the very best in the field of thrash/speed metal, and his power, style, and chops – not to mention his intangible chemistry with the rest of the group and those amazing flying feet – bring Slayer's overall performance, intensity and music to a higher level."

Lombardo recorded another album with Slayer in 2009, titled World Painted Blood.

He left the band once again in February 2013 shortly before the band was scheduled to play Australia's Soundwave festival, due to further contract and pay disputes with band members.

Slayer's final concert was held on November 30, 2019. Lombardo stated that he had no interest in attending their final performances because he was busy with his own musical projects.

In 2022, he listed "Captor of Sin", "Ghosts of War", and "Beauty Through Order" as his favorite Slayer songs.

=== Grip Inc. ===
After the birth of his first child in 1993, Lombardo formed Grip Inc. with Voodoocult guitarist Waldemar Sorychta. The pair recruited bassist Jason VieBrooks and vocalist Gus Chambers to complete the line-up. An early five-piece line-up briefly featured former Overkill guitarist Bobby Gustafson who claims to have come up with the name Grip which Lombardo expanded to Grip Inc. after Gustafson's departure in order to avoid a potential lawsuit. Grip Inc.'s debut record was released in 1995. The album, titled Power of Inner Strength, was distributed via California-based label Metal Blade Records. AllMusic reviewer Vincent Jeffries singled out Lombardo for praise on the album, saying Slayer fans would "enjoy the drummer's double bass work and overall aggression throughout the disc." Sorychta claimed critics and music fans always spot mistakes in their music, because of Lombardo's popularity with Slayer—they expect the band to sound like Slayer and complain. However, when Lombardo uses the double bass drum, Sorychta said people complain "now Grip Inc. sound exactly like Slayer."

The band released Nemesis in 1997. Jeffries praised Lombardo's "crushing drum work" which takes center stage on the album. Bassist VieBrooks left the band in 1999; he was replaced by Stuart Carruthers. The band released Solidify later that year. The album was described as a step towards "progressive and exotic rhythms, structures, and instrumentation, while never compromising intensity". Lombardo was once again praised for his drumming on the album by Jeffries, who stated his style is "expressive and technically excellent tom work on cuts like 'Bug Juice' and 'Lockdown.'" Lombardo is proud of Grip Inc. and believes it made him more creative as a musician.

Lombardo recorded his final album with Grip Inc., Incorporated, in 2004. He said the band is on the "back burner" because of time taken up touring with Slayer.

=== Fantômas ===
In 1998, Lombardo joined a side project called Fantômas with Faith No More vocalist Mike Patton, Mr. Bungle bassist Trevor Dunn and Melvins' guitarist Buzz Osborne. The band formed when Lombardo was approached by Patton at a Faith No More concert; Patton asked Lombardo about his "fusion" project (Grip Inc.). Patton called Lombardo several months after Faith No More broke up and asked if Lombardo wanted to join Patton's fusion project. Lombardo enthusiastically agreed, "Fuck yeah!"

Lombardo later described Fantômas as the hardest music he has played: "Slayer doesn't even come close. Slayer was hard in a physical way, this is physically demanding and requires 'feeling'. (The kind of connectedness that demands) no clicking of sticks." The drummer described Fantômas' sound by stating "[I]f Picasso was a musician, this would be his music." Lombardo recorded four albums with the band.

=== Dead Cross ===
Lombardo revealed the formation of yet another new musical project, Dead Cross, in November 2015. With ruthless, hardcore punk music, Rolling Stone described the band as a "vicious statement of renewed intent from Lombardo, the most influential drummer of the past 30 years." Dead Cross announced on December 12, 2016, that Mike Patton would front the band. Produced by Ross Robinson and Dead Cross, the band released their eponymous debut album in August 2017.

=== Suicidal Tendencies ===
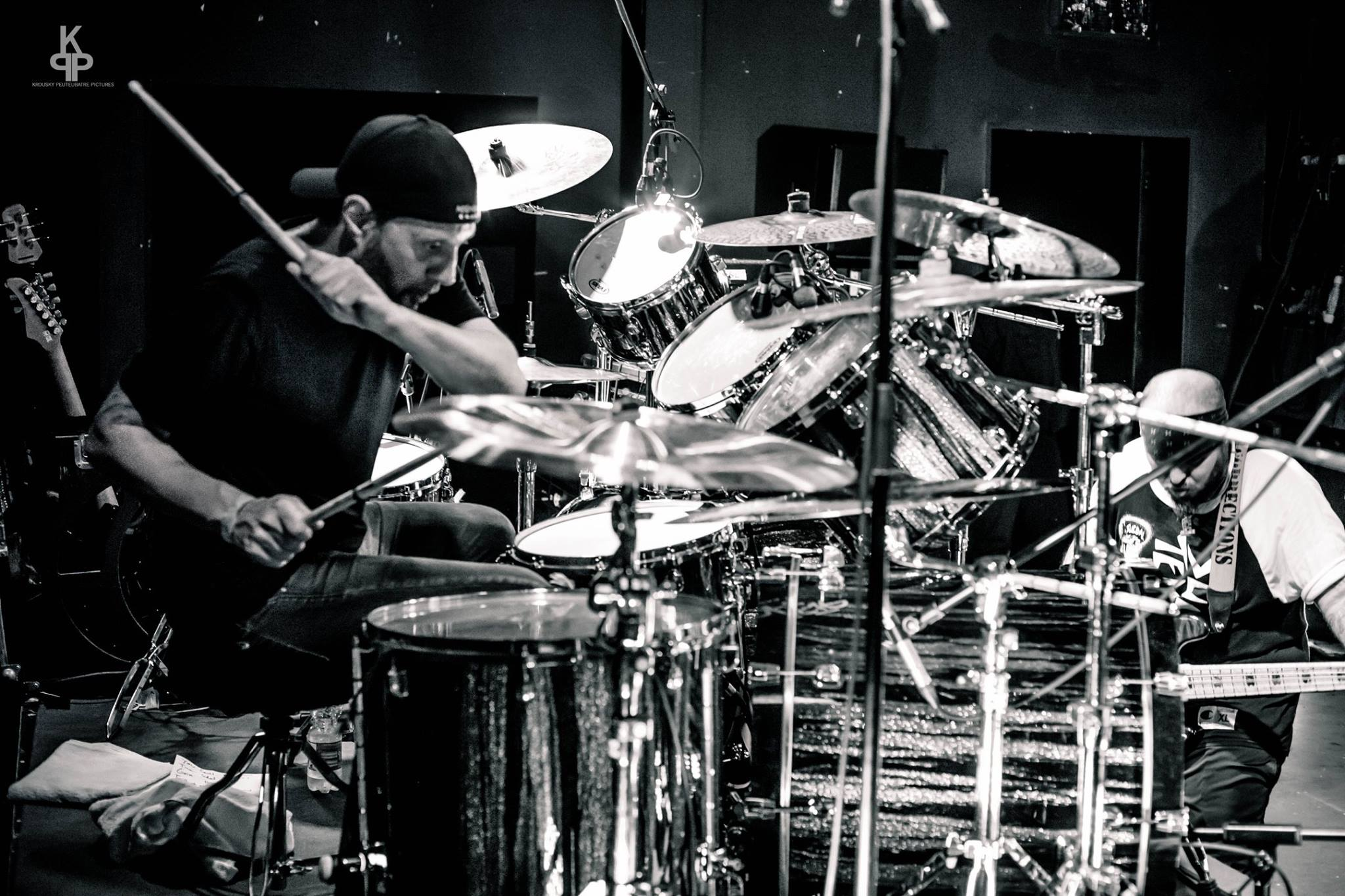
Lombardo performing with Suicidal Tendencies in 2016

Lombardo joined crossover thrash band Suicidal Tendencies in February 2016 and toured with the band for their spring tour with Megadeth and summer European dates. Fans speculated Lombardo was only playing with the band as a fill-in drummer. Those rumors were dispelled, however, when the band posted a video to their Instagram account on May 15, 2016. The video showed Lombardo recording drums for a new album, World Gone Mad. The album was released on September 30, 2016. He left Suicidal Tendencies in 2021.

=== Misfits ===
In August 2016, the Misfits announced Lombardo as their drummer for their reunion shows. Due to the success of the shows, the Misfits announced in August 2017 that they would do two more. Lombardo would again be on drums.

Lombardo performed two shows - one on December 28, 2017, at MGM Grand Garden Arena, Las Vegas and December 30, 2017, at the Forum, Los Angeles, California, in which all 16,000 tickets for the show were sold out in less than one minute.

Lombardo has continued to drum for them and has played at every reunion show from 2016 to the present year.

=== Mr. Bungle ===
In 2019, Lombardo was announced as the drummer for the seven upcoming Mr. Bungle reunion shows in 2020 in which the band performed their 1986 demo The Raging Wrath of The Easter Bunny. In 2020, the band rerecorded the demo, with Lombardo on drums. It was released on October 30, 2020.

=== Testament ===
In 1999, Lombardo performed drum work on the Testament album The Gathering, rounding off a veritable "supergroup" with Steve Di Giorgio and James Murphy. However, he left the band right before the album's world tour in 1999-2000.

On March 1, 2022, it was announced that Lombardo had rejoined Testament as the replacement of Gene Hoglan, who had left the band nearly two months earlier. His return to Testament occurred just one month before the start of his first major tour with the band, and they also plan to record a new album with him. Lombardo expressed uncertainty that he would return to Testament after announcing that he would be sitting out of the band's 2023 tour dates.

=== Side projects ===
In 1999, Lombardo collaborated with Italian classical musician Lorenzo Arruga to record Vivaldi – The Meeting. The seven-track album had drum improvisations on Vivaldi's work including two pieces from The Four Seasons composition. In 2000, Lombardo released a book titled Dave Lombardo: Power Grooves. The book and video contained warm ups, eight, sixteen, and double bass grooves, riding the toms and more.

He has appeared on two albums by John Zorn: Taboo and Exile (1999) and Xu Feng (2000) performing with Zorn, Bill Laswell, Fred Frith, William Winant and others. He also played in Paris with Zorn, Laswell and Frith in an improvisational quartet project called Blade Runner.

1999 also saw the release of avant-garde sculptor/filmmaker Matthew Barney's "Cremaster 2", inspired by the life of Gary Gilmore. Lombardo played an epic drum solo accompanied by a swarm of angry bees on the track "The Man in Black".

In 2005, Lombardo recorded Drums of Death with DJ Spooky. Spooky played some records with Lombardo playing along and interpreting his own rhythms. Spooky recorded the session and took the tapes to his New York recording studio, downloaded it onto his computer, and mixed the beats and drums incorporating scratching and other DJ techniques. Scott Peace-Miller of Glide Magazine noted, "Lombardo's influence is front and center in the driving, up tempo "Quantum Cyborg Drum Machine," and the almost straight-up thrash of Kultur Krieg."

Lombardo recorded six tracks with the Finnish cello metal group Apocalyptica on their 2003 album Reflections. Members of Apocalyptica had approached Lombardo in 1998 at a drum clinic in the Netherlands titled "Headbangers Fest", and asked if Lombardo would like to do a duo with the band, which he agreed to. Both Lombardo and Apocalyptica enjoyed playing a duo and Lombardo said to Apocalyptica, "Whenever you need a drummer, call me!". The band sent the recording tapes of Reflections to his home studio in California where he recorded the drums. Lombardo's later Apocalyptica contributions have consisted of playing the drums for the track "Betrayal/Forgiveness" on the 2005 album Apocalyptica for the track "Last Hope" on the 2007 album Worlds Collide and for the track "2010" on the 2010 album 7th Symphony.

In October 2009, it was announced that he had recorded a cover of "Stand by Me", featuring Lemmy on vocals and bass, and produced by DJ and producer Baron. The song was made for legendary pro skateboarder Geoff Rowley.

Lombardo has contributed to television and film scores including Dawn of the Dead, Insidious: Chapter 3, and the seventh season of the Showtime series Californication.

On March 1, 2023, Dave Lombardo was announced as touring drummer for a short run of UK shows by Empire State Bastard, the side project of Biffy Clyro frontman Simon Neil, and touring guitarist Mike Vennart.

== Style and legacy ==
Lombardo named Bill Ward, Mitch Mitchell, John Bonham, Ian Paice and Ginger Baker as main influences at early age. Some of his later inspirations include Clive Burr, Phil Taylor, D.H. Peligro, and Dale Crover.

He is known for his fast, aggressive style of play utilizing the double bass drum technique which has earned him the title "the godfather of double bass" by Drummerworld. Lombardo states his reasons for using two bass drums: "when you hit the bass drum the head is still resonating. When you hit it in the same place right after that you kinda get a 'slapback' from the bass drum head hitting the other pedal. You're not letting them breathe." In an interview with Guitar Center in the spring of 2012 he said: "I don't like a double pedal because when the beater hits, I immediately come back with the other pedal. And that head is resonating, which creates a momentum that isn't helpful. It throws me off balance. With two bass drums, I don't have any problems. It's just a feel thing." When playing the double bass, Lombardo uses the 'heel-up' technique and places his pedals at an angle. As well as considering him an influence, Arch Enemy drummer Daniel Erlandsson feels Lombardo is "really tasteful in his playing, and doesn't overplay. He's gifted with a groove that not many speed metal, or metal drummers generally, have."

In response to an interview question, "How talented is Dave Lombardo?" King responded, "Have you ever seen the movie The Natural? That's Dave. He doesn't have to try to be good. He comes into the venue 10 or 15 minutes before we hit the stage and he doesn't warm up. He just goes and does it, after me and Jeff [Hanneman, guitarist] have been warming up for like an hour." In an interview with Modern Drummer, Lombardo has stated that when he plays drum beats on the bass drums, he always begins with his left foot.

German newspaper Die Zeit named Slayer's Reign in Blood #79 on their list of 100 Classics of Modern Music, with critic Matthias Schönebäumer writing:

Above all, Reign In Blood is a big drummer's record: Dave Lombardo's fast and precise groove are at the eye of this metallic storm, which ends in a ghostly finale.

Lombardo's work has been an influence on many rock and heavy metal drummers. Per Möller Jensen of The Haunted cites Lombardo as a major influence, having grown up listening to Slayer; the band was a big influence on his style and The Haunted's. Suffocation drummer Mike Smith also cites Lombardo as an influence. Rocky Gray, former member of the alternative metal band Evanescence was influenced by Lombardo's choice of equipment; "All those old school guys are all TAMA guys. Where I'm from, if you're in the big time, you get a TAMA drum set. You have to be good if you've got a TAMA set."

Richard Christy, former member of Death was "blown away" by Lombardo's performance and double bass on the album Reign in Blood, as was Cannibal Corpse drummer Paul Mazurkiewicz. Raymond Herrera of the band Fear Factory cites Lombardo as one of his major influences, as do Pete Sandoval (Morbid Angel, Terrorizer), Igor Cavalera (Sepultura, Cavalera Conspiracy), Chris Pennie (The Dillinger Escape Plan), Adrian Erlandsson (Paradise Lost, Cradle of Filth, Brujeria), George Kollias (Nile, Nightfall), Joey Jordison (Slipknot), Dirk Verbeuren (Soilwork, Megadeth), Derek Roddy (Aurora Borealis, Nile, Hate Eternal), Mike Portnoy (Dream Theater, Adrenaline Mob), James Sullivan (Avenged Sevenfold), Steve Asheim (Deicide), Michael "Moose" Thomas (Bullet for My Valentine), Tony Laureano (Dimmu Borgir, Nile, Angelcorpse, Malevolent Creation), Dave Witte (Municipal Waste, Burnt by the Sun, Black Army Jacket), Max Kolesne (Krisiun), Patrick Grün (Caliban), Nick Barker (Cradle of Filth, Dimmu Borgir), Jason Bittner (Shadows Fall), and Brann Dailor (Mastodon).

Lombardo endorses and uses Tama Drums, Promark Drumsticks, Paiste Cymbals and Evans Drumheads. Lombardo is left handed, but drums right handed and plays a right handed kit.

== Art ==
Lombardo began the creation of his first art collection, "Rhythm Mysterium" in early 2014. To execute the project, Lombardo worked with art team Scene Four in Los Angeles, California. The art collection is titled "RHYTHM MYSTERIUM". Containing 13 works, the collection is built from the new medium of rhythm-on-canvas. In 2015, Lombardo released LOMBARDO, a book-and-vinyl set. The book is a comprehensive look at Dave Lombardo's artwork built from rhythm, and the vinyl contains Lombardo's improvised drum interpretations for each art piece within the book.

== Discography ==
Solo

- 2023: Rites of Percussion

Slayer

- 1983: Show No Mercy
- 1984: Haunting the Chapel (EP)
- 1984: Live Undead (Live album)
- 1985: Hell Awaits
- 1986: Reign in Blood
- 1988: South of Heaven
- 1990: Seasons in the Abyss
- 1991: Decade of Aggression (Live album)
- 2006: Christ Illusion
- 2009: World Painted Blood
- 2010: The Big 4 Live from Sofia, Bulgaria (Live DVD)

Grip Inc.

- 1995: Power of Inner Strength
- 1997: Nemesis
- 1999: Solidify
- 2004: Incorporated
- 2015: Hostage to Heaven (EP)

Fantômas

- 1999: Fantômas
- 2001: The Director's Cut
- 2002: Millennium Monsterwork 2000
- 2004: Delìrium Còrdia
- 2005: Suspended Animation
- 2005: Fantômas / Melt-Banana

Testament

- 1999: The Gathering

Philm

- 2012: Harmonic
- 2014: Fire from the Evening Sun

Suicidal Tendencies

- 2016: World Gone Mad
- 2018: Get Your Fight On! (EP)
- 2018: Still Cyco Punk After All These Years

Dead Cross

- 2017: Dead Cross
- 2018: Dead Cross (EP)
- 2022: II

Mr Bungle

- 2020 The Raging Wrath of the Easter Bunny Demo
- 2021: The Night They Came Home (Live Album)

Annihilator

- 2022: Metal II

Venamoris

- 2023: Drown in Emotion
- 2025: To Cross or to Burn

Empire State Bastard

- 2023: Rivers of Heresy

Other works

- 1994: Jesus Killing Machine – Voodoocult
- 1999: Cremaster 2
- 1999: Vivaldi The Meeting – Lorenzo Arruga, DAVE LOMBARDO & Friends
- 1999: Taboo & Exile – John Zorn
- 2000: Xu Feng – John Zorn
- 2003: Reflections – Apocalyptica
- 2004: Dawn of the Dead
- 2005: Apocalyptica – Apocalyptica ("Betrayal/Forgiveness")
- 2005: Drums of Death – with: DJ Spooky
- 2007: Worlds Collide – Apocalyptica ("Last Hope")
- 2009: Extremely Sorry – "Stand By Me", with Baron and Lemmy Kilmister
- 2010: 7th Symphony – Apocalyptica ("2010")
- 2013: The Mediator Between Head and Hands Must Be the Heart – Sepultura ("Obsessed")
- 2013: Californication
- 2014: The Monkey King
- 2015: Insidious: Chapter 3
- 2016: I.T.
- 2016: The Belko Experiment
- 2024: Plays Metallica, Vol. 2 - Apocalyptica ("Blackened")
