= Grip Inc. =

American groove metal band

Background information
- Origin: Los Angeles, California, U.S.
- Genre: Groove metal
- Years active: 1993–2006
- Label: Steamhammer
- Members: Dave Lombardo; Waldemar Sorychta; Gus Chambers

Grip Inc. was an American groove metal band and side project of drummer Dave Lombardo. The band was formed in 1993 and was signed to Steamhammer Records. They released four full-length albums in total.

== History ==
Following the birth of his first child in 1993, Lombardo formed Grip Inc. with Voodoocult guitarist Waldemar Sorychta. The pair recruited bassist Jason VieBrooks and vocalist Gus Chambers to complete the line-up, releasing their debut record Power of Inner Strength (1995), distributed via Metal Blade Records.

Prior to the album's release Lombardo described leaving Slayer as a career low, because he did not know what type of music to play. AllMusic reviewer Vincent Jeffries singled out Lombardo for praise on the album, remarking that Slayer fans "will enjoy the drummer's double bass work and overall aggression throughout the disc." Sorychta said critics and music fans always spot mistakes in their music, because of Lombardo's popularity with Slayer – expecting the band to sound like Slayer and complain. However, when Lombardo uses the double bass drum, Sorychta said people complain "now Grip Inc. sound exactly like Slayer."

The band released Nemesis in 1997. Jeffries praised Lombardo's "crushing drum work" which takes center stage on the album. Bassist VieBrooks left the band and was replaced by Stuart Carruthers in 1997. With a new bassist, the band released Solidify in 1999, which was described as a step towards "progressive and exotic rhythms, structures, and instrumentations, while never compromising intensity" by Jeffries.

== Members ==
=== Final line-up ===
- Gus Chambers – vocals (1993–2006; died 2008)
- Dave Lombardo – drums, percussion (1993–2006)
- Waldemar Sorychta – guitars (1993–2006), bass (1999–2006)

=== Former members ===
- Chaz Grimaldi – bass (1993)
- Bobby Gustafson – guitars (1993)
- Jason VieBrooks – bass (1993–1997)
- Stuart Carruthers – bass (1997–1999)

== Discography ==
=== Studio albums ===
| Title | Album details | Peak chart positions | | | |
| Title | Album details | GER | NLD | FRA | GRC |
|---|---|---|---|---|---|
| Power of Inner Strength | Released: March 7, 1995; Label: Steamhammer / SPV; Formats: CD, CS, LP, digital download | 91 | — | — | — |
| Nemesis | Released: February 25, 1997; Label: Steamhammer / SPV; Formats: CD, CS, LP, digital download | 75 | 94 | — | — |
| Solidify | Released: February 23, 1999; Label: Steamhammer / SPV; Formats: CD, CS, digital download | 58 | — | 65 | — |
| Incorporated | Released: March 16, 2004; Label: Steamhammer / SPV; Formats: CD | — | — | 140 | 45 |
| Hostage to Heaven EP | Released: June 9, 2015; Label: KFM; Formats: digital download | — | — | — | — |
"—" denotes a recording that did not chart or was not released in that territory.

=== Music videos ===
| Year | Title | Directed | Album |
|---|---|---|---|
| 1994 | "Ostracized" | — | Power of Inner Strength |
| 1997 | "Rusty Nail" | — | Nemesis |
| 2004 | "The Answer" | Kobayashi Mediaverbund | Incorporated |
| 2004 | "Curse (of the Cloth)" | — | Incorporated |
