= Xenomorph =

Alien franchise extraterrestrial species

Xenomorph (Alien)
- Alien and Alien vs. Predator race
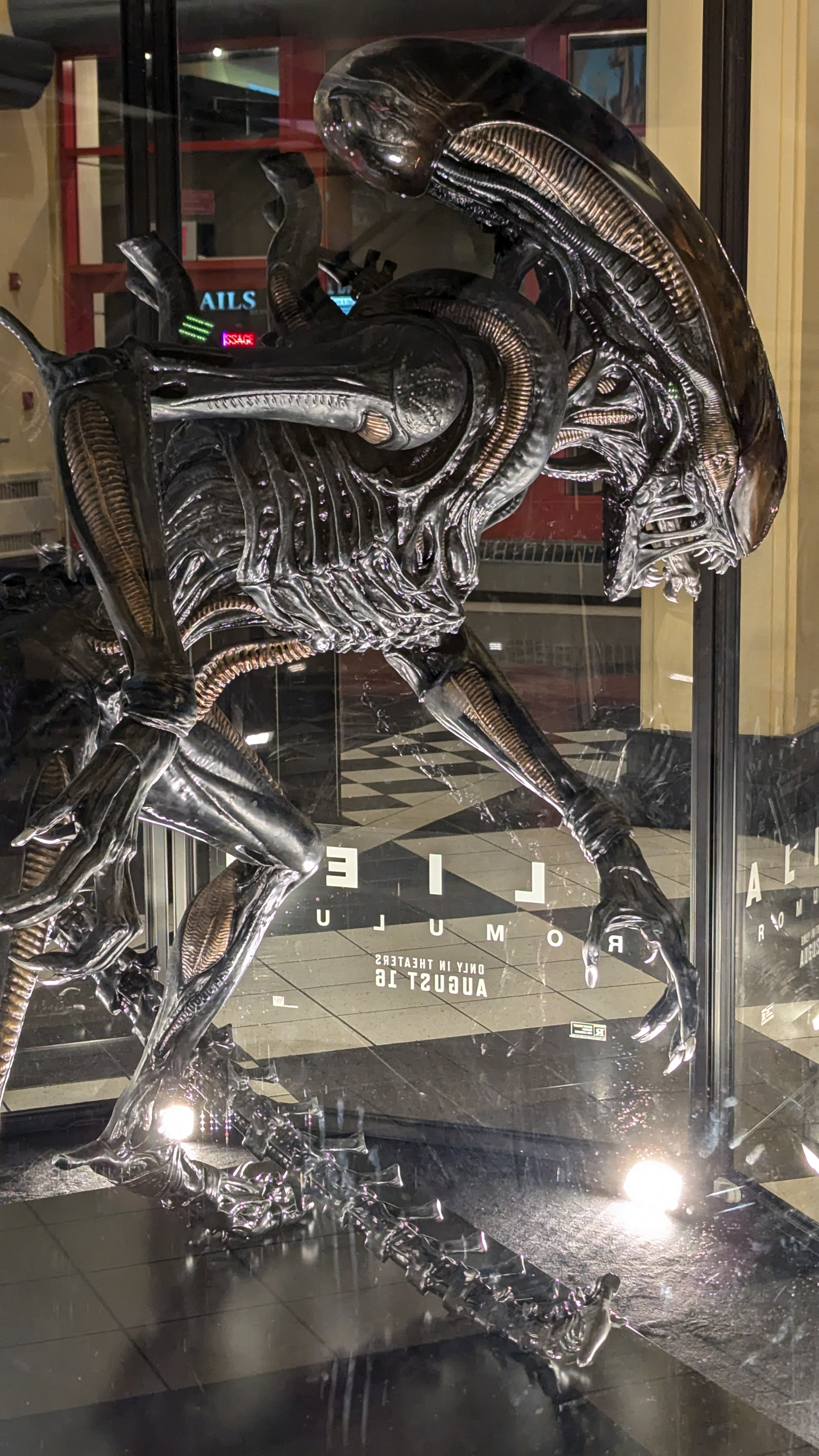
- Xenomorph as a design statue at Regal Cinemas LA Live in Los Angeles at the premiere of Alien: Romulus (2024)
- First appearance: Alien (1979)
- Created by: Dan O'Bannon; Ronald Shusett; Carlo Rambaldi; H. R. Giger; Ridley Scott

In-universe information
- Other names: Internecivus raptus; Linguafoeda acheronsis; Xenomorph; Serpent; Alien; Prey; Bug
- Type: Endoparasitoid lifeform

The Xenomorphs (also known as a XX121 xenomorph, Internecivus raptus, or simply the Alien or the creature (Note: Common term before the xenomorph crossed over into other universes, such as that of Predator)) are a fictional endoparasitoid extraterrestrial species and the titular main antagonists of both the Alien and Alien vs. Predator franchises from 20th Century Studios.

The species made its debut in the film Alien (1979) and reappeared in the sequels Aliens (1986), Alien 3 (1992), Alien Resurrection (1997), and Alien: Romulus (2024). The species returns in the prequel series, first with a predecessor in Prometheus (2012) and a further evolved form in Alien: Covenant (2017), and the 2019 short films Alien: Containment, Specimen, Night Shift, Ore, Harvest, and Alone. It also featured in the crossover films Alien vs. Predator (2004) and Aliens vs. Predator: Requiem (2007), with the skull and tail of one of the creatures respectively appearing briefly in Predator 2 (1990), Predator: Concrete Jungle (2005), Predators (2010), and The Predator (2018), as a protagonist (named 6) in the video game Aliens vs. Predator (2010). It also returned in the FX television series Alien: Earth (2025–present). In addition, the xenomorph appears in various literature and video game spin-offs from the franchises.

The xenomorph's design is credited to Swiss surrealist and artist H. R. Giger, originating in a lithograph titled Necronom IV and refined for the series's first film, Alien. The practical effects for the xenomorph's head were designed and constructed by Italian special effects designer Carlo Rambaldi. Species design and life cycle have been extensively augmented, sometimes inconsistently, throughout each film.

Unlike many other extraterrestrial races in film and television science fiction (such as the Daleks and Cybermen in Doctor Who, or the Klingons and Borg in Star Trek), the xenomorphs are not sapient toolmakers — they lack a technological civilization of any kind, and are instead primal, predatory creatures with no higher goal than the preservation and propagation of their own species by any means necessary, up to and including the elimination of other lifeforms that may pose a threat to their existence. Like wasps or termites, xenomorphs are eusocial, with a single fertile queen breeding a caste of warriors, workers, or other specialist strains. The xenomorphs' biological life cycle involves traumatic implantation of endoparasitoid larvae inside living hosts; these "chestburster" larvae erupt from the host's body after a short incubation period, mature into adulthood within hours, and seek out more hosts for implantation.

== Concept and creation ==
Necronom IV, Giger's 1976 surrealist print that formed the basis for the Alien's design

The script for the 1979 film Alien was initially drafted by Dan O'Bannon and Ronald Shusett. Dan O'Bannon drafted an opening in which the crew of a mining ship is sent to investigate a mysterious message on an alien planet. He eventually settled on the threat being an alien creature; however, he could not conceive of an interesting way for it to get onto the ship. Inspired after waking from a dream, Shusett said, "I have an idea: the monster screws one of them", planting its egg in his body, and then bursting out of his chest. Both realized the idea had never been done before, and it subsequently became the core of the film. "This is a movie about alien interspecies rape", O'Bannon said in the documentary Alien Evolution. "That's scary because it hits all of our buttons." O'Bannon felt that the symbolism of "homosexual oral rape" was an effective means of discomforting male viewers.

The title of the film was decided late in the script's development. O'Bannon had quickly dropped the film's original title, Star Beast, but could not think of a name to replace it. "I was running through titles, and they all stank", O'Bannon said in an interview, "when suddenly, that word alien just came out of the typewriter at me. Alien. It's a noun and it's an adjective." The word alien subsequently became the title of the film and, by extension, the name of the creature itself.

Prior to writing the script to Alien, O'Bannon had been working in France for Chilean cult director Alejandro Jodorowsky's planned adaptation of Frank Herbert's novel Dune. Also hired for the project was Swiss surrealist artist H. R. Giger. Giger showed O'Bannon his nightmarish, monochromatic artwork, which left O'Bannon deeply disturbed. "I had never seen anything that was quite as horrible and at the same time as beautiful as his work," he remembered later. The Dune film collapsed, but O'Bannon would remember Giger when Alien was greenlit, and suggested to director Ridley Scott that he be brought on to design the Alien, saying that if he were to design a monster, it would be truly original.

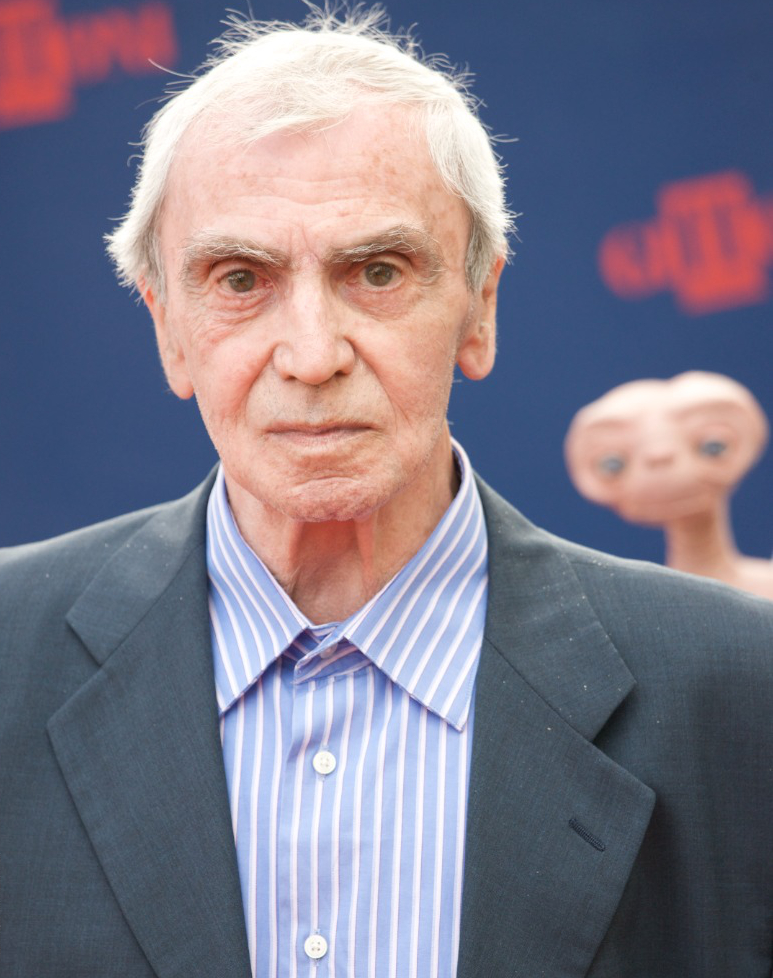
Carlo Rambaldi, the creator of the mechanical head-effects for the creature, was most famous for designing the title character of the film E.T. the Extra-Terrestrial.

After O'Bannon handed him a copy of Giger's book Necronomicon, Scott immediately saw the potential for Giger's designs, and chose Necronom IV, a print Giger completed in 1976, as the basis for the Alien's design, citing its beauty and strong sexual overtones. That the creature could just as easily have been male or female was also a strong factor in the decision to use it. "It could just as easily fuck you before it killed you," said line producer Ivor Powell, "[which] made it all the more disconcerting." 20th Century Fox was initially wary of allowing Giger onto the project, saying that his works would be too disturbing for audiences, but eventually relented. Giger initially offered to completely design the Alien from scratch, but Scott mandated that he base his work on Necronom IV, saying that to start over from the beginning would be too time-consuming. Giger initially signed on to design the adult, egg, and chestburster forms, but ultimately also designed the alien planetoid LV-426 and the "space jockey" alien vessel.

Giger conceived the Alien as being vaguely human but a human in full armor, protected from all outside forces. He mandated that the creature have no eyes because he felt that it made them much more frightening if one could not tell they were looking at them. Giger also gave the Alien's mouth a second inner set of pharyngeal jaws located at the tip of a long, tongue-like proboscis which could extend rapidly for use as a weapon. His design for the creature was heavily influenced by an aesthetic he had created and termed biomechanical, a fusion of the organic and the mechanical. His mock-up of the Alien was created using parts from an old Rolls-Royce car, rib bones and the vertebrae from a snake, molded with plasticine. The Alien's animatronic head, which contained 900 moving parts, was designed and constructed by special effects designer Carlo Rambaldi. Giger and Rambaldi together would win the 1980 Academy Award for Visual Effects for their design of the Alien.

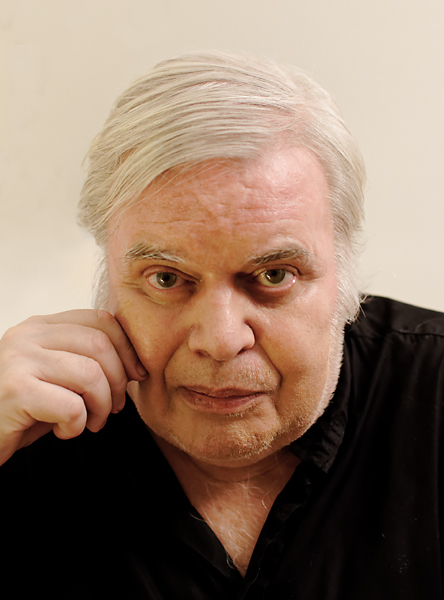
H. R. Giger, who designed and worked on the Alien and its accompanying elements

Scott decided on the man-in-suit approach for creating the creature onscreen. Initially, circus performers were tried, then multiple actors together in the same costume, but neither proved scary. Deciding that the creature would be scarier the closer it appeared to a human, Scott decided that a single, very tall, very thin man would be used. Scott was inspired by a photograph of Leni Riefenstahl standing next to a 6 ft 4 in (1.93 m) Nuba man. The casting director found 6 ft 10 in (2.08 m), rail-thin graphic designer Bolaji Badejo in a London pub. Badejo went to tai chi and mime classes to learn how to slow down his movements.

Giger's design for the Alien evoked many contradictory sexual images. As critic Ximena Gallardo notes, the creature's combination of sexually evocative physical and behavioral characteristics creates "a nightmare vision of sex and death. It subdues and opens the male body to make it pregnant, and then explodes it in birth. In its adult form, the alien strikes its victims with a rigid phallic tongue that breaks through skin and bone. More than a phallus, however, the retractable tongue has its own set of snapping, metallic teeth that connects it to the castrating vagina dentata."

=== Name ===
This creature has no specific name; it was called an alien and an organism in the first film. It has also been referred to as a creature, a serpent, a beast, a dragon, a monster, a nasty, or simply, a thing. The term xenomorph (lit. "alien form" from the Greek xeno-, which translates as either "other" or "strange", and -morph, which denotes shape) was first used by the character Lieutenant Gorman in Aliens to refer to extraterrestrial life in general. The term was erroneously assumed by some fans to refer specifically to this creature, and the word was used by the producers of some merchandise.

The species' binomial names are given in Latin as either Internecivus raptus (meant as "murderous thief") in the Alien Quadrilogy DVD or Lingua foeda acheronsis (meant as "foul tongue from Acheron") (Note: With acheronsis instead of acheronensis, acherontea or acheruntica.) in some comic books. The main Alien from Alien vs. Predator is listed in the credits as "Grid", after a grid-like wound received during the film from a Predator's razor net. Alien: Covenant actually credits the Alien as "Xenomorph", while also listing a different variety of the creature as the "Neomorph". In The Weyland-Yutani Report, the Alien encountered by the Nostromo was specifically referred to as "Xenomorph XX121", and this name is spoken out loud by the android Rook in Alien: Romulus.

== Characteristics ==
Ridley Scott stated in the DVD commentary for Alien (and the accompanying 2001 DVD documentary Alien Evolution) that the concept behind the origin of the xenomorphs is that nothing so deadly could have evolved naturally, but was instead designed through genetic engineering by some other ancient race as a biological weapon. He described the crashed Derelict encountered by the Nostromo as essentially a "bomber" that would carry payloads of xenomorph eggs and drop them onto targeted planets. This concept was present since work on the first film, though Scott went on to refine and expand on it over thirty years later in the prequel Prometheus – which established that not only were the xenomorphs created by the "Engineers" (the race of the "Space Jockey" the Nostromo crew found), but specifically formed using a hostile mutagenic pathogen (the "black goo" termed "Chemical A0-3959X.91").

The second core concept was that in order to keep the monster horrifying and unpredictable, it would metamorphosize through several radically different life stages – one of which involved a larval stage gestating inside of a human host before fatally bursting out.

Another concept present since Scott's production on the original film is that xenomorphs have flexible genetic material which is designed to adapt to whatever environment they are in, by incorporating some genetic information from their host that is native to that environment. The xenomorph on the Nostromo has a bipedal humanoid stature because its larval form gestated inside of a human, resulting in what Scott described as "the man-version of Alien". Subsequent spinoffs demonstrated variations on this concept: a xenomorph gestated inside of a quadruped like a dog or ox results in a quadrupedal, panther-like xenomorph (Alien 3), and one gestated inside of a Predator/Yautja will become a powerfully built "Predalien" with mandibles (Alien vs. Predator).

=== Appearance ===
When standing upright, the Aliens are bipedal in form, though, depending on their host species, they will adopt either a hunched stance or remain fully erect when walking, sprinting, or in hotter environments. Their overall stance and general behavior seem to result from the mixture of the respective DNA of the embryo and its host. They have a skeletal, biomechanical appearance and are usually colored in muted shades of black, gray, blue or bronze. Their body heat matches the ambient temperature of the environment in which they are found, so they do not radiate heat, making them indistinguishable from their surroundings through thermal imaging. In most of the films, adult Aliens are capable of running and crawling along ceilings, walls, and other hard surfaces. They have great physical strength, having been shown to be capable of breaking through welded steel doors over time.

Aliens have segmented, blade-tipped tails. The sharp tip was initially a small, scorpion-like barb, but from Aliens onwards the blade design increased in size and changed in appearance to more closely resemble a slashing weapon. From Alien Resurrection onwards, the tails have a flat ridge of spines at the base of the blade. This was introduced to help them swim convincingly, and was left intact in the subsequent crossovers. The original shooting script for Aliens and the novelization both featured a scene in which Lieutenant Gorman is "stung" by the barb tail and rendered unconscious; in the final cut of the movie, Gorman is knocked out by falling crates. As a weapon, the strength of the tail is very effective, having been shown to be strong enough to impale and lift a Predator with seemingly little effort.

The aliens have elongated, cylindrical skulls. In the novelization of Alien, the character Ash speculates that the xenomorphs "see" by way of electrical impulse, similar to some fish's Ampullae of Lorenzini. This method is illustrated in the original Aliens Versus Predator PC game and reused for the Predalien 8 years later. The Alien's inner set of jaws on its tongue is powerful enough to smash through bone and metal. How the creatures see is uncertain; in Alien 3, a spherical lens was used to illustrate the Alien's point of view, so, when the film was projected anamorphically, the image exhibited severe distortion. In the novelization of the movie Alien, the creature is held mesmerized by a spinning green light for several minutes.

In Aliens, the adult creatures have a more textured head rather than a smooth carapace. In the commentary for Aliens, it was speculated that this was part of the maturation of the creatures, as they had been alive far longer than the original Alien, although James Cameron stated that he simply left the carapace off because he liked them better that way. The smooth design of the carapace would be used again in Alien 3 and Alien Resurrection, although made narrower with a longer muzzle and more prominent chin. This design would be kept in Alien versus Predator, and abandoned in Aliens vs. Predator: Requiem in favor of the ribbed design.

Throughout their appearances, human-spawned Aliens have been shown to have different numbers of fingers. In Alien, the creature has webbed, six-fingered hands. In Aliens, the number of fingers is reduced to three, with two "paired" and a single, opposable thumb. The fingers are also shown to be much longer and more skeletal. In Alien Resurrection, the number of digits is increased to four, with two long middle fingers and a pair of thumbs. This design is kept in the Alien vs. Predator films, though the hands were made bulkier in order to make the Aliens seem more formidable against the Predators.

Aliens have been alternatively portrayed as both plantigrade and digitigrade organisms, usually relative to their hosts. Human-spawned Aliens were usually portrayed as having humanoid hind limbs, while in Alien 3 the featured Alien sported double-jointed legs due to its quadrupedal host. This characteristic would be continued in Alien Resurrection for the human-spawned Aliens, which may be due to their queen having been cloned using Ripley's (human) DNA, thus muddling their genetics such that they inherited their queen's double-jointed legs. Tom Woodruff, who had previously played the "dog-alien" in Alien 3, described the human-spawned Aliens in Resurrection as feeling more like a dog than the previous creature, despite having been born from human hosts. The human-spawned Alien warriors would revert to a plantigrade posture in Alien vs. Predator. In Alien: Isolation, the human-spawned aliens are again portrayed with digitigrade legs. Lead game designer Gary Napper justified this on the grounds that plantigrade legs would cause the creature's movements to appear excessively humanoid and thus unconvincing; particularly while sprinting or when in prolonged encounters with the player.

=== Physiology ===
Alien blood contains concentrated hydrofluoric acid and sulfuric acid and is capable of corroding almost any substance on contact with alarming speed. It is dull yellow in color and appears to be pressurized inside the body so that it spurts out with great force when the creature is wounded. Ron Cobb suggested the idea of the Alien having acidic blood as a plausible means to make the creature "unkillable"; if one were to use traditional firearms or explosives to attack it, its blood would eat through the hull of the ship. The Alien novelization suggests that, at least at the "facehugger" stage, the acid is not blood but a fluid maintained under pressure between a double layer of skin. In the Aliens vs. Predator: Requiem documentary "Science of the Alien", it is hypothesized that the Aliens' acid blood could contain sulfuric acid due to its corrosiveness and the conspicuously toxic effects on living human tissue. The documentary also speculates that Aliens are immune to their own acidic and toxic liquids due to an endobiological build-up, similar to the human stomach's ability to protect itself from its own digestive fluids. The documentary takes this hypothesis one step further and speculates that the Alien organism's protection system against its own acidic blood is a bio-organically produced Teflon-like insulation. In the original Alien, the facehugger is shown to be able to "spit" acid, dissolving the faceplate of Kane's helmet and allowing the creature immediate access inside. This ability is also exhibited by adult Aliens in Alien 3 and Alien Resurrection; much like a spitting cobra, they use it to blind their victims.

Aliens can produce a thick, strong resin that they use to build their hives and to cocoon their victims, and they can use the walls of their hives as camouflage. Aliens also salivate heavily in the form of a sticky, clear slime; while not a toxic substance in and of itself, it is common for the Alien films to use it as a suspense-building device, wherein a character will notice the falling saliva before noticing its source lying in wait above them.

=== Intelligence ===
During various events in Alien Resurrection on the USM Auriga, the crossover film Alien vs. Predator, Aliens on the LV-426 colony Hadley's Hope, and Alien 3 when they are trying to trap the alien, the species displayed observational learning and problem-solving skills. It's also shown the ability to operate machinery at a very basic level, with the queen in Aliens depicted operating an elevator.

On the USM Auriga in Alien Resurrection, the aliens kill one of their own, using its blood to melt through their enclosure and escape (according to the novelization, it was inspired to do so from genetic memories inherited from the original Ripley); in Alien vs. Predator, they use a similar strategy to free the queen from her chains. An alien also uses acid spurting from its severed tail as an improvised weapon by flicking it, indicating awareness of the effects of their acid blood.

In the original film, it is implied that the alien cut the lights on board the Nostromo. On LV-426, the xenomorphs cut power in a section of the complex to gain access to the humans.

The novel for the film Aliens includes a scene where Bishop speculates on the reason why the queen established her "nest" at the base's main power plant. His reasons range from an animalistic drive for warmth to an intentional strategic selection (any attacker could not destroy her without destroying the entire facility). In the director's commentary for Aliens, James Cameron noted that the creatures in Aliens had been alive for far longer than the Alien in the original, and had more time to learn about their environment. In Alien 3, Ripley and the inmates try luring the Alien into the lead works. It becomes obvious that the Alien recognized the trap and the danger it held. At one point, it hesitates to enter the lead works. Later, it hunts down most of the prisoners just before going into the lead works. In the video game Alien Isolation, the Alien will be more cautious when threatened with the flamethrower after multiple uses against it, and will begin to adapt to the player's methods of staying hidden, such as checking lockers or underneath furniture more often.

=== Life cycle ===
Aliens are eusocial life-forms with a caste system ruled over by a queen. Their life cycle comprises several distinct stages: they begin their lives as an ovamorph pod, which releases a parasitoid larval form known as a facehugger, which then attaches itself to a living host by, as its name suggests, latching onto its face. In the Alien 3 novelization, Ripley commented that this parasitoid would probably be able to use any host from as small as a cat to as large as an Asian elephant.

The facehugger then "impregnates" the host with an embryo, known as a "chestburster". (Note: The terms facehugger and chestburster date at least as far back as The Book of Alien and HR Giger's Alien—behind-the-scenes scrapbooks composed the year of the original film's release—and are used frequently by the film's cast and crew in retrospectives.) During this time, the host is kept in an unconscious state with normal vital functions. After depositing the embryo inside the host, the facehugger dies and releases its hold on its victim's face and head, as shown in Alien and Aliens. The host will then experience a short period of near-symptomless recovery during which the embryo is in gestation, followed by the sudden and painful eruption of the chestburster from the host's chest, resulting in their death. The chestburster then matures to an adult phase, shedding its skin and replacing its cells with polarized silicon.

Due to horizontal gene transfer during the gestation period, the alien also takes on some of the basic physical attributes of the host from which it was born (something noticed by Ripley in Alien 3, when the xenomorph plaguing the complex moved on four limbs, having gestated within a quadruped (a dog in the theatrical release and an ox in the director's cut) whereas all the others she had previously seen had gestated within humans/bipeds), allowing the individual alien to adapt to the host's environment (breathe the air, etc.). This is also shown in the two live-action crossover films, Alien vs. Predator (2004) and Aliens vs. Predator: Requiem (2007), where an embryo, having gestated within a Predator/Yautja, displayed Predator/Yautja physical traits (arthropod-like mandibles) from eruption onwards.

This process of horizontal gene transfer is also shown to be two-way; in Alien Resurrection (film and novelization), Ripley's clone, Ripley-8, is shown exhibiting numerous xenomorph characteristics, physical and behavioural; this is touched more upon in the novelization (chapter 4), where it is described that when a host is infested with a xenomorph embryo, it does not just infest the host like a parasite, but also like a virus, "a major breakthrough in adaptive evolution ... a way to guarantee that any host, any host at all, would provide whatever it was the developing embryo needed, even if/when the host's body was inadequate."

The adult phase of the alien is known by various different names. The adult aliens have been referred to as "drones", "warriors", "workers", and sometimes "soldiers", similar to the way ants have been defined. The names of the adult phase have also been used to name different types of adult phases of the alien in numerous sources, including video games, comic books, novels, and the films, but only in the commentaries by the team who created the films. No official name has been given to the adult stage of the alien in the films themselves.

==== Queen ====
Ripley and Newt encounter a queen in Aliens.

Queen aliens are significantly larger and stronger than the normal adults, being approximately 4.5 metres (15 ft) tall. Their body structure also differs, having two pairs of arms, one large and one small. The queen's head is larger than those of other adult Aliens and is protected by a large, flat crest, like a crown, which varies from queen to queen. Unlike other aliens, the queen's external mouth is separately segmented from the rest of her head, allowing her to turn her mouth left and right almost to the point where it is facing perpendicular to the direction of the rest of her head. In the second film, Aliens, unlike other adults and queens, the queen had high-heel protrusions from her feet. Her skin is very strong compared to other xenomorphs.

Egg-laying Alien queens possess an immense ovipositor attached to their lower torso, similar to a queen termite's. Like some insect queens, there appears to be no need for an Alien queen's eggs to be fertilized. When attached to her ovipositor, the queen is supported by a "biomechanical throne" that consists of a lattice of struts resembling massive insect legs.

In the original cut of Alien, the Alien possessed a complete lifecycle, with the still-living bodies of its victims converted into eggs. However, a scene showing crew members Brett and Dallas being converted into cocoons was cut for reasons of pacing, leaving the ultimate origin of the eggs obscure. This allowed Aliens director James Cameron to introduce a concept he had initially conceived for a spec script called Mother, a massive mother Alien queen which laid eggs and formed the basis for the Aliens' life cycle. Cameron conceived the queen as a monstrous analogue to Ripley's own maternal role in the film. In that vein, some critics have compared it to Grendel's mother.

The queen was designed by Cameron in collaboration with special effects artist Stan Winston, based upon an initial painting Cameron had done at the start of the project. The Winston Studio created a test foamcore queen before constructing the full hydraulic puppet which was used for most of the scenes involving the large Alien. Two people were inside working the twin sets of arms, and puppeteers off-screen worked its jaws and head. Although at the end of the film, the queen was presented full-body fighting the power-loader, the audience never sees the legs of the queen, save those of the small-scale puppet that appears only briefly. In Aliens, Cameron used very selective camera-angles on the queen, using the 'less is more' style of photography. Subsequently, the movie won an Oscar for Visual Effects. An adult queen was to reappear in Alien Resurrection. The original mechanical head previously used in Aliens was provided by Bob Burns and was an altered design. It was repainted with a blend of green and brown, giving it a shimmering, insect-like quality. This color concept would be abandoned in Alien vs. Predator in favour of the original black color scheme.

In the climax of Alien vs. Predator, the queen's basic design was altered to make her more "streamlined" in appearance and her overall size was increased to six meters (20 feet) tall. Other changes include the removal of the "high-heel" protrusions on her legs, including additional spines on her head and making her waist thinner because there was no need for puppeteers inside her chest. The animatronic queen had 47 points of hydraulic motion.

Aliens vs. Predator: Requiem (2007) introduced a younger form of the full-grown queen, albeit with traits inherited from its Predator host. Recalling the facehugger's method of embryo implantation, the Predalien uses its inner mouth to directly deposit multiple chestburster embryos into pregnant female hosts, also using its mandibles to latch on the faces of said hosts, completely bypassing the need for facehuggers. This is explained by the Brothers Strause as a means of quickly building an army of Aliens before the young queen evolves into her sedentary, egg-laying state and can no longer defend herself.

There are some other stages that are after queen but they are only mentioned in the comics and rpg that being the empress and queen mother. queen's submit to empress's and empress's submit to their queen mother.

==== Egg ====
Adult xenomorphs are capable of creating their own reproductive egg ("ovomorph") by embedding their prey into an organic substance that (in theory) metabolically reacts to merge host-parasite genetic material. The entire process is xeno-dominant, resulting in a facehugger. The eggs laid by the queen are ellipsoidal, leathery objects between one-half and one meter (two and three feet) high with a four-lobed opening at the top. The eggs can remain in a stasis mode for years, possibly indefinitely, until nearby movement is detected. As a potential host approaches, the egg's lobes unfold like flower petals, and the parasitic facehugger extracts itself from the egg and attaches itself to the potential host.

Giger initially designed the eggs with a much more obvious vaginal appearance, complete with an "inner and outer vulva". The producers complained that Catholic countries would ban the film if the allusion was too strong, so Giger doubled the lobes to four so that, in his words, "seen from above, they would form the cross that people in Catholic countries are so fond of looking at".

The interior of the original egg was composed of "Nottingham lace" (caul fat), which is the lining of a cow's stomach. In the first film, the quick shot of the facehugger erupting from the egg was done with sheep's intestine. Initially, the egg remained totally stationary except for the hydraulic movement of the lobes; however, by Alien Resurrection, the entire egg was made to ripple as it opened. In the Director's Cut of Alien, an additional scene shows still living crew members being cocooned into new eggs, either morphing into a new embryo or acting as a food source for the facehugger inside the egg. According to the novelization for Resurrection, the Egg, in and of itself, could be considered a living organism in its own right.

==== Facehugger ====
A facehugger attached to Kane in Alien

A facehugger is the second stage in the Alien's metamorphosis. It has eight long, finger-like legs, which allow it to crawl rapidly, and a long tail adapted for making great leaps. These particular appendages give it an appearance somewhat comparable to chelicerate arthropods such as arachnids and horseshoe crabs.

The facehugger is a parasitoid; its only purpose is to make contact with the host's mouth for the implantation process by gripping its legs around the host's head and wrapping its tail around the host's neck. Upon making contact, the facehugger administers a cynose-based paralytic in order to render the host unconscious and immobile. During a successful attachment, the facehugger will insert an ovipositor down the host's throat while simultaneously implanting a sample of Plagiarus praepotens (as depicted in Alien: Romulus and Alien: Earth), which reprograms the host's body to grow an embryo. The host is kept alive via the facehugger supplying oxygen. Attempts to remove facehuggers generally prove fatal to the host, as the facehugger will respond by tightening its tail around the host's neck, and its acidic blood prevents it from being cut away; moreover, if forcibly removed the facehugger's grip is strong enough to tear off the host's face.

Once the Alien embryo is implanted, the facehugger will remain attached until the implant is secure, which can take anywhere from less than a minute to 16 hours. Once this happens, the facehugger detaches, crawls away, and dies. The victim awakens with no awareness of the implantation, believing themselves to have been asleep, and appears to have a normal, healthy bodily function.

According to AVPR: Science of the Xenomorph, a behind-the-scenes documentary on Aliens vs. Predator: Requiem, it is theorized that facehuggers may implant a viral agent that "commands" the host's cells to grow the chestburster, as opposed to an implanted embryo. This is an alternate explanation to horizontal gene transfer as to how the resulting xenomorph is able to adopt the characteristics of its host.

Giger's original design for the facehugger was a much larger creature with eyes and a spring-loaded tail. Later, in response to comments from the filmmakers, Giger reduced the creature's size substantially. At first, Giger assumed that the facehugger would wrap around the outside of the astronaut's helmet, but Scott decided that it would have far more impact if the facehugger was revealed once the helmet was removed. Scott and Giger realized that the facehugger should burn through the helmet's faceplate with its acid blood; subsequent redesigns of the space helmet included a far larger faceplate to allow for this.

Dan O'Bannon initially conceived the facehugger as somewhat resembling an octopus, possessing tentacles. However, when he received H. R. Giger's designs, which substituted finger-like digits for tentacles, he found Giger's design concept to be superior. Since no one was available at the time, O'Bannon decided to design the facehugger prop himself. The technical elements of the musculature and bone were added by Ron Cobb. Giger's initial design for the smaller facehugger had the fingers facing forward, but O'Bannon's redesign shifted the legs to the side. When the foam rubber sculpture of the facehugger was produced, O'Bannon asked that it should remain unpainted, believing the rubber, which resembled human skin, was more plausible.

There has been some debate about the sexual appearance of the facehugger, some saying it unmistakably resembles female genitalia.

In Aliens, the facehuggers were redesigned by Stan Winston so that they would be capable of movement. Unlike the creatures in the first film, the creatures would take a much more active role in impregnating their victims. When Ripley throws one off her, the facehugger is now capable of scuttling across the floor and leaping at its prey, wrapping its tail around the victim's throat. The facehugger is also shown to be capable of independently surviving outside of its egg. Due to the film's budget, only two fully working facehuggers were built.

In Alien 3, another addition was planned but ultimately dropped, a "super-facehugger" that would carry the embryo of the queen Alien. This super-facehugger is briefly glimpsed in the Assembly cut of Alien 3 but not identified as such. It made a brief appearance in the canonical Alien book called Alien: Sea of Sorrows, set after the events of Alien Resurrection, about the grandson of Ripley Clone 8, Ellen Ripley's clone.

in alien covenant there is a facehugger variant known as a praeto-facehugger which seeds a praetomorph

==== Chestburster ====
A chestburster emerging from Kane's chest in Alien

After impregnation, facehuggers die and the embryo's host wakes up afterward, showing no considerable outward negative symptoms and a degree of amnesia regarding events at the time of implantation, with Gilbert Kane only recalling "some horrible dream about smothering." Symptoms build acutely after detachment of the facehugger, the most common being sore throat, slight nausea, increased congestion, and moderate to extreme hunger. In later stages where the incubation period is extended in preparation of a queen birth, symptoms will include a shortness of breath, exhaustion, and hemorrhaging (detectable through biological scanners and present in nosebleeds or other seemingly random bleeding incidents), as well as chest pains caused by a lack of space due to the chestburster's presence or even premature attempts to escape the host.

The incubating embryo takes on some of the host's DNA or traits, such as bipedalism, quadrupedalism, possessing the mandibles of a Predator, and other structural changes that enable adaptation to its new environment. According to Weyland-Yutani medical scientists in Aliens: Colonial Marines, the chestburster will draw nutrients from the host's body in order to develop a placenta as it grows, attaching itself to several major organs in the process. The placenta has cancerous qualities, such that even if the embryo were removed surgically, the placenta would simply cause the affected organs to shut down, resulting in death; the only exceptions to this are from human-xenomorph hybrid hosts like the cloned Ripley 8, who survived an extraction procedure without issue.

Over the course of one to twenty-four hours--indeterminable in some cases, and sometimes up to a week, in the case of some queens--the embryo develops into a chestburster, at which point it emerges, violently and fatally ripping open the chest of the host.

There is no on-screen explanation of the reasons for the different incubation times. Fully-grown aliens may avoid harming species acting as hosts for un-emerged chestbursters, though this may only be in the case of a queen embryo, as depicted in Alien 3.

When a chestburster erupts from the body of a human host, it is less than 30 centimetres (12 in) tall, although the embryo can vary in size from a guinea pig to a large dog depending on the size and species of the host. Its appearance and adaptive characteristics are also determined by the host. Typically, its first instinct upon emerging is to flee and hide until full maturation, as well as find a source of nutrition. However, it soon undergoes a dramatic growth spurt, reaching adult size in a matter of hours; in Alien, the chestburster had grown to 2 metres (6.6 ft) in height by the time the Nostromo crew located it again. (Note: In Aliens, Ripley claims that the creature killed the entire crew in 24 hours, so the growth stage must be under one day) The chestburster is shown to have molted before reaching maturity. In Aliens vs. Predator: Requiem, Alien warriors who are still growing are shown, displaying shed skin. In the unrated cut, the Predalien is shown wiping off its final molted skin at the film's start.

The chestburster was designed by Alien director Ridley Scott and constructed by special effects artist Roger Dicken. Giger had produced a model of a chestburster that resembled a "degenerate plucked turkey" and was far too large to fit inside a ribcage. Much to Giger's dismay, his model reduced the production team to fits of laughter on sight. Scott drafted a series of alternative designs for the chestburster based on the philosophy of working "back [from the adult] to the child" and ultimately produced "something phallic". The chestburster in the original Alien was armless, but arms were added in Aliens to facilitate the creature crawling its way out of its host's corpse. This concept would be abandoned in Alien Resurrection, but it would return in Alien: Covenant.

==== Cocoon ====
The xenomorph lifecycle is expanded in the movie Alien: Romulus with the introduction of a "cocoon" stage, which bridges the gap between the chestburster and the fully-grown adult xenomorph stages as witnessed by the characters Bjorn and Kay while aboard the derelict Renaissance space station. It is shown that a chestburster which had emerged from their crew-mate Navarro had attached itself to a wall and electrical cables building a biomechanical protective cocoon around itself after shedding its skin. While inside the cocoon, the chestburster transformed into a fully-grown adult drone xenomorph.

==== Soldiers ====
Also known as xenomorphs warriors, soldiers get from 7-8 ft tall and have all the same features as a standard xenomorph drones, some differences between them and drones are they have a ridged head and elbow spurs on their arms (with the exception of the soldiers from Aliens vs. Predator: Requiem). they are the stage right after drone and usually are found with other soldiers.

They made their first debut in Aliens and its been in ongoing debate whether or not there the same thing as xenomorphs drones but with recent sources like the Alien: The Roleplaying Game and Aliens: Fireteam Elite using the term it seems like they are no longer one and the same with xenomorph drones.

The behind the scenes reason for their ridged skulls was because the domes kept breaking during action sequences and James Cameron thought it looked cooler. The suits were designed by Stan Winston in aliens and ADI designed the suits in Aliens vs. Predator: requiem.

=== Alternative forms ===
Aliens take on various forms depending on the characteristics of their hosts. Most of the Aliens seen to date have been human-spawned, but a number of Aliens born from other hosts have also been seen. Some of these are also a different variants or species altogether such as the Neomorph, Praetomorph, and Deacon.

==== "Dragon" ====
The "Dog Alien" or "Ox Alien", (also known as "Runner Alien" in the expanded universe stories) and referred to in-film as "Dragon", was introduced in Alien 3. The creature itself shares the same basic physical configuration and instincts as the other Aliens shown in the previous films, although there are several differences due to the host from which it was spawned (a dog in the theatrical cut, or as an ox in the novelized version and the assembly cut). The dog Alien in its chestburster form is a miniature version of the adult, unlike the larval human- and Predator-spawned chestbursters. The adult is primarily quadrupedal, has digitigrade hind legs, and lacks the dorsal tubes of the human-spawned variety. The only differences behavior-wise was that this Alien behaved more like a dog or another quadrupedal animal that generally is prone to using its mouth instead of its front legs as its primary weapon to attack and maul its victims with its teeth. This Alien, even when actively provoked, would not attack or kill Ripley, due to the queen growing inside her. This, however, changed towards the movie's climax, at which point the monster, after surviving a torrent of molten lead, burst from the liquid and went into a rampage, pursuing Ripley and presumably attempting to kill her until she destroyed it by showering it with freezing water, causing it to explode from thermal shock.

Originally, H. R. Giger was approached on July 28, 1990, by David Fincher and Tim Zinnemann, and was asked to redesign his own creations for Alien 3. Giger's new designs included an aquatic face-hugger and a four-legged version of the adult Alien. As Giger said in an interview, "I had special ideas to make it more interesting. I designed a new creature, which was much more elegant and beastly, compared to my original. It was a four-legged Alien, more like a lethal feline—a panther or something. It had a kind of skin that was built up from other creatures—much like a symbiosis." However, when Tom Woodruff and Alec Gillis of Amalgamated Dynamics told Giger that they had their own design, Giger expressed himself as "very upset" and that the creature he had especially designed was his "baby". Even after the production severed contact, Giger continued to fax suggestions to Fincher and made full-scale drawings and a sculpt of the Alien, all of which were rejected.

"David Fincher neglected to inform me that Woodruff and Gillis were also contracted to take care of the redesign of the Alien—I found out much later... I thought I had the job and that Woodruff and Gillis would work from my plans. On their side, they were convinced that it was their job and accepted my 'suggestions' with pleasure. They believed that all my effort was based on a huge love for the matter, because I worked hard even after my contract was over."

Giger would later be angered by the end credits of the released film presenting him as merely the creator of the original creature, and the fact that Amalgamated Dynamics personnel gave a series of interviews that minimized Giger's contribution. Fox eventually reimbursed Giger, but only after he refused to be interviewed for their behind-the-scenes documentary of Alien 3.

However, Giger would comment that he thought the resulting film was "okay" and that the Alien was "better than in the second film".

==== Newborn ====
The "Newborn", seen here with Ripley in Alien Resurrection

In Alien Resurrection, due to significant genetic tampering in an attempt to recover DNA from the deceased Ellen Ripley and the Alien queen within her, the resulting cloned Aliens show a number of minor human traits. The cloned queen inherits a perversion of a human womb, and as a result, it ceases to lay eggs and gives birth to a humanoid mutant hybrid. Physically, the human/Alien Newborn is very different from other alien young, being larger, with pale, translucent skin, a skull-shaped face with eyes, a human tongue, and a complete absence of a tail. The Newborn fails to bond with its Alien queen mother, killing it, and imprinting on the Ripley clone instead.

The Newborn creature was originally scripted by Joss Whedon as being an eyeless, ivory-white quadruped with red veins running along the sides of its head. It had an inner jaw, with the addition of a pair of pincers on the sides of its head. These pincers would have been used to immobilize its prey as it drained it of blood through the inner jaw. The creature was originally going to rival the queen in size, but Jean-Pierre Jeunet asked ADI to make the human/Alien hybrid, known as the Newborn, more human than Alien. The Newborn's eyes and nose were added to improve its expressions to make it a character, rather than just a "killing machine", and give it depth as a human-like creature.

==== Predalien ====
This variation is the result of a facehugger impregnating a Predator. The "Predalien" was first depicted in a painting by Dave Dorman, and subsequently featured in the Aliens versus Predator comics and games. A Predalien chestburster debuted in the final scene of Alien vs. Predator (2004), but did not make a full on film appearance as an adult until Aliens vs. Predator: Requiem (2007).

The Predalien shares many characteristics with its hosts, such as long hair-like appendages, mandibles, skin color, blood that glows in the dark (though still acidic), and similar vocalizations. It is a large, bulky creature, and possesses physical strength greater than that of human-spawned Aliens. Like human-born Aliens, it is also shown to be stronger than its host species, as evidenced by its ability to pin, push, and knock a Predator away with ease.

==== Deacon ====
The dark-blue Deacon is a different species that makes an appearance in Prometheus, though it clearly shares traits similar to the xenomorph, including a similar life-cycle. The Deacon is the result of a "Trilobite" (which takes its name from a group of extinct marine arthropods), a large facehugger-like creature, attacking and impregnating an Engineer. After some time spent gestating, it will burst out of its host, with the notable difference that it is "born" almost fully developed. The Deacon's emergence drew inspiration from the birth of foals, with the iridescent appearance for its skin being based on the equine placenta, and the protruding jaw inspired by the goblin shark.

Its fate is unknown, though the tie-in comic book Prometheus: Fire and Stone, also set on LV-223, features a mutated mountain with acidic veins which are implied to be the heavily mutated Deacon's deadly back spines.

==== Neomorph ====
The pale-white Neomorph features in Alien: Covenant. It was created through exposure to spores found growing on the Engineer colony world. The embryonic Neomorph gestates inside the host until it bursts out from whatever location in said host they've metastasized (one is seen gaining entry through the ear and emerging from the spine, while a second one, nasally inhaled, later erupts from the host's throat; other means of entry and egress are not made clear), using mostly its head, which is sharp and pointed, not unlike the Deacon. Similarly, the Deacon and Neomorph share the same type of pharyngeal jaw (similar to that of a moray eel) among other distinctly less biomechanical traits than the traditional xenomorph, though the latter does share with the Neomorph a tail strong enough to cause grievous injury: at one point, a violently thrashing Neomorph tail is seen to instantly remove a human jaw. This behavior is just one of several demonstrating the Neomorph's far more feral nature; they are voracious predators, often eating the corpses of their victims, and have not been seen sharing their xenomorph cousins' hive structure.

==== Offspring ====
The Offspring, featured in Alien: Romulus, is the result of pregnant character Kay injecting a serum derived from the Xenomorph's genome into her neck, leading to a rapid mutation of her unborn fetus. The creature is violently birthed in an egg, hatches, and rapidly grows to over 8 feet tall. It possesses fleshy skin, black eyes, a tail, a Xenomorph-like tongue with teeth, dorsal tubes, and overall facial similarities to the Engineers. It terrorizes the remaining crew of the Corbelan, damaging the android Andy and fatally feeding off of its mother Kay before pursuing Rain, but is finally defeated by her jettisoning it into the planetary rings below. Although there is no evidence that the Offspring possesses higher thinking, it smiles when in an advantageous position.

The Offspring was portrayed by basketball player Robert Bobroczkyi wearing full body prosthetic makeup created by Legacy Effects, with the exception of the creature's tail, which was CGI. Along with adding Xenomorph elements to a human, the design tried to invoke the Engineers that created the race.

==== Praetomorph ====
Praetomorphs are sometimes called protomorphs. Featured in Alien: Covenant, they were created by David 8 using chemical A0-3959X.91–15 and the remains of Elizabeth Shaw. They use facehuggers that implant a substance which turns into an imp. An imp is the chestburster stage of a praetomorph. Imps look like miniature fully formed praetomorphs, but missing the dorsal tubes and with a pale coloration. Adult praetomorphs are dubbed stalkers; they are similar to xenomorphs in appearance though they are missing the biomechanical elements. They tend to be black in color, and they have an inner jaw just like standard xenomorphs. Also like xenomorphs, they have acid blood which can melt through metal quickly. They are nowhere near as intelligent as xenomorphs, and are feral compared to their cousins.

== Critical response ==
Film historian Thomas Doherty described the Alien movies as exploring "not only the impact of extraterrestrial parasites on human digestion but the frontiers of genre and gender in Hollywood narrative." Doherty dubbed the xenomorph "a cross-dressing monster from the id whose sexual confusion mirrors the shifting gender dynamics of the series." He noted how its first three iterations–facehugger, chestburster, and dragon–"suggest the outline of the masculine member," yet Aliens makes it a female–"a queen generating unholy spawn"–and in Aliens 3, "she reverts again to a he, pursuing the female to penetrate and impregnate her."

Author Amanda DiGioia argued "the vagina dentata is an evolutionary fear that has been learned, due to the prevalence of the notion of the vagina dentata in societies around the globe." DiGioia also argued that "[c]onceptually, a vagina dentata plays on male fears of vaginas, wombs, mothers and childbirth, and has been represented in various media from ancient times…The vagina dentata, for males, can also represent the fear of entry to the unknown, of the dark dangers that must be controlled and stamped out in women…Woman in possession of destructive or deadly genitalia are threats that must be neutraised: the dangerous teeth must be pulled out to make her a compliant, procreative partner, or the woman must be killed."

Film professor Barbara Creed called the xenomorphs an example of the "archaic mother." In Alien, Creed notes that while "the archaic mother, the creature who laid the eggs," is never seen, her presence is signalled in "the text's various representations of the primal scene and in its depiction of birth and death…in the film's images of blood, darkness and death [and] in the chameleon figure of the alien, the monster as fetish-object of and for the archaic mother." Creed also argued that the xenomorph's phallic appearance was deliberate, in order to cover its vagina dentata.

== See also ==
- Giger Bars, two xenomorph-themed bars in Switzerland
