= Dark Star: H. R. Giger's World =

- Film poster
- Dark Star: H. R. Gigers Welt
- Directed by: Belinda Sallin
- Produced by: Marcel Hoehn
- Cinematography: Eric Stitzel
- Edited by: Birgit Munsch
- Music by: Peter Scherer
- Production companies: T&C Film
- Distributed by: Icarus Films
- Release date: September 27, 2014 (ZFF)
- Running time: 95 minutes
- Country: Switzerland
- Languages: English; German
- Box office: $61,000 (US)

Dark Star: H. R. Giger's World (German: Dark Star: H. R. Gigers Welt) is a 2014 Swiss documentary directed by Belinda Sallin about surrealist H. R. Giger. Giger's friends, family, and fans describe the impact he and his art have had on their lives, and Giger discusses some of his early inspirations. It was shot in 2013 and 2014, and Giger died shortly after production ended.

== Interviews ==
- H. R. Giger
- Carmen Maria Giger, his wife
- Carmen Scheifele de Vega, his mother-in-law
- Stanislav Grof, psychiatrist
- Thomas Gabriel Fischer, heavy metal musician and assistant
- Paul Tobler, brother of model Li Tobler
- Sandra Beretta, ex-girlfriend
- Mia Bonzanigo, ex-wife
- Marco Witzig, Giger's assistant and archivist
- Andreas J. Hirsch, curator
- Hans H. Kunz
- Leslie Barany

== Production ==
Sallin came up with the idea of a documentary on Giger after befriending an ex-girlfriend of his. The documentary was always meant to be nontraditional; more traditional biographies, which cover his career and art during his prime, are widely and easily available. Instead, Sallin wanted to focus on Giger's current life and relationships. Sallin came up with the title after meeting with Giger and seeing that he rarely left his home, where he was the center of attention. She was further inspired by the 1970s science fiction film Dark Star, written by Dan O'Bannon, one of Giger's collaborators on Alien. The description "dark" is a play on Giger's personality. Sallin expected him to be dark and was surprised to find him polite and friendly. Although worried that a feature-length documentary would be difficult because of Giger's ill health and disinterest in discussing his art, she convinced Giger it would be a good idea; he had at first suggested that others may be more deserving. Sallin credited her acceptance of Giger's dislike of discussing his work in interviews as a reason why he was open to filming. Production took place in 2013 and 2014. Shortly after production ended, Giger died. Sallin said that it was emotionally difficult to complete post-production after Giger's death, but they had all the material they needed. One advantage of Giger's reluctance to speak was that his interviews needed very little editing. Many of the archival interviews are from Fredi M. Murer's documentaries in the early 1970s. Sallin received outtakes from Murer, some of which had never been seen publicly before.

== Release ==
Dark Star premiered in September at the 2014 Zurich Film Festival and had a limited release in the U.S. in May 2015.

== Reception ==
Rotten Tomatoes, a review aggregator, reports that 63% of 35 surveyed critics gave the film a positive review; the average rating is 6.3/10. Metacritic rated it 62/100 based on 13 reviews. John DeFore of The Hollywood Reporter wrote that it "feels like it was made by a friend, in a good way". Jeannette Catsoulis of The New York Times called it a disordered and free-form documentary that is "carefully curated to flatter". Walter Addiego of the San Francisco Chronicle rated it 2/4 stars and wrote that it is uninteresting to non-fans. Alan Scherstuhl of The Village Voice wrote that the film does not shy away from the controversy that surrounds Giger's art and "is fascinating, even if you're resistant to this dark star's gravity".
