= Biomech =

Biomech may refer to:

- Biomechanics, the study of the mechanical function of biological systems
- Biomechanical art, the style of H. R. Giger and tattoo
- Ocean Machine: Biomech, a 1997 album by Canadian musician Devin Townsend
