= LED tattoo =

Theoretical body modification

A light-emitting diode tattoo is a theoretical body modification created by implanting very small electronic devices into outer layers of the skin, made with silicon-silk materials and miniature lights known as light-emitting diodes (LEDs). The concept is similar to a tattoo because tattoos are made by injecting tattoo ink into skin. While there is potential for many applications in the medical, commercial and personal domains, the technology is still in the development stage.

== Technological limitations ==
Current medical devices are limited by their isolation from the body and their placement on rigid silicon. Current devices also contain gold and titanium which are required for electrical connections. Both gold and titanium are bio-compatible which means that they will not be rejected by the body as a foreign substance. However, biocompatibility is not as preferable as biodegradable because the latter does not leave behind any unnecessary materials; so researchers are working on biodegradable contacts to eliminate all remnants but the silicon. The current form of the LED tattoo has been implanted on mice without harm. Research on silicon-silk technology has been conducted at the University of Pennsylvania's Engineering Department. The Royal Philips Electronics of the Netherlands showed commercial interest in the research of silicon silk technology, specifically LED tattoos as a means to extend the digital experience, or interactivity with the digital product.

== Development ==
Future LED tattoos may use silicon chips that are around the length of a small grain of rice which has the dimensions of about 1 millimeters and just 250 nanometers thick. The chips are placed on thin films of silk, which cause the electronics to conform to biological tissue. This process is aided when saline solution is added, helping the silicon mold to the shape of the skin. Silk dissolves away over time, which can occur immediately after the operation or over the course of several years, leaving the thin silicon circuits in place. While silicon has not been proven to be biocompatible all studies show it to be safe and it has been used in many other medical implant operations including implantation of silicon chips in mice.

One potential medical application would be silk-silicon LEDs to create photonic tattoos which would assist in blood-sugar readings.

== See also ==
- Biomechanical art
- OLED
