= Harkonnen Chair =

Series of H. R. Giger's furniture designs

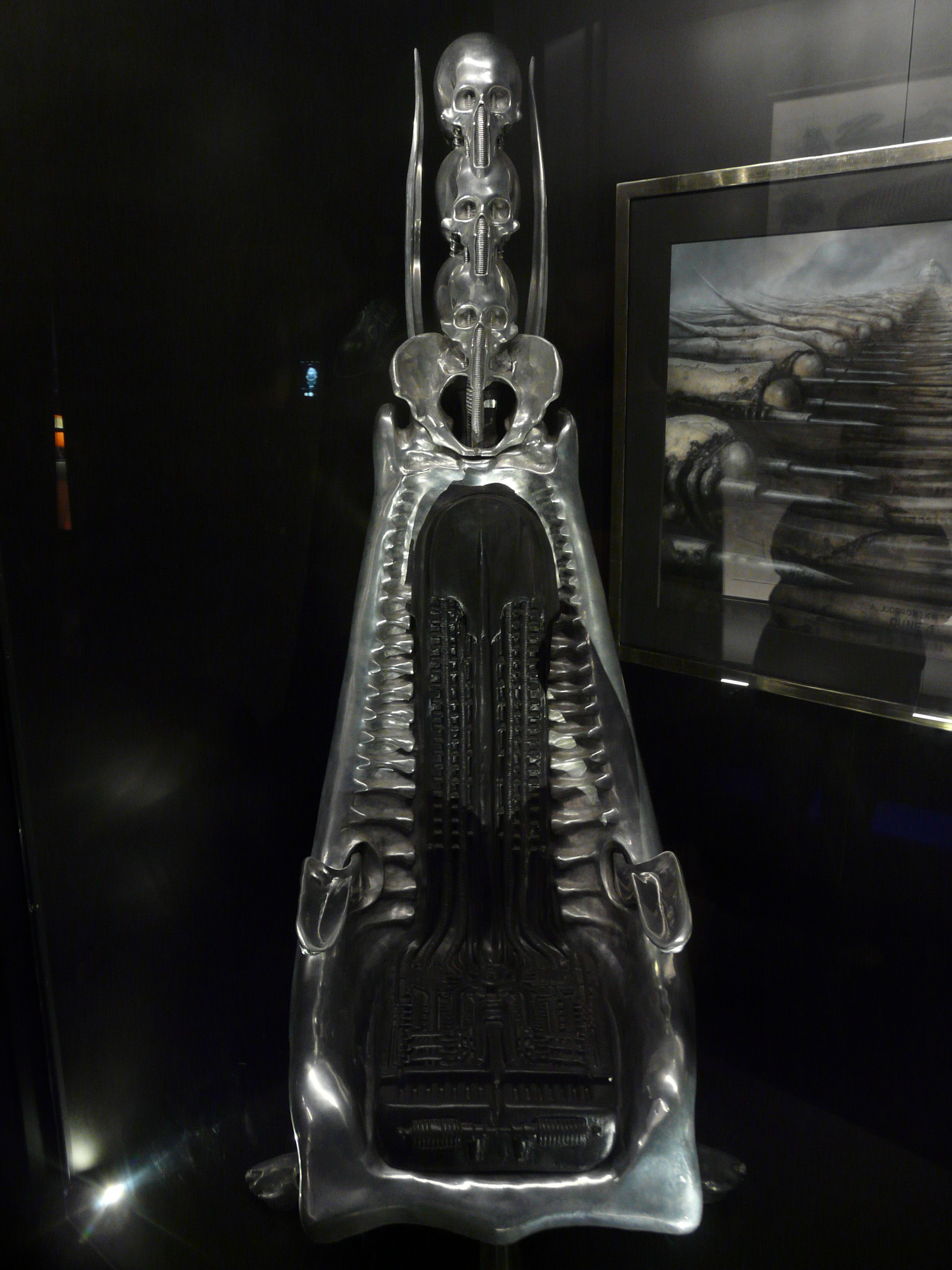
A Harkonnen "Capo" Chair on display at the Barbican Centre's Into the Unknown exhibit

The Harkonnen Chairs are a series of H. R. Giger's furniture designs. They were manufactured by hand chiefly out of aluminium or black fiberglass and made to resemble a human skeleton. The chairs were initially designed for an unproduced movie version of the 1965 Frank Herbert science fiction novel Dune that was to be directed by Alejandro Jodorowsky in the 1970s. Baron Harkonnen is one of the primary antagonists in Herbert's novel.

The series consisted of a regular chair and a more elaborate "Capo" chair intended to be used as Baron Harkonnen's main chair. The most prominent feature of the Capo Chair is a crown of three noseless skulls stacked on top of each other in a column above the back of the chair. This feature distinguishes the Capo Chair from regular Harkonnen Chairs, which lack the triple skull crown and armrests. Giger sold replicas for $30,000 (fiberglass) to $50,000 (aluminium).

Versions of the regular Harkonnen Chairs are in use at the two Swiss Giger Bar locations.

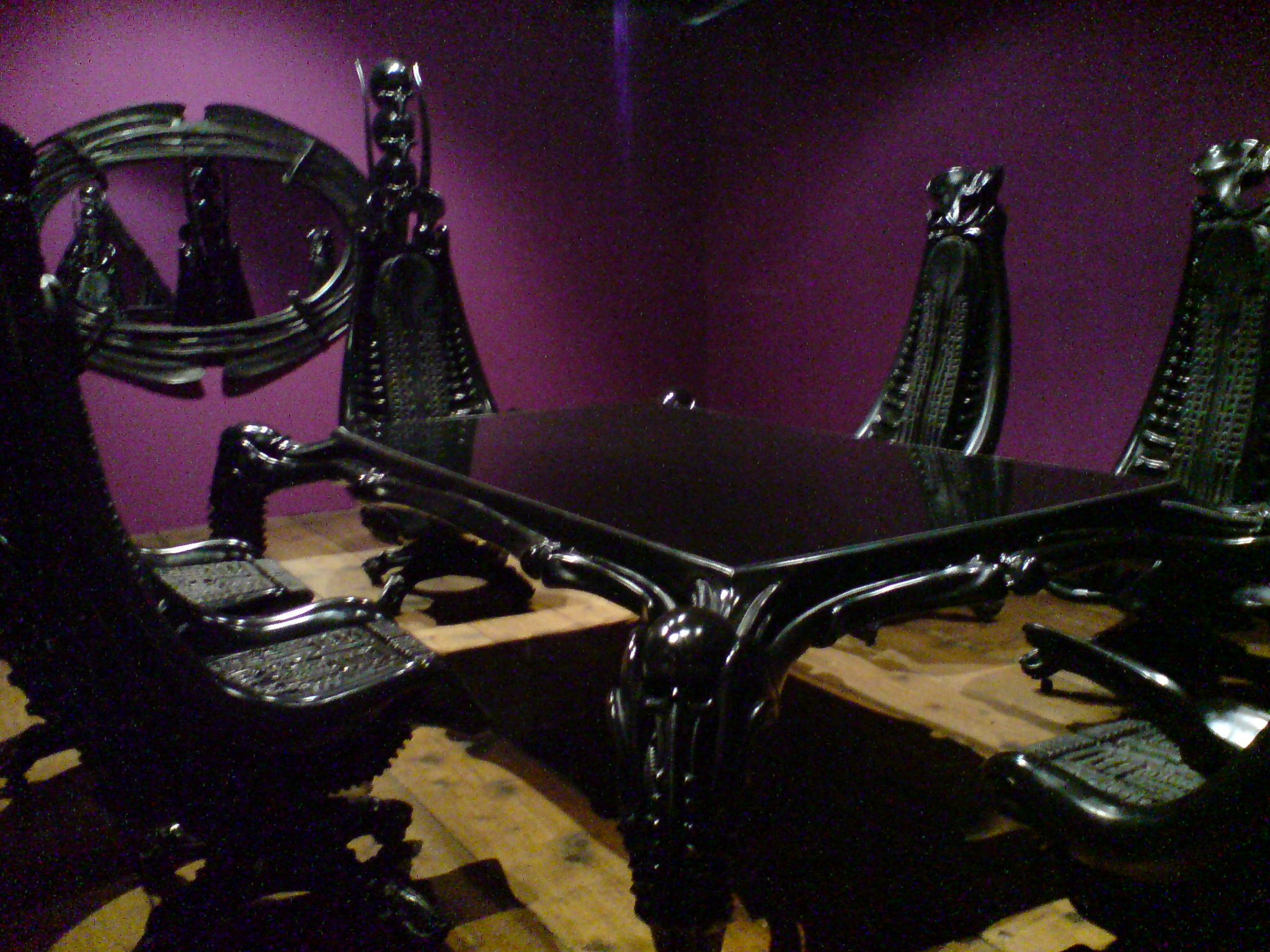
A complete set of chairs showing both the regular and "Capo" versions

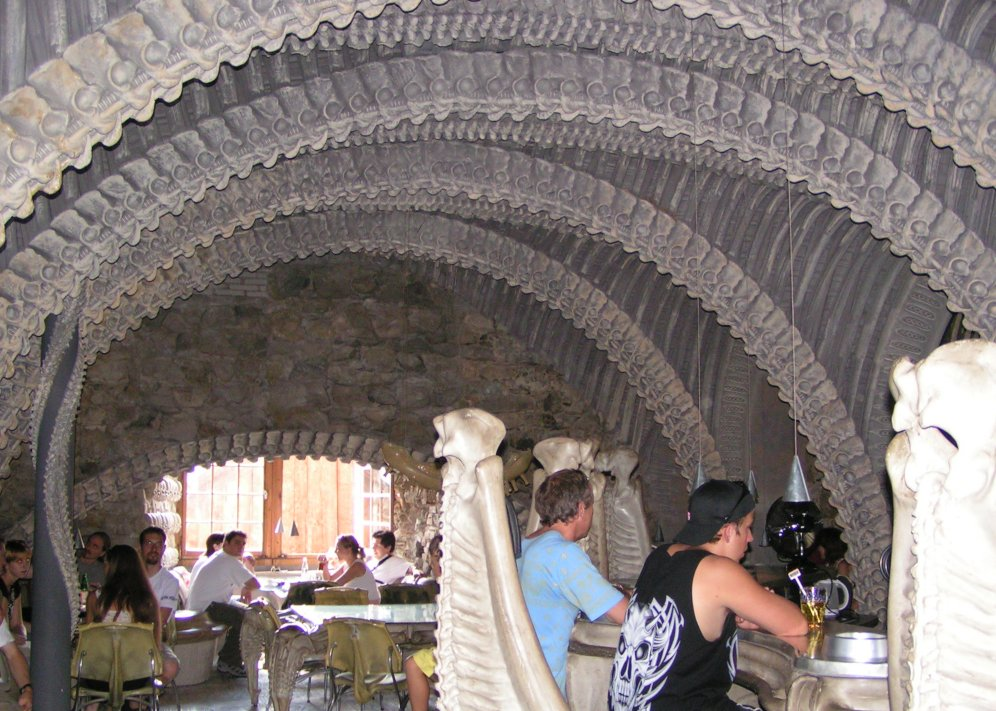
Harkonnen Chairs are used in Giger Bar in Gruyères.
