= H. R. Giger =

Swiss artist (1940–2014)

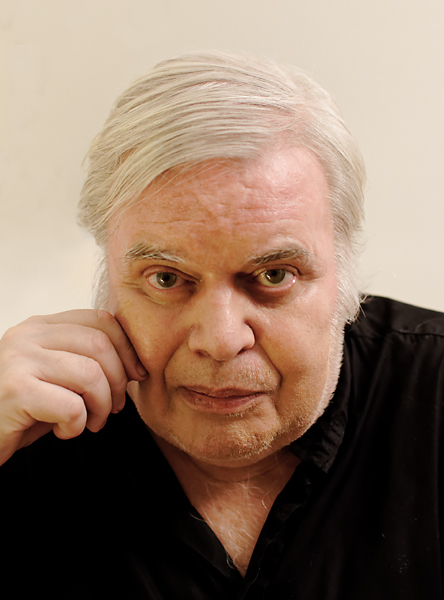
- Giger in 2012
- Born: Hans Ruedi Giger; 5 February 1940; Chur, Graubünden, Switzerland
- Died: 12 May 2014 (aged 74); Zürich, Switzerland
- Occupations: Painter, sculptor, set designer, film director
- Style: Biomechanical art, science fiction, horror, fantasy
- Spouses: Mia Bonzanigo (m. 1979; div. 1981) Carmen Maria Scheifele (m. 2006)
- Partner: Li Tobler (1966–1975)
- Website: hrgiger.com

Hans Ruedi Giger (/ˈɡiːɡər/ GHEE-gər; German: [ˈɡiːɡɐ]; 5 February 1940 – 12 May 2014) was a Swiss artist best known for his airbrushed images that blended human physiques with machines, an art style known as "biomechanical". He was part of the special effects team that won an Academy Award for the visual design of Ridley Scott's 1979 sci-fi horror film Alien, and was responsible for creating the xenomorph alien itself. His work is on permanent display at the H. R. Giger Museum in Gruyères, Switzerland. His style has been adapted to many forms of media, including album covers, furniture, and music videos.

== Early life ==
Giger was born in 1940 in Chur, the capital city of Graubünden, the largest and easternmost Swiss canton. His father, a pharmacist, viewed art as a "breadless profession" and strongly encouraged him to enter pharmacy. In 1962 he moved to Zürich, where he studied architecture and industrial design at the School of Applied Arts until 1970.

== Career ==
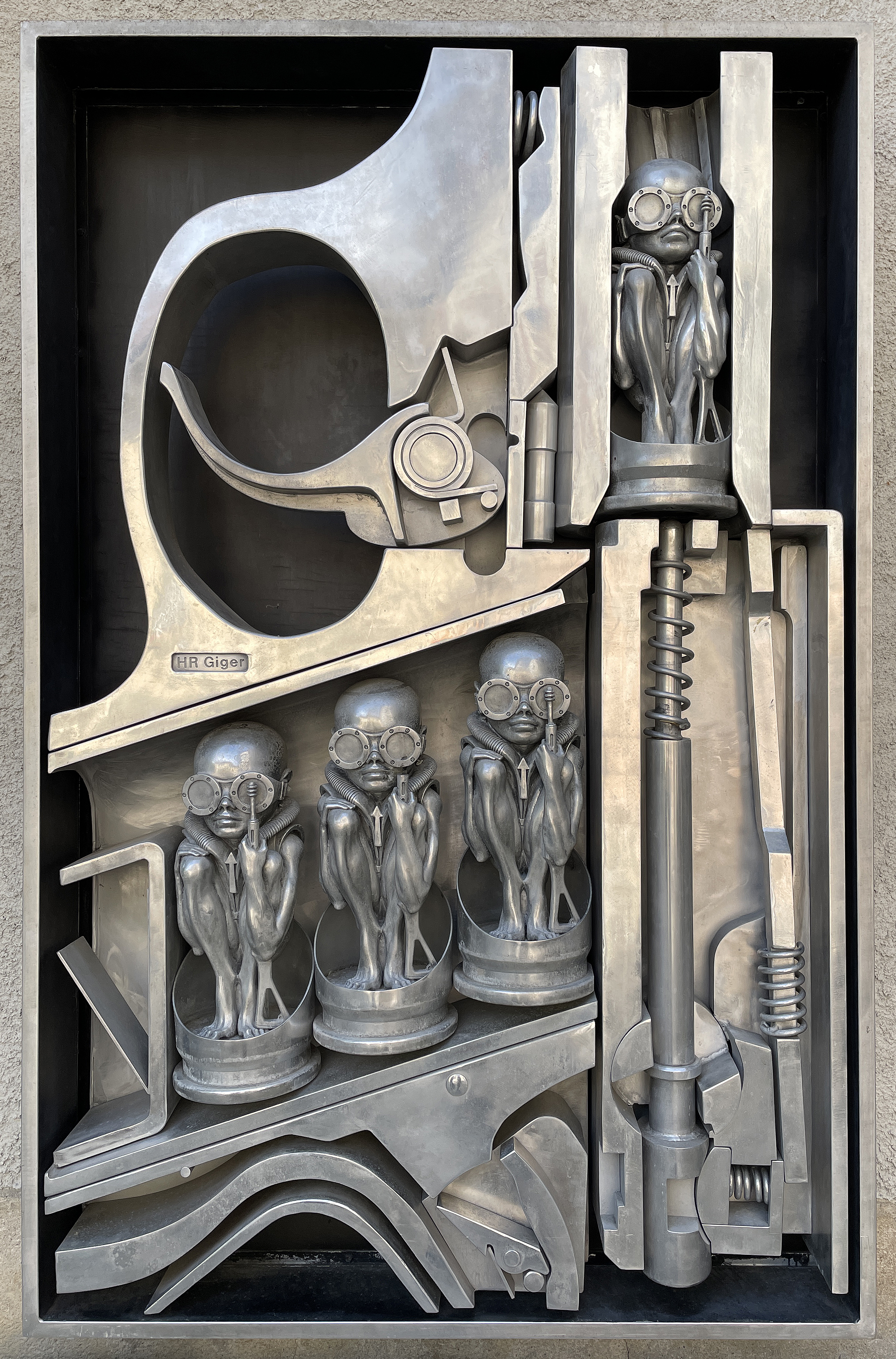
Birth Machine sculpture in Gruyères

Giger's first success occurred when H. H. Kunz, co-owner of Switzerland's first poster publishing company, printed and distributed Giger's first posters, beginning in 1969.

Giger's style and thematic execution were influential. He was part of the special effects team that won an Academy Award for Best Achievement in Visual Effects for their design work on the film Alien. His design for the Alien was inspired by his painting Necronom IV and earned him the Oscar in 1980. His books of paintings, particularly Necronomicon and Necronomicon II (1985) and the frequent appearance of his art in Omni magazine contributed to his rise to international prominence. Giger was admitted to the Science Fiction and Fantasy Hall of Fame in 2013. He is also well known for artwork on several music recording albums including Danzig III: How The Gods Kill by Danzig, Brain Salad Surgery by Emerson, Lake & Palmer, Attahk by Magma, Heartwork by Carcass, To Mega Therion by Celtic Frost, Eparistera Daimones and Melana Chasmata by Triptykon, Deborah Harry's KooKoo, Atomic Playboys by Steve Stevens, and Frankenchrist by the Dead Kennedys.

In 1998, Giger acquired the Saint-Germain Castle in Gruyères, Switzerland, which now houses the H.R. Giger Museum, a permanent repository of his work.

== Personal life ==
Giger had a relationship with Swiss actress Li Tobler until she died by suicide in 1975. Tobler's image appears in many of his paintings. He married Mia Bonzanigo in 1979; they divorced a year and a half later.

Giger lived and worked in Zürich with his second wife, Carmen Maria Scheifele Giger, who is the director of the H. R. Giger Museum.

On 12 May 2014, Giger died in a Zürich hospital after suffering injuries from a fall.

== Style ==
Giger started with small ink drawings before progressing to oil paintings. For most of his career, he worked predominantly in airbrush, creating monochromatic canvasses depicting surreal, nightmarish dreamscapes. He also worked with pastels, markers and ink.

Giger's most distinctive surrealist innovation was that of a representation of human bodies and machines in cold, interconnected relationships, which he described as "biomechanical". His main influences were painters Dado, Ernst Fuchs, and Salvador Dalí. He was introduced to Dali by painter Robert Venosa. Giger was also influenced by Polish sculptor Stanislaw Szukalski, and by painters Austin Osman Spare and Mati Klarwein, and was a personal friend of Timothy Leary. He studied interior and industrial design at the School of Commercial Art in Zurich from 1962 to 1965, and made his first paintings as art therapy.

== Other works ==
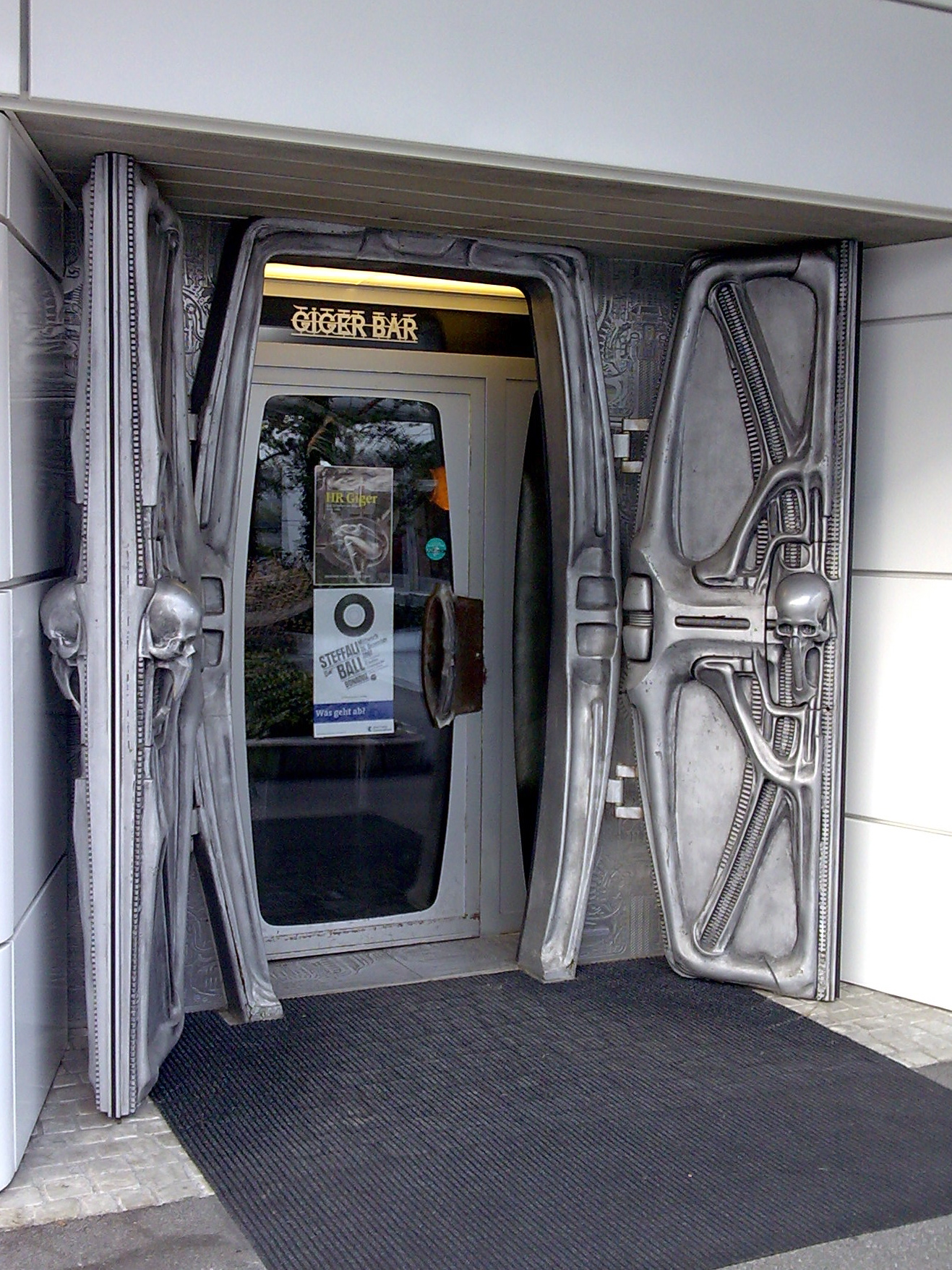
Entrance to Giger Bar in Chur

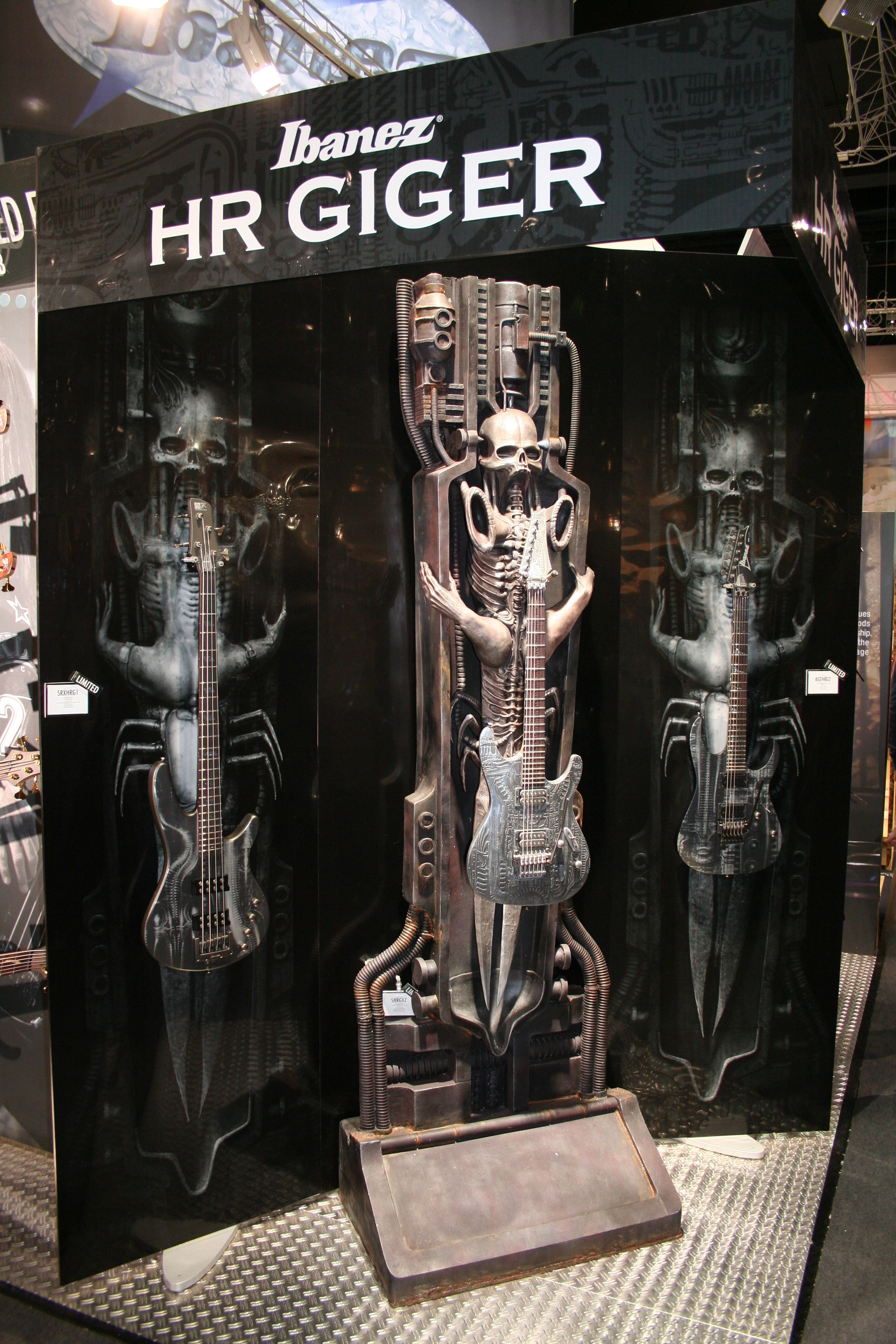
Ibanez H. R. Giger signature bass and guitars

Giger directed a number of films, including Swiss Made (1968), Tagtraum (1973), Giger's Necronomicon (1975).

Giger created furniture designs, particularly the Harkonnen Capo Chair for a film of the novel Dune that was to be directed by Alejandro Jodorowsky. Many years later, David Lynch directed the film, using only rough concepts by Giger. Giger had wished to work with Lynch, as he stated in one of his books that Lynch's film Eraserhead was closer than even Giger's own films to realizing his vision.

Giger also applied his biomechanical style to interior design. One "Giger Bar" appeared in Tokyo, but the realization of his designs was a great disappointment to him, since the Japanese organization behind the venture did not wait for his final designs, and instead used Giger's rough preliminary sketches. For that reason Giger disowned the Tokyo bar. The two Giger Bars in his native Switzerland, in Gruyères and Chur, were built under Giger's close supervision and they accurately reflect his original concepts. At The Limelight in Manhattan, Giger's artwork was licensed to decorate the VIP room, the uppermost chapel of the landmarked church, but it was never intended to be a permanent installation and bore no similarity to the bars in Switzerland. The arrangement was terminated after two years when the Limelight closed.

Giger's art has greatly influenced tattooists and fetishists worldwide. Under a licensing deal Ibanez guitars released an H. R. Giger signature series: the Ibanez ICHRG2, an Ibanez Iceman, features "NY City VI", the Ibanez RGTHRG1 has "NY City XI" printed on it, the S Series SHRG1Z has a metal-coated engraving of "Biomechanical Matrix" on it, and a 4-string SRX bass, SRXHRG1, has "N.Y. City X" on it.

=== Films ===
- Alien (designed, among other things, the Alien creature, "The Derelict" and the "Space Jockey")
- Aliens (credited for the creation of the creature only)
- Alien 3 (designed the dog-like Alien bodyshape, plus a number of unused concepts, many mentioned on the special features disc of Alien 3, despite not being credited in the theatrical version)
- Alien Resurrection (credited for the creation of the creature only)
- Alien vs. Predator (credited for the creation of the creature only)
- Aliens vs. Predator: Requiem (credited for the creation of the creature only)
- Poltergeist II: The Other Side
- Killer Condom (creative consultant, set design)
- Species (designed Sil, and the Ghost Train in a dream sequence)
- Species II (the film includes Eve, based on creature Sil from the first Species film)
- Future-Kill (designed artwork for the movie poster)
- Tokyo: The Last Megalopolis (creature designs)
- Prometheus (The 2012 film includes "The Derelict" spacecraft and the "Space Jockey" designs from the first Alien film, as well as a "Temple" design from the failed Jodorowsky Dune project and original extraterrestrial murals created exclusively for Prometheus, based in conceptual art from Alien. Unlike Alien Resurrection, the Prometheus film credited H. R. Giger with the original designs.)
- Alien: Covenant (the 2017 film includes the Alien creature, "The Derelict" spacecraft and the "Space Jockey" designs from the first Alien film. It also showcases the Proto Bloodburster / Neomorph in David's lab, which was designed but unused for Prometheus.)

=== Work for recording artists ===
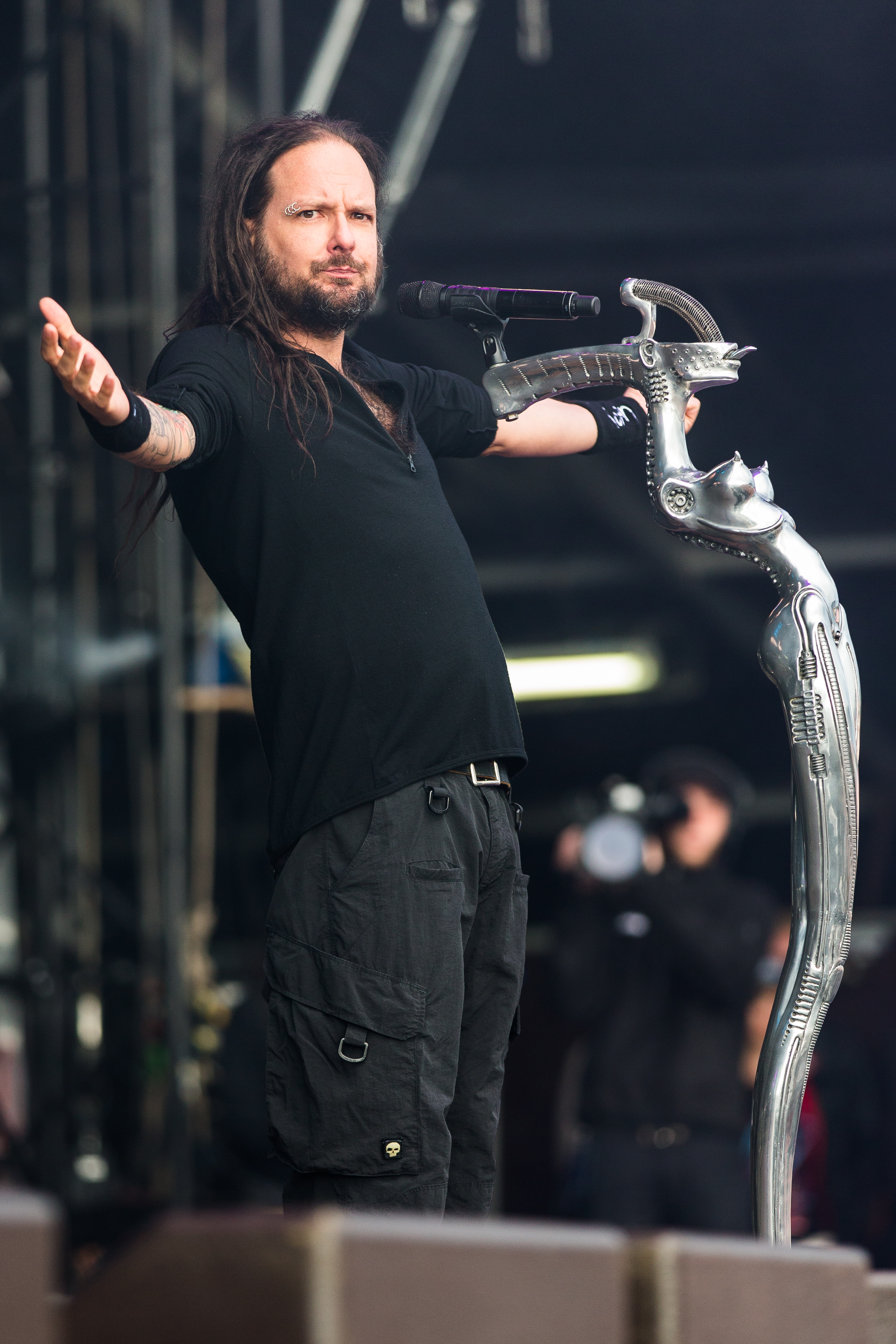
Jonathan Davis with his microphone stand

- Celtic Frost: To Mega Therion
- Magma: Attahk
- Emerson, Lake & Palmer: Brain Salad Surgery
- Floh de Cologne: Mumien
- Steve Stevens' Atomic Playboys
- Debbie Harry, portraits for KooKoo album cover and videos "Backfired" and "Now I Know You Know"
- hide: Hide Your Face
- Carcass: Heartwork
- Danzig: Danzig III: How the Gods Kill
- Dead Kennedys' album Frankenchrist, Poster insert of Landscape XX (which led to an obscenity trial)
- Atrocity – Hallucinations
- Korn's Jonathan Davis commissioned Giger to design and sculpt a microphone stand, with the requirement that it be biomechanical, erotic, and movable. The contract allowed for five aluminium microphone stands to be made. Davis had received three of the bio-mechanical microphone stands, and Giger kept the other two, one for permanent display at the H.R. Giger Museum and another for his gallery exhibitions. The design of the microphone stand was later adapted to Giger's Nubian Queen, transforming it into a fine art sculpture.
- Helped to design the first professional video clip of "Böhse Onkelz" called "Dunkler Ort" (dark location) from their album Ein böses Märchen ... aus tausend finsteren Nächten, which was released in 2000.
- Ibanez Guitars released a series of H. R. Giger Signature Models with artwork on the body.
- Triptykon: Eparistera Daimones
- Triptykon: Melana Chasmata

=== Interior decoration ===
- Giger Bars in Switzerland's Chur and Gruyères
- Maison d'Ailleurs (House of Elsewhere) in Yverdon-les-Bains

=== Video games ===
- Jaseiken Necromancer (1988), an early RPG for the PC Engine / Turbografx-16 developed by Hudson Soft, uses Giger's art as inspiration for its in-game visuals, as well as his painting The Spell III for its cover art.
- Dark Seed and its sequel, Dark Seed II, both adventure games for the Amiga, Macintosh, and PC, were developed by Cyberdreams and directly based on Giger's input.

== Recognition ==
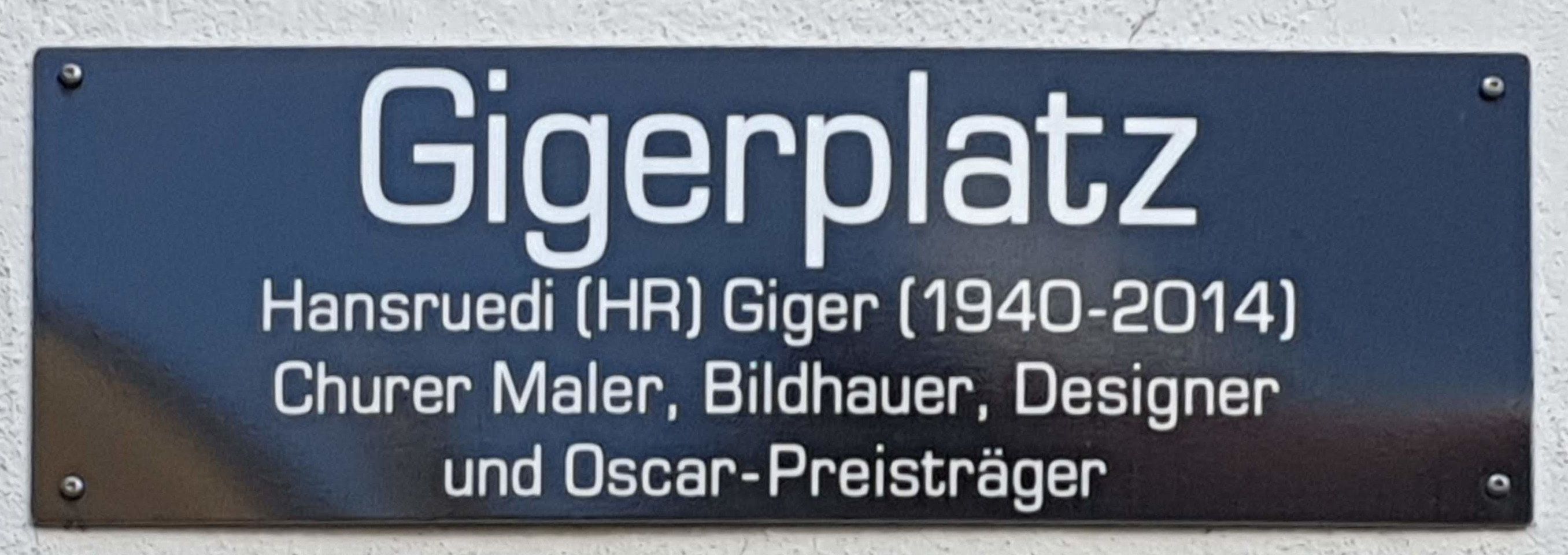
Street name sign in Chur, Switzerland

Giger was awarded the Inkpot Award in 1979.

In addition to his awards, Giger was recognized by a variety of festivals and institutions. On the one year anniversary of his death, the Museum of Arts and Design in New York City staged the series The Unseen Cinema of HR Giger in May 2015.

Since 2018, Neuchâtel International Fantastic Film Festival has presented the H.R. Giger Narcisse Award for Best Feature Film. The award trophy was designed by H.R. Giger. The image of the Narcisse award has become the festival’s logo.

Dark Star: H. R. Giger's World, a biographical documentary by Belinda Sallin, debuted 27 September 2014 in Zurich, Switzerland.

In July 2018, the asteroid 109712 Giger was named in his memory.
