= Li Tobler =

Swiss actress and model (1947–1975)

- Li Tobler with Voice of America figures (1968)
- Born: 30 November 1947; Switzerland
- Died: 19 May 1975 (aged 27); Zürich, Switzerland
- Occupations: Actress, model
- Partner: H. R. Giger

Li Tobler (30 November 1947 – 19 May 1975) was a Swiss stage actress and model for the artist H. R. Giger, two of whose major paintings were portraits of Tobler. Also, her face can be recognised in some of his semi-abstract subjects where man and machine are fused into one.

Tobler lived with Giger in squalor, often inside condemned buildings, eventually becoming romantically involved. Although their relationship was open, it remained deeply intense and creatively inspiring to Giger. Tobler suffered from emotional insecurity, heavy drug dependence and physical exhaustion from theatrical tours. She died by suicide at age 27 as a result of constant depression. According to Giger, she had wished her life to be "short and intense".

== Biography ==
=== Acting and early years with Giger: 1966–1971 ===
Not much is known of Li Tobler's early life. She was born in Switzerland in 1947. In 1966, at the age of eighteen, she met artist H. R. Giger while she was studying acting in K. Rellstab's drama studio in Zürich. According to Giger, she had "an enormous vitality and a great appetite for life" and wished her life to be "short and intense".

Meanwhile, following her graduation from K. Rellstab's drama school, Tobler started working in the Neumarkt. In 1969, she was chosen by the Stadtheater theatre of St. Gallen, a city almost 50 km from Zürich. During this period they could only meet up on weekends. Tobler remained a member of the Stadtheater stage for two seasons and in 1970 she returned to Zürich. Due to her ongoing financial problems, she was obliged to move in with a friend of hers, though Giger was also living in a flat nearby. However, a few months later, in April, a small inheritance left to Giger by an uncle of his allowed the couple to buy a house in the suburbs (specifically, in Oerlikon) and settle together again. Tobler went on to act for the Kellertheater in Baden canton Aargau.

There were reportedly tumultuous goings-on, involving promiscuity by both partners and frequent use of drugs. On one occasion, Tobler failed to appear at the house and Giger, terrified, started frantically looking for her on highways. Eventually, he received a phone call from Tobler, three days later, who informed him that she had to make a trip of extreme urgency (probably with another boyfriend of hers, as remarked by Giger years later). According to the painter, "as of that moment she did, more or less, what she wanted". Giger, who was although madly in love with her, suffered his own psychological problems and agony over his artwork. Giger later stated that he was cheered simply by the fact that Tobler had found another lover, as that would make her happy and also improve Giger and Tobler's life together. It has been acknowledged, however, that Giger also used to see other women, much as Li Tobler had parallel affairs during those years.

=== Depression and suicide: 1971–1975 ===
In 1971, Giger and Tobler visited director Fredi M. Murer in London. Murer filmed a TV documentary, entitled Passagen (1972), about Giger's work. The documentary also featured interviews by both Giger and Tobler. In the 1972–1973 season, Tobler gained a part in the play My Woman, My Leader and had to travel all around Switzerland. Physically and mentally exhausted after 130 performances of the play, weary after the hectic schedule that required extensive touring around the country, Tobler decided to take a leave of absence from the acting profession, as well as from her relationship with Giger. In 1974, she opted to leave him and move to San Francisco with her American boyfriend. However, 30 days later, she returned to Zürich, claiming to be disappointed in the United States (as well as incapable of adapting to the American lifestyle, according to Giger) and resuming her relationship with the painter.

Following this incident, Tobler started becoming heavily depressed. In sharp contrast to Giger, who was undergoing one of his most energetic artistic periods, Tobler was gradually dissolving in depression and apathy. Giger's energy only seemed to depress her more. She started contemplating suicide. One of her friends, Jörg Stummer, advised her to open her own gallery, as a means of becoming active again. Her gallery presented several modern artists, including works by Manon, Walter Pfeiffer and Jürgen Klauke. At her last exhibition, entitled Schuhwerke (German for Shoe Works), the guests were invited to appear wearing bizarre shoe creations. Giger filmed the guests while wearing a pair of "shoes" hollowed out of fresh loaves of bread. Despite Tobler's initial enthusiasm for her new project, after a short period of creative stir, she fell into a lethargic state and took her own life at the age of 27, on Whit Monday 1975 by shooting herself while in bed. She left a large note on the floor reading "Adieu", per the documentary Dark Star.

Giger was accused by some people of negatively influencing Tobler (who was regularly dealing with depression) with the bleakness and morbidity of his work. Nevertheless, Giger was devastated by Tobler's death and felt an emptiness in his life, which was reflected by the even darker tone his work assumed from that point onwards. In 1976, the event known as "The Second Celebration of the Four" was held, with Giger and his friends attending, in Ueli Steinle's Ugly Club in Richterswil. The event functioned simultaneously as the inauguration of the club and a memorial for Tobler. The event included the worshipping of the Four Elements and was claimed as being close to Satanist and Lovecraftian aesthetics.

== Tobler as a symbol in Giger's work ==
Several articles have been written on Tobler's function as a symbol and reflection in most of Giger's early professional works. Nevill Drury, who interviewed Giger in 1985 (Shadowzone # 5), said:

Li is the prototype for the many ethereal women in his paintings who peer forth from the torment of snakes, needles and stifling bone prisons – to a world beyond. Giger painted Li's body several times with an airbrush and there are several photographs of her posing naked – like a woman of mystery struggling to emerge from the nightmare that has possessed her soul.

Drury concludes his article by remarking:

It may be too simplistic to say that Tobler haunts Giger still, for his life is full of beautiful and exotic women who are fascinated by his art and by his bohemian lifestyle. But there is no doubting that the simultaneous agony and joy of life with Li Tobler established the dynamic of fear and transcendence which is present in many of his paintings.

Many of the female faces that can be seen in Giger's early work are based on Tobler's face. Arguably the most famous paintings depicting Tobler (and the only ones doing so explicitly) are two of Giger's most well-known and recognizable paintings, Li I and Li II, both 1974. Allegedly, Tobler was shocked when she first saw Li I, which was supposed to represent her, and proceeded to break the frame and tear its fabric. Giger consequently reconstructed the torn painting.
