= Giger Bar =

Bar themed and modelled by the Swiss artist H. R. Giger

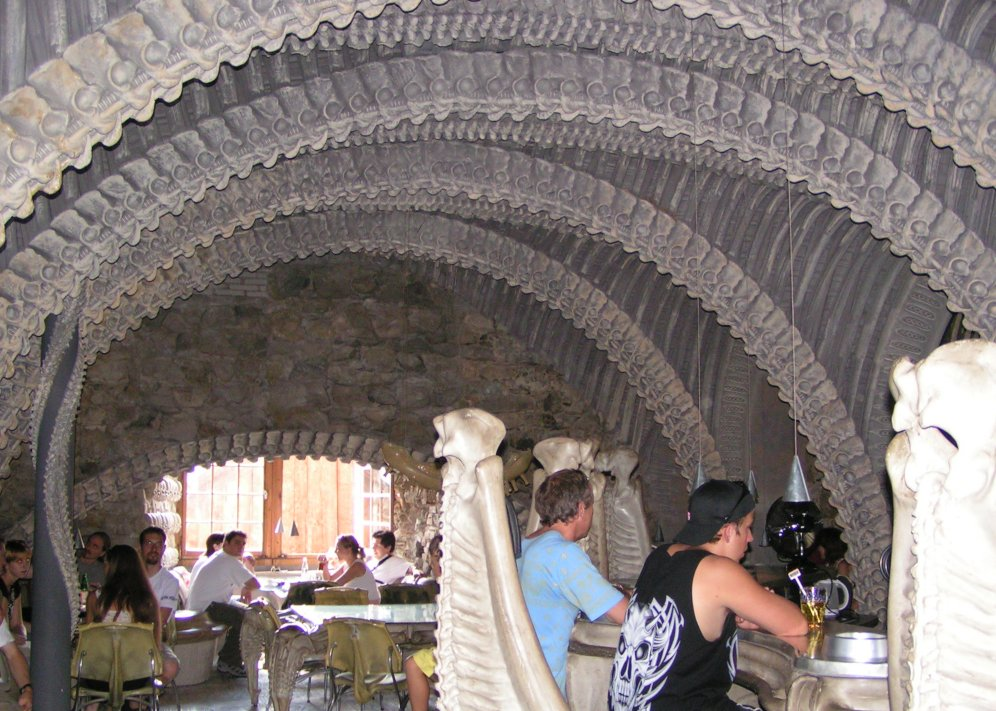
- Bar in Gruyères in 2005
- Interactive map of Giger Bar

Restaurant information
- Established: February 8, 1992
- Location: Comercialstrasse 23, Chur, Switzerland
- Coordinates: 46°50′58.182″N 9°30′37.2564″E
- Other locations: Château Saint-Germain, Gruyères, Switzerland
- Website: www.gigerbar.com/en

A Giger Bar is a bar themed and modelled by the late Swiss artist H. R. Giger. There are two Giger Bars in Switzerland: the first, the H.R. Giger Bar Kalchbühl in Chur (canton of Grisons), which opened in 1992, and the second is the Museum HR Giger Bar, located at the HR Giger Museum at Château St. Germain, Gruyères (canton of Fribourg), which opened on April 12, 2003.

In 2013, the founder of the Sci-Fi Hotel chain, Andy Davies, partnered with artist H. R. Giger to establish the Giger Bar brand in the United States as part of the company's development plans.

== Design ==
The interior of the bars are themed along the lines of his biomechanical style as shown in the Alien films. The roof, walls, fittings and chairs are all modelled by the artist and fit into the same designs as seen in the films he designed, notably "Alien". The prominent high-backed Harkonnen Chair design was originally intended as a Harkonnen throne for an abandoned Dune film project.

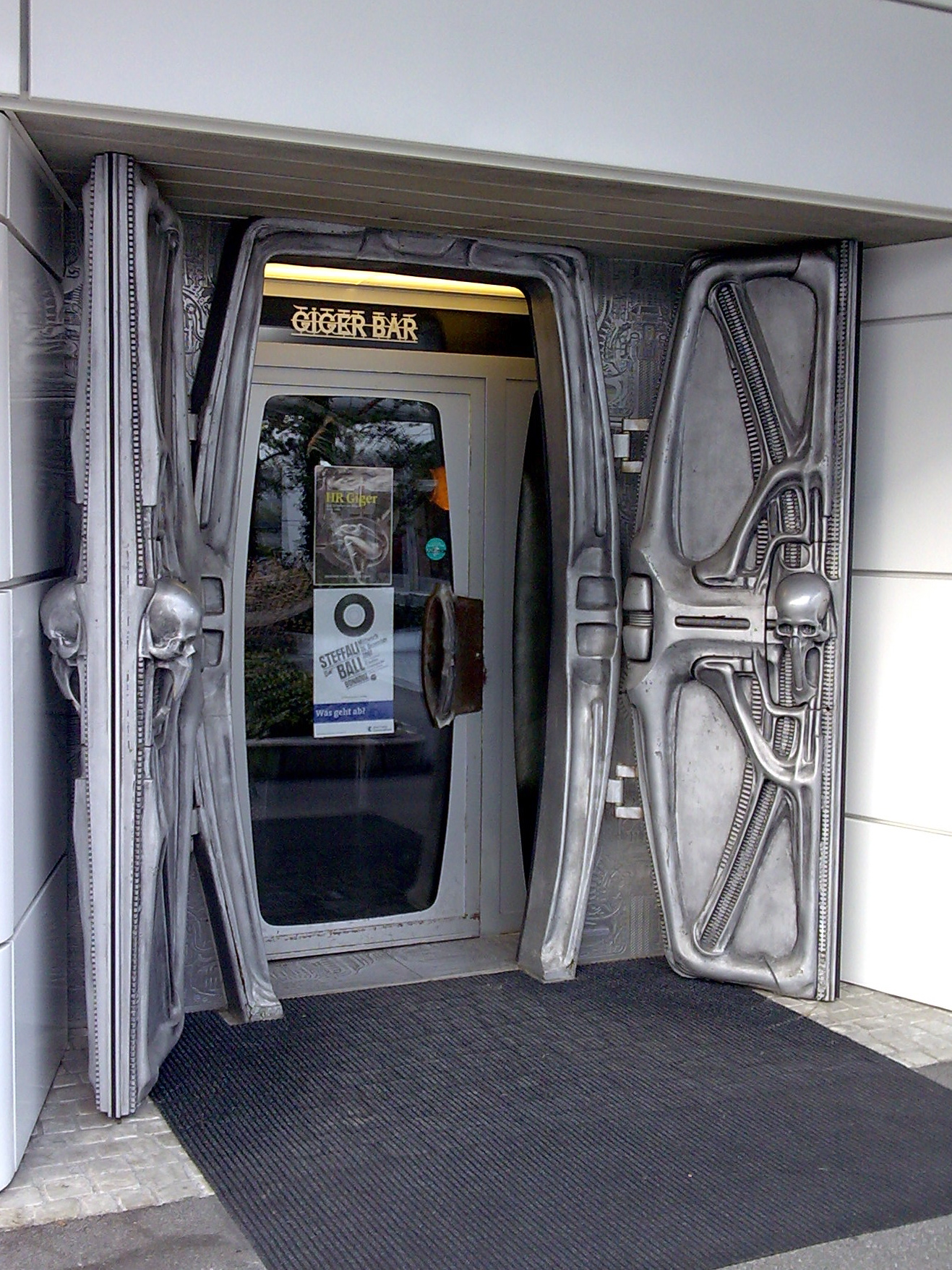
Entrance to Giger Bar in Chur

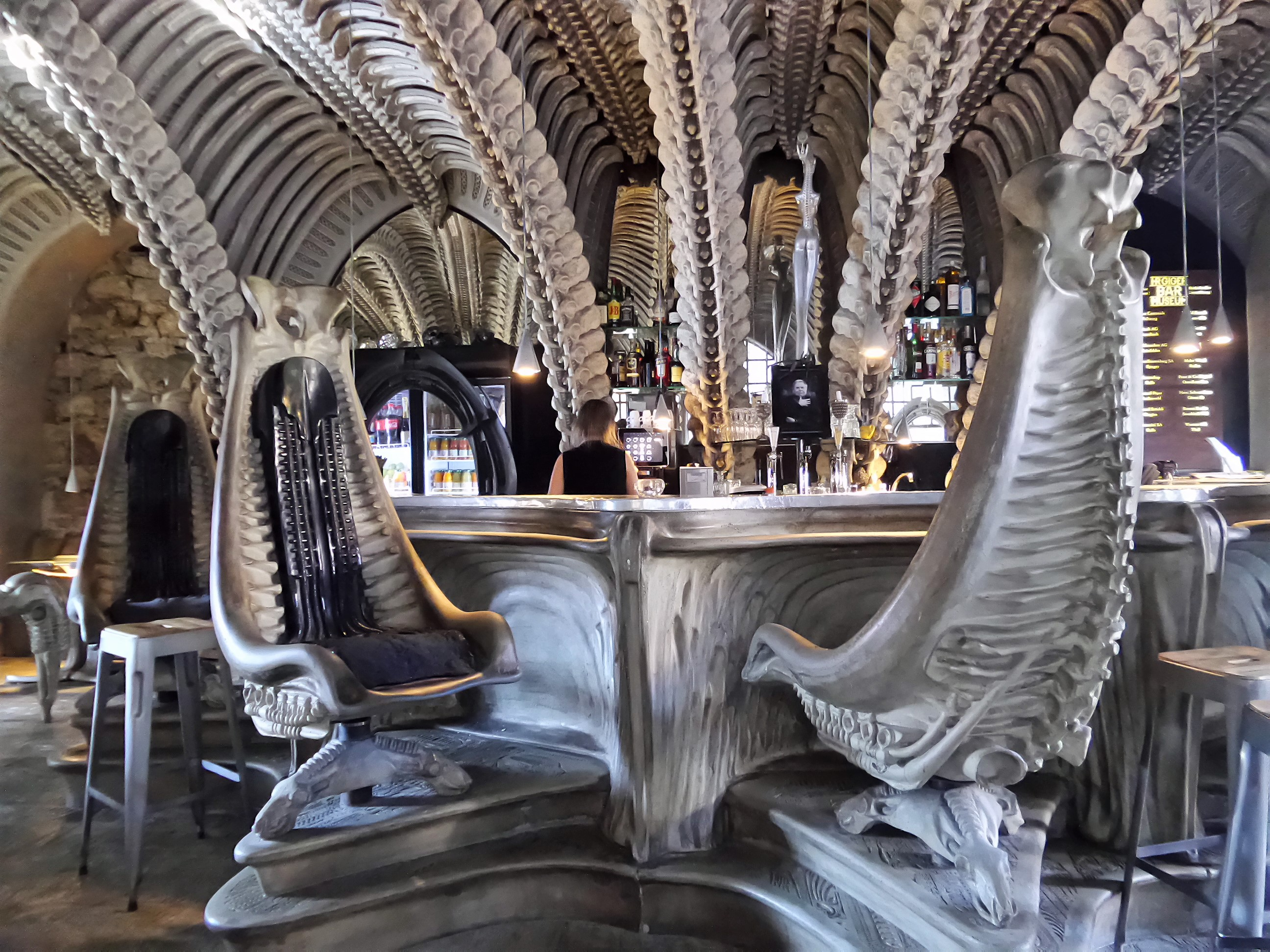
HR Giger Museum Bar interior

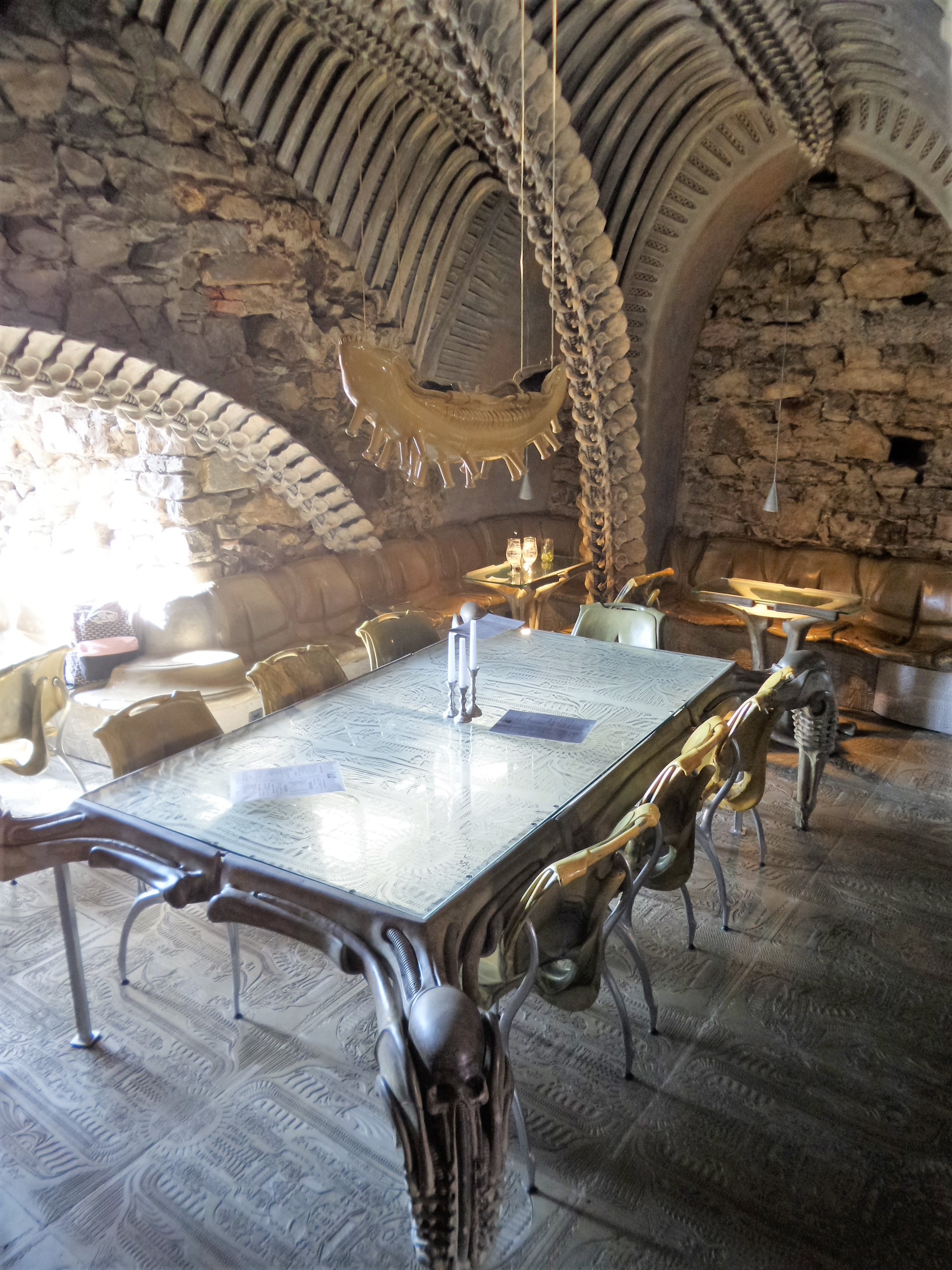
HR Giger Museum Bar

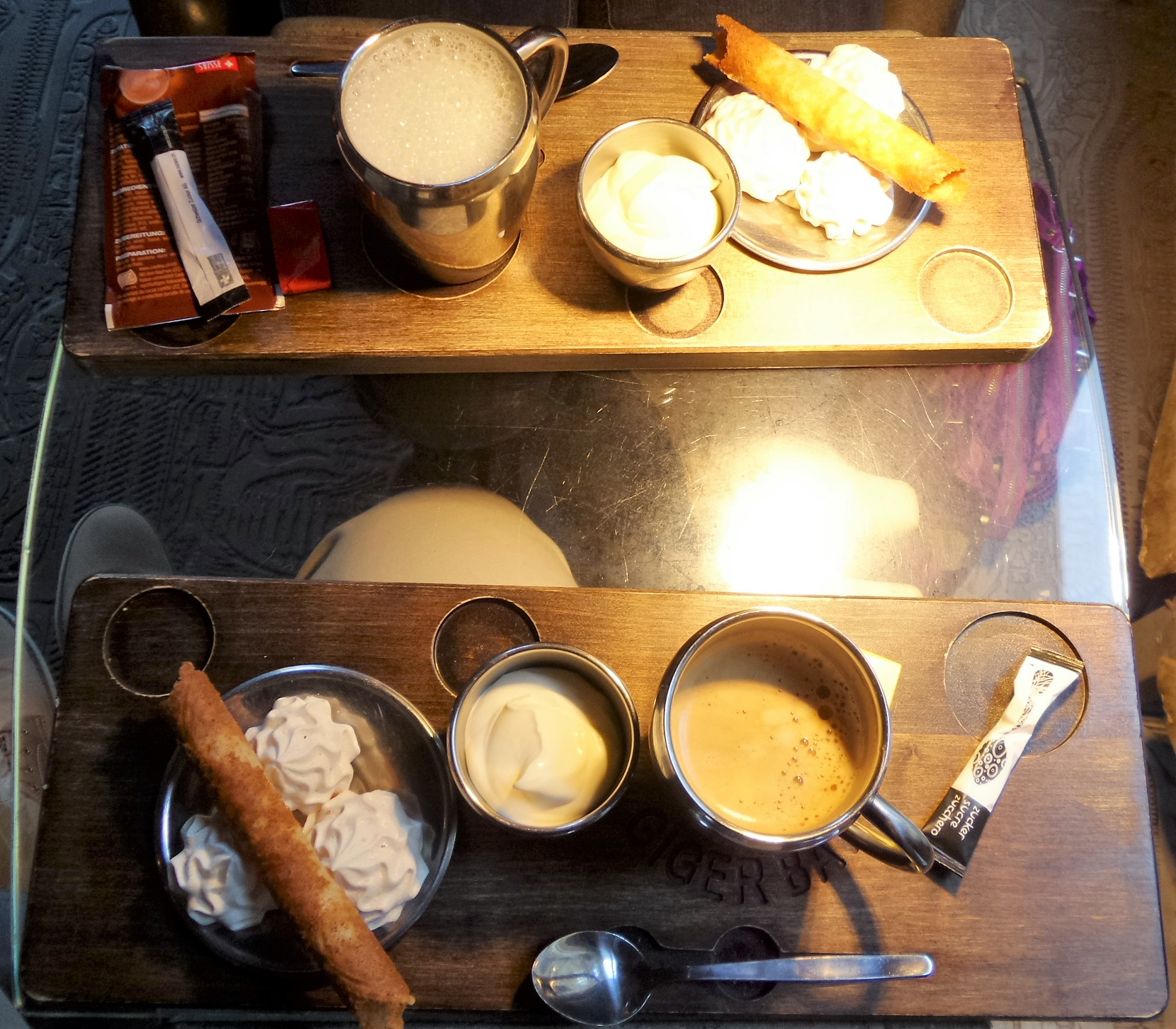
Food and beverages in 2017
Location of Giger Bars in Switzerland

== See also ==
- List of bars
- List of restaurants in Switzerland
