= Biomechanical art =

Surrealist art style

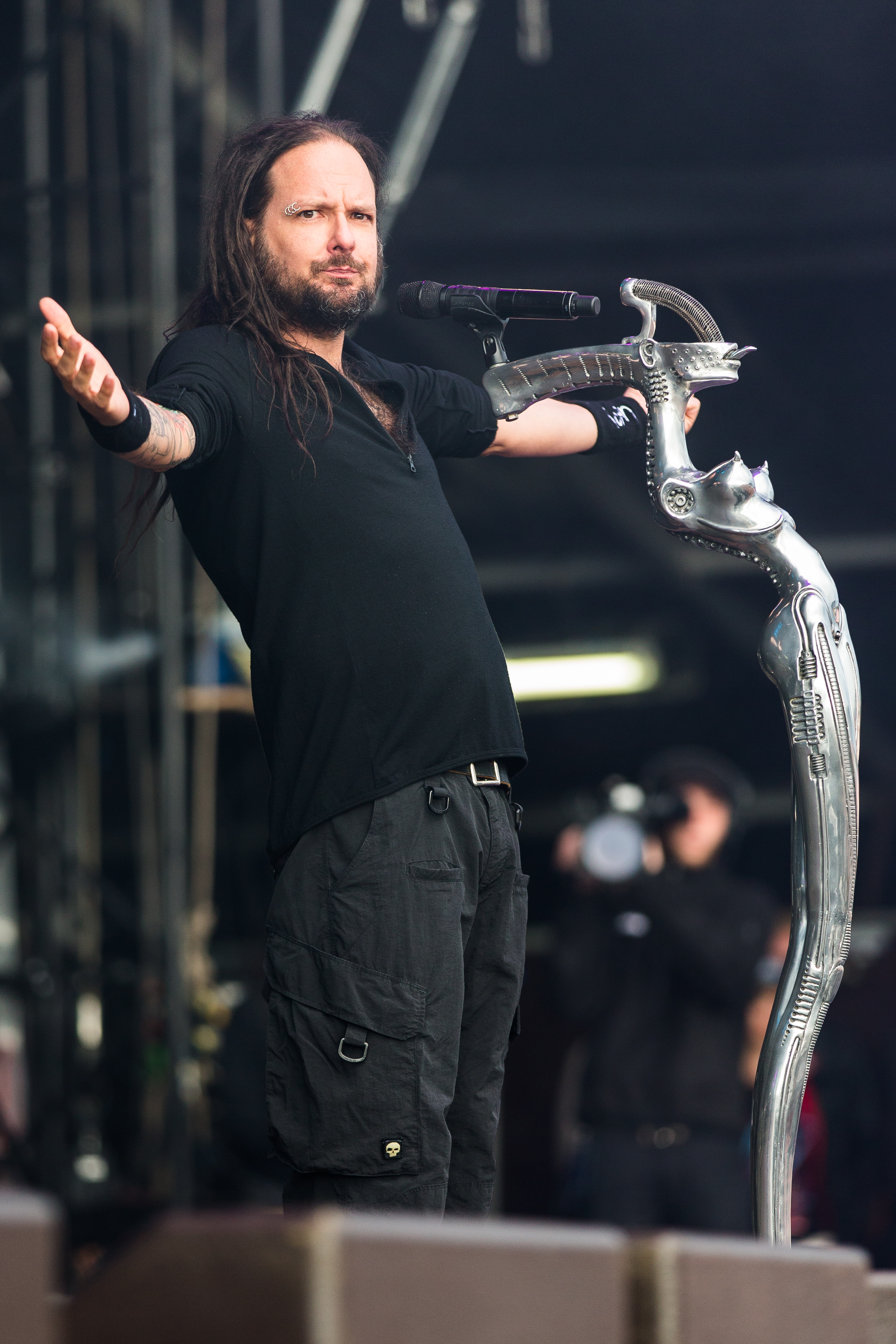
Jonathan Davis with a biomechanical microphone stand designed by Giger

Biomechanical art (also called Biomech) is a surrealistic style of art that combines elements of machines with organics. Rendered with distinct realism, biomechanical art expresses an internal fantasy world, most typically represented with human or animal anatomy where bones and joints are replaced with metal pistons and gears, but infused with muscles and tendons. Biomechanical art was popularized in 1979 when Swiss artist H. R. Giger designed the alien creatures in the 1979 feature film Alien.

== Biomechanical tattoo art ==
After the popularity of Ridley Scott's 1979 movie Alien, tattoo artists began tattooing images taken directly from the movie, and from artist H. R. Giger's Necronomicon series. As the biomechanical tattoo art style became increasingly popular, tattoo artists such as Guy Aitchison and Aaron Cain began designing their own original, biomechanical art, creating one of the most popular contemporary tattoo art movements.

== See also ==
- LED tattoo
