= Necronomicon (Giger book) =

Compendium of images by Swiss artist H. R. Giger

Dali edition.

Necronomicon was the first major published compendium of images by Swiss artist H. R. Giger. Originally published in 1977, the book was given to director Ridley Scott during the pre-production of the film Alien, who then hired Giger to produce artwork and conceptual designs for the film.

The book was originally published by Sphinx Verlag and was republished in 1991 by Morpheus International with additional artwork from Giger's Alien designs. A subsequent collection of his images followed as H. R. Giger's Necronomicon 2, printed in 1985 by Edition C of Switzerland.

Giger's Necronomicon is named for H. P. Lovecraft's Necronomicon, a fictional grimoire Lovecraft invented and used as a plot device in his stories.

Giger's Necronomicon was influential in the design of the 1993 video game Doom inspiring some of the disturbing environments and hellish monsters.
