= Comedy Workshop =

Comedy club in Houston, Texas, US

The Comedy Workshop and the attached Comix Annex was a comedy club in Houston, Texas. Opened in 1978 It was quite popular in the 1980s and the breeding ground for a group of influential comics, once known as the Texas Outlaw Comics that included Ron Shock, Riley Barber, Bill Hicks, Jimmy Pineapple, Steve Epstein, John Farnetti, Carl LaBove, Kevin Cawood and Andy Huggins. Comedian Brett Butler of Grace Under Fire fame and SNL longtime writer T. Sean Shannon honed their skills as members of the CW competitive dysfunction. In addition, Sam Kinison had his beginnings at the Workshop as well, with it being the location of where his 1993 posthumous comedy album, Live from Hell, was recorded.

The workshop side of the Comedy Workshop was a spawning ground for improvisational comedic actors, with regular shows made up of Sketches, primarily those grown out of improvisational exercises. The founders were Steve and Vicki Farrell and Paul and Sharon Menzel. It grew out of the collaboration of the Farrells and Menzels at Dudley Riggs' Brave New Workshop in Minneapolis, Minnesota, when the founders came to Houston in the 1970s.

Rich Mills, who went on to perform with the Farrells at the Radio Music Theater was a longtime collaborator.

Pat Southard was the Workshop's indispensable Keyboard player and offstage collaborator, contributing musical cues, live sound effects (including billiard balls in a one foot square pool table) and occasional voices. Pat, along with Rich Mills moved on to the Radio Music Theater with the Farrells.

Numerous alumni from the Workshop and the Comedy Workshop Touring Company went on to involvement in national projects. Pat Dougherty went on to write and produce the long Running sitcom Empty Nest, spun off from Golden Girls. Other notable performers at the Workshop or in the Touring Company include Jerry Young, Kathy Drago, Stewart Arnold, Pamela Richards, Roger Manning, Ken Polk, Ronnie Foster (sic), Karen Rosen, Toni Potts, Kevin Cawood, Shane McClure, Sylvia Cooper, EJ Nolan, Author, Dan Barton, Producer, Fred Greenlee, Ericc Davis, Louis Allen Epstein, Bill Silva, Philip Owens, Mike Shiloh, David Ayala, and Dee Macaluso, who was among many who worked both sides of the Workshop doing both Improv Comedy, as well as Standup in the Annex. The Workshop closed in the early 1990s and then became a dry cleaners, which closed as well.

The Comedy Workshop is now a high end liquor and wine store

The Comedy Workshop is now a Spec's Wines, Spirits & Finer Foods store as of November 13, 2026.
