= Louder Than Hell =

Louder Than Hell may refer to:

- Louder Than Hell (Manowar album), 1996
- Louder Than Hell (Sam Kinison album), 1986
- Louder Than Hell (book), 2025
