= Death metal =

Extreme subgenre of heavy metal music

- Stylistic origins: Thrash metal; first-wave black metal; hardcore punk
- Cultural origins: Mid-1980s, United States, primarily Florida and San Francisco Bay Area

Subgenres
- Brutal death metal; slam death metal; industrial death metal; melodic death metal; old school death metal; psychedelic death metal; symphonic death metal; technical death metal

Fusion genres
- Blackened death-doom; blackened death metal (melodic black-death; war metal); death-doom (funeral doom); deathcore; deathgrind; deathrash; death 'n' roll; goregrind (gorenoise; pornogrind)

Regional scenes
- Brazil; Florida; Indonesia; Netherlands; Sweden; Norway; Poland

Local scenes
- New York City

Other topics
- Extreme metal; blast beat; death growl; list of bands; Christian death metal

Death metal is an extreme subgenre of heavy metal music. It typically employs heavily distorted and low-tuned guitars, played with techniques such as palm muting and tremolo picking; deep growling vocals; aggressive, powerful drumming, featuring double kick and blast beat techniques; minor keys or atonality; abrupt tempo, key, and time signature changes; and chromatic chord progressions. The lyrical themes of death metal may include slasher film-style violence, political conflict, religion, nature, philosophy, true crime and science fiction.

Building from the musical structure of thrash metal and early black metal, death metal emerged during the mid-1980s. Bands such as Venom, Celtic Frost, Slayer, and Kreator were important influences on the genre's creation. Possessed, Death, Necrophagia, Obituary, Autopsy, and Morbid Angel are often considered pioneers of the genre. In the late 1980s and early 1990s, death metal gained more media attention as a popular genre. Niche record labels like Combat, Earache, and Roadrunner began to sign death metal bands at a rapid rate.

Since then, death metal has diversified, spawning several subgenres. Melodic death metal combines death metal elements with those of the new wave of British heavy metal. Technical death metal is a complex style, with uncommon time signatures, atypical rhythms, and unusual harmonies and melodies. Death-doom combines the deep growled vocals and double-kick drumming of death metal with the slow tempos and melancholic atmosphere of doom metal. Deathgrind, goregrind, and pornogrind mix the complexity of death metal with the intensity, speed, and brevity of grindcore. Deathcore combines death metal with metalcore traits. Death 'n' roll combines death metal's growled vocals and highly distorted, downtuned guitar riffs with elements of 1970s hard rock and heavy metal.

== History ==
=== Emergence and early history (early to mid–1980s) ===
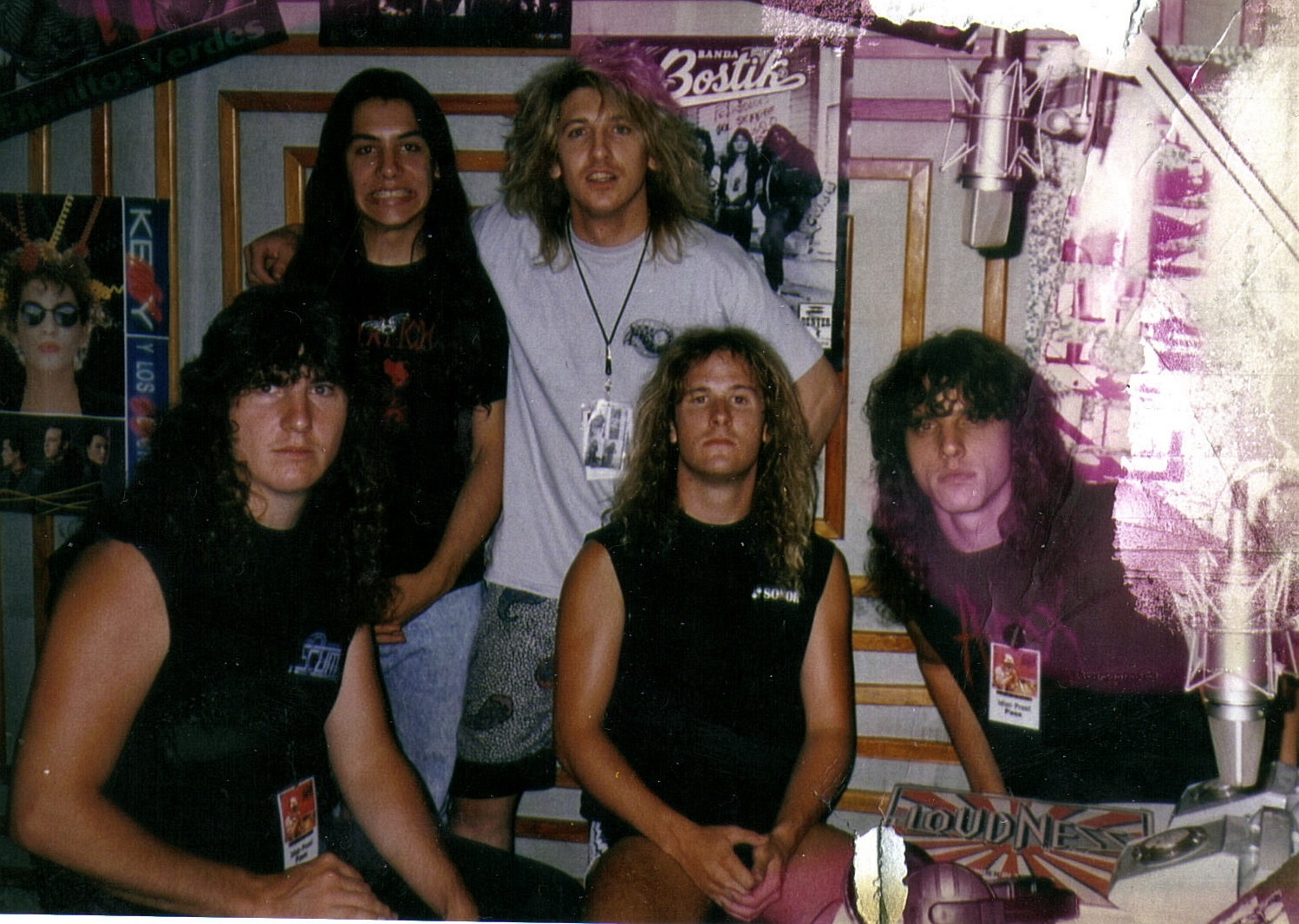
Pioneering death metal band Death in 1989

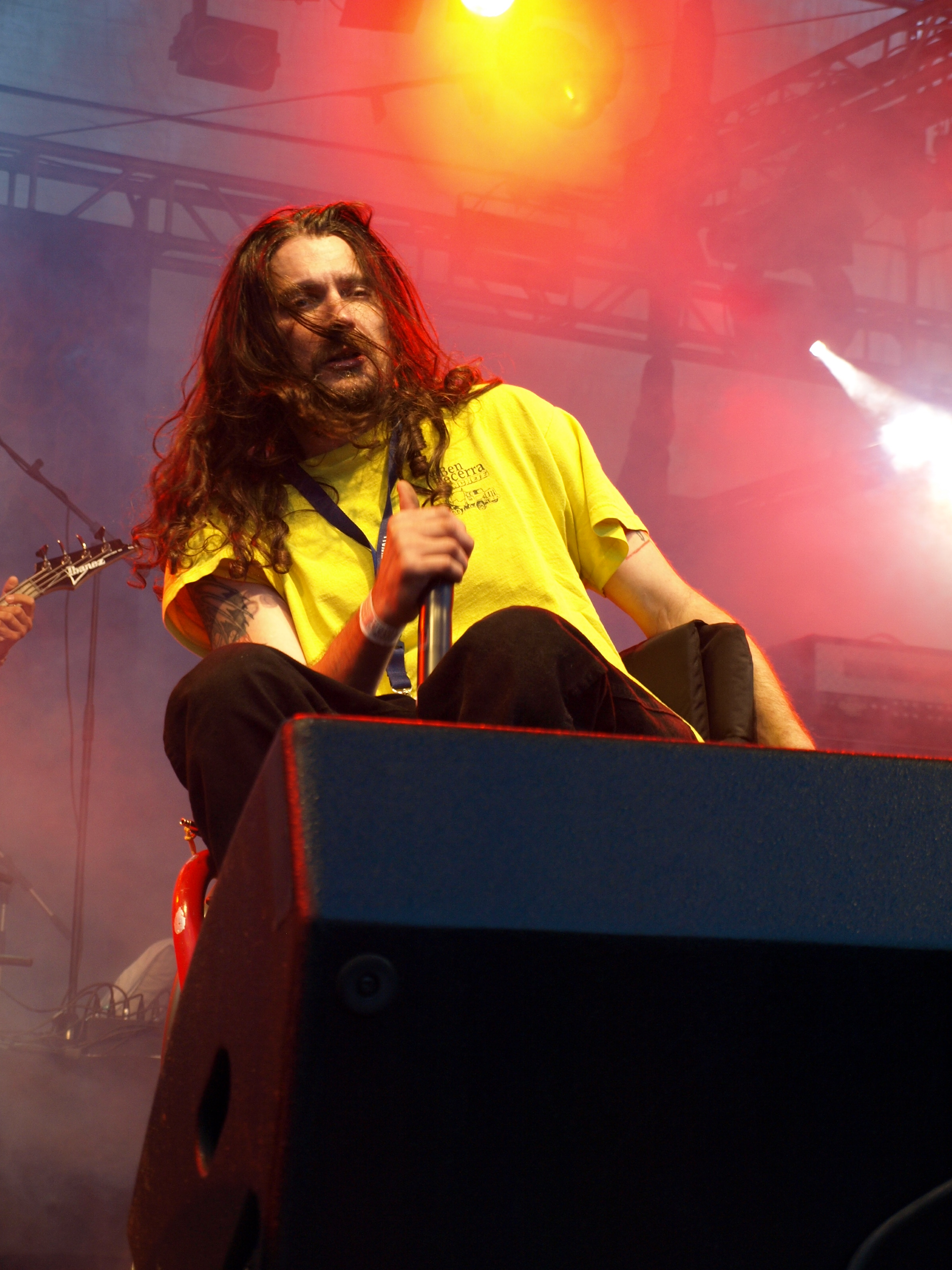
Jeff Becerra of Possessed

English extreme metal band Venom, from Newcastle, crystallized the elements of what later became known as thrash metal, death metal and black metal, with their first two albums Welcome to Hell and Black Metal, released in late 1981 and 1982, respectively. Their dark, blistering sound, harsh vocals, and macabre, proudly Satanic imagery proved a major inspiration for extreme metal bands. Another highly influential band, Slayer, formed in 1981. Although the band was a thrash metal act, Slayer's music was more violent than their thrash contemporaries Metallica, Megadeth, and Anthrax. Their breakneck speed and instrumental prowess combined with lyrics about death, violence, war, and Satanism won Slayer a cult following. According to Mike McPadden, Hell Awaits, Slayer's second album, "largely invent[ed] much of the sound and fury that would evolve into death metal." According to AllMusic, their third album Reign in Blood inspired the entire death metal genre. It had a big impact on genre leaders such as Death, Obituary, and Morbid Angel.

Possessed, a band that formed in the San Francisco Bay Area during 1983, is described by AllMusic as "connecting the dots" between thrash metal and death metal with their 1985 debut album, Seven Churches. While attributed as having a Slayer influence, current and former members of the band had actually cited Venom and Motörhead, as well as early work by Exodus, as the main influences on their sound. Although the group had released only two studio albums and an EP in their formative years, they have been described by music journalists and musicians as either being "monumental" in developing the death metal style, or as being the first death metal band. Earache Records noted that "the likes of Trey Azagthoth and Morbid Angel based what they were doing in their formative years on the Possessed blueprint laid down on the legendary Seven Churches recording. Possessed arguably did more to further the cause of 'Death Metal' than any of the early acts on the scene back in the mid-late 80's."

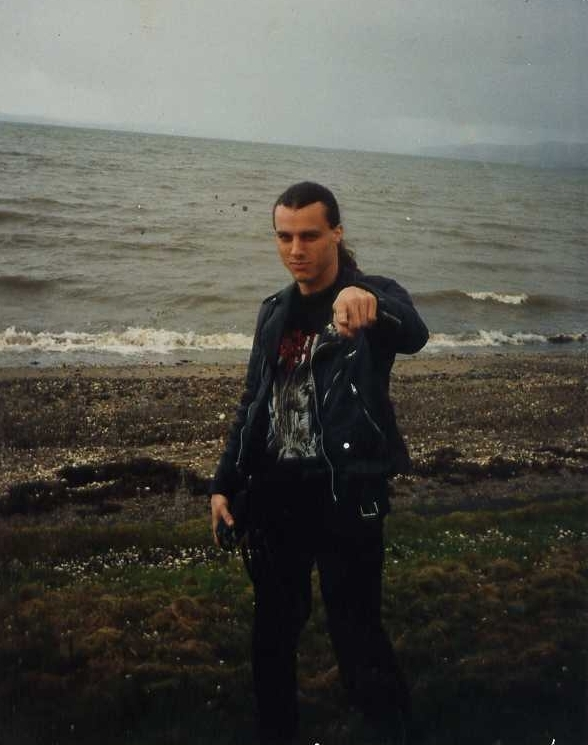
Chuck Schuldiner (1967–2001) of Death, during a 1992 tour in Scotland in support of the album Human.

During the same period as the dawn of Possessed, a second influential metal band was formed in Orlando, Florida. Originally called Mantas, Death was formed in 1983 by Chuck Schuldiner, Kam Lee, and Rick Rozz. Inspired by the Brandon, Florida act Nasty Savage, they took the sound of Nasty Savage and deepened it. In 1984, they released their first demo entitled Death by Metal, followed by several more. The tapes circulated through the tape trader world, quickly establishing the band's name. With Death guitarist Schuldiner adopting vocal duties, the band made a major impact in the emerging Florida death metal scene. The fast minor-key riffs and solos were complemented with fast drumming, creating a style that would catch on in tape trading circles. Schuldiner has been credited by AllMusic's Eduardo Rivadavia for being widely recognized as the "Father of Death Metal". Death's 1987 debut release, Scream Bloody Gore, has been described by About.com's Chad Bowar as being the "evolution from thrash metal to death metal", and "the first true death metal record" by the San Francisco Chronicle. In an Interview Jeff Becerra talked about the discussions of being the creator of the genre, saying that Schuldiner cited Possessed as a massive influence, and Death were even called "Possessed clones" early on. Along with Possessed and Death, other pioneers of death metal in the United States include Macabre, Master, Massacre, Immolation, Cannibal Corpse, Obituary, and Post Mortem.

=== Growing popularity (late 1980s to late 1990s) ===
Metal was always about oneupmanship, right? How to play it faster and heavier and make it more evil… You had speed/thrash metal taking it all to new speeds. So how do you top that? You add in death metal vocals and make it sound even heavier and more evil.

— A&R executive Monte Conner of Roadrunner Records, as quoted by Chris Chantler of Metal Hammer (April 6, 2025)

By 1989, many bands had been signed by eager record labels wanting to cash in on the subgenre, including Florida's Obituary, Morbid Angel and Deicide. This collective of death metal bands hailing from Florida are often labeled as "Florida death metal". Morbid Angel pushed the genre's limits both musically and lyrically, with the release of their debut album Altars of Madness in 1989. The album "redefined what it meant to be heavy while influencing an upcoming class of brutal death metal." According to Jason Birchmeier of AllMusic, "Venom and Slayer redefined the extent to which a metal band could align itself with all things evil during the beginning of the decade, but Morbid Angel made these two groups sound like children's music."

Following the original death metal innovators, new subgenres began to develop the end of the decade, such as melodic death metal. Death released their fourth album Human in 1991, which has become a hallmark in technical death metal. Death's founder Schuldiner helped push the boundaries of the genre with uncompromising speed and technical virtuosity, combining intricate rhythm guitar work with complex arrangements and emotive guitar solos.

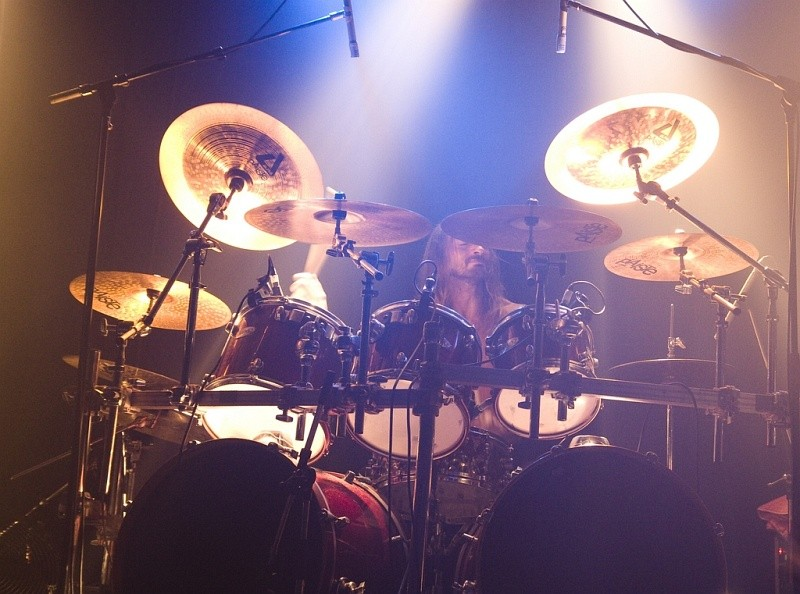
Deicide drummer Steve Asheim

Earache Records, Relativity Records and Roadrunner Records became the genre's most important labels, with Earache releasing albums by Carcass, Napalm Death, Morbid Angel, and Entombed, and Roadrunner releasing albums by Obituary and Pestilence. Although these labels had not been death metal labels, they initially became the genre's flagship labels at the beginning of the 1990s. In addition to these, other labels formed as well, such as Nuclear Blast, Century Media, and Peaceville. Many of these labels would go on to achieve successes in other genres of metal throughout the 1990s.

In September 1990, Death's manager Eric Greif held one of the first North American death metal festivals, Day of Death, in Milwaukee suburb Waukesha, Wisconsin, and featured 26 bands including Autopsy, Broken Hope, Hellwitch, Obliveon, Revenant, Viogression, Immolation, Atheist, and Cynic.

Death metal's popularity achieved its initial peak during 1992–1993, with some bands such as Morbid Angel and Cannibal Corpse enjoying mild commercial success. However, the genre as a whole never broke into the mainstream. The genre's mounting popularity may have been partly responsible for a strong rivalry between Norwegian black metal and Swedish death metal scenes. Fenriz of Darkthrone has noted that Norwegian black metal musicians were "fed up with the whole death metal scene" at the time. According to Joel McIver of Metal Hammer, "Many metalheads were fixated on the new wave of black metal emanating from Scandinavia, the UK and the US. Just as grunge had killed glam back in 1991, a new movement of corpsepainted bands was making the death metal scene look tedious, or worse, obsolete. Only the best would survive." Consequently, death metal diversified in the 1990s, spawning a variety of subgenres that maintain cult followings to the present day.

=== Later history (2000–present) ===
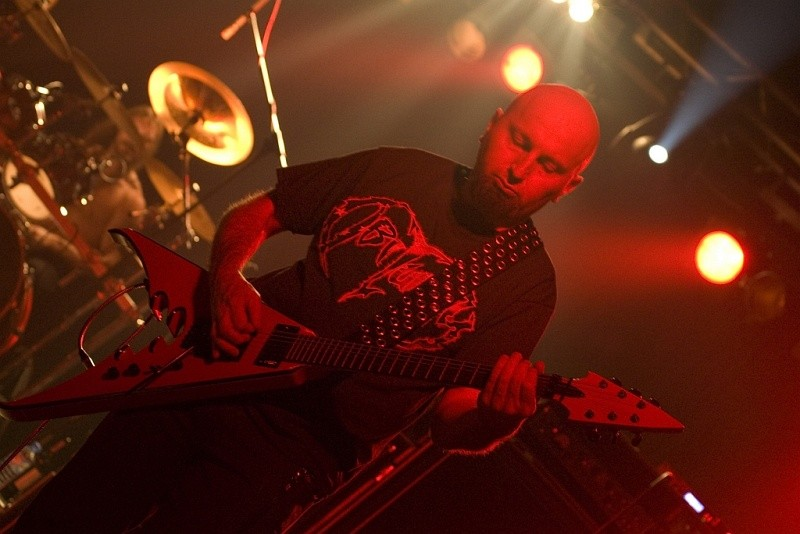
Guitarist Jack Owen has performed with death metal bands Cannibal Corpse, Deicide and Six Feet Under.

In the 2000s, a number of bands in the hardcore punk scene, including Black Breath and Trap Them began to incorporate elements of death metal into their sound. This was followed by a wave of bands expanding upon the death-doom style of Incantation while incorporating elements of ambient music, including Dead Congregation and Necros Christos.

In the 2010s, a movement of bands reviving the sound of original 1980s death metal emerged, termed the "New Wave of Old School Death Metal". One of the earliest groups in this wave was Horrendous, who formed in 2009, who along with Tomb Mold took a progressive take the genre. Tomb Mold, Necrot, Undergang and Blood Incantation were some of the earliest bands to gain traction in the 2010s, with the COVID-19 pandemic amplifying the amount of attention drawn to the movement, through Cryptic Shift, Slimelord and Vaticinal Rites. In a 2022 article by MetalSucks writer Christopher Krovatin stated "Right now, as a music journalist, all I hear about is death metal." In the UK, this movement became the "New Wave of British Death Metal", fronted by Mortuary Spawn, Vacuous and Celestial Sanctuary, this name being coined by Tom Cronin, of Celestial Sanctuary, in order to separate these hardcore-indebted bands from the country's prior movements. The earliest bands in this wave were Cruciamentum and Grave Miasma.

A large part of the New Wave of Old School Death Metal was death metal bands who originated from the hardcore scene, some of which merge elements of hardcore into their style. Xibalba and Fuming Mouth were two of the earliest groups, with the wave being solidified by Gatecreeper, 200 Stab Wounds, Creeping Death, Sanguisugabogg and Kruelty. Venom Prison came from this scene and gained particular attention for their confrontation of what Kerrang! called death metal's "misogyny problem", by instead writing "rape-revenge narrative[s]". Their lead vocalist Larissa Stupar was described by the publication as "metal's most important - and uncompromising - voice".

== Characteristics ==
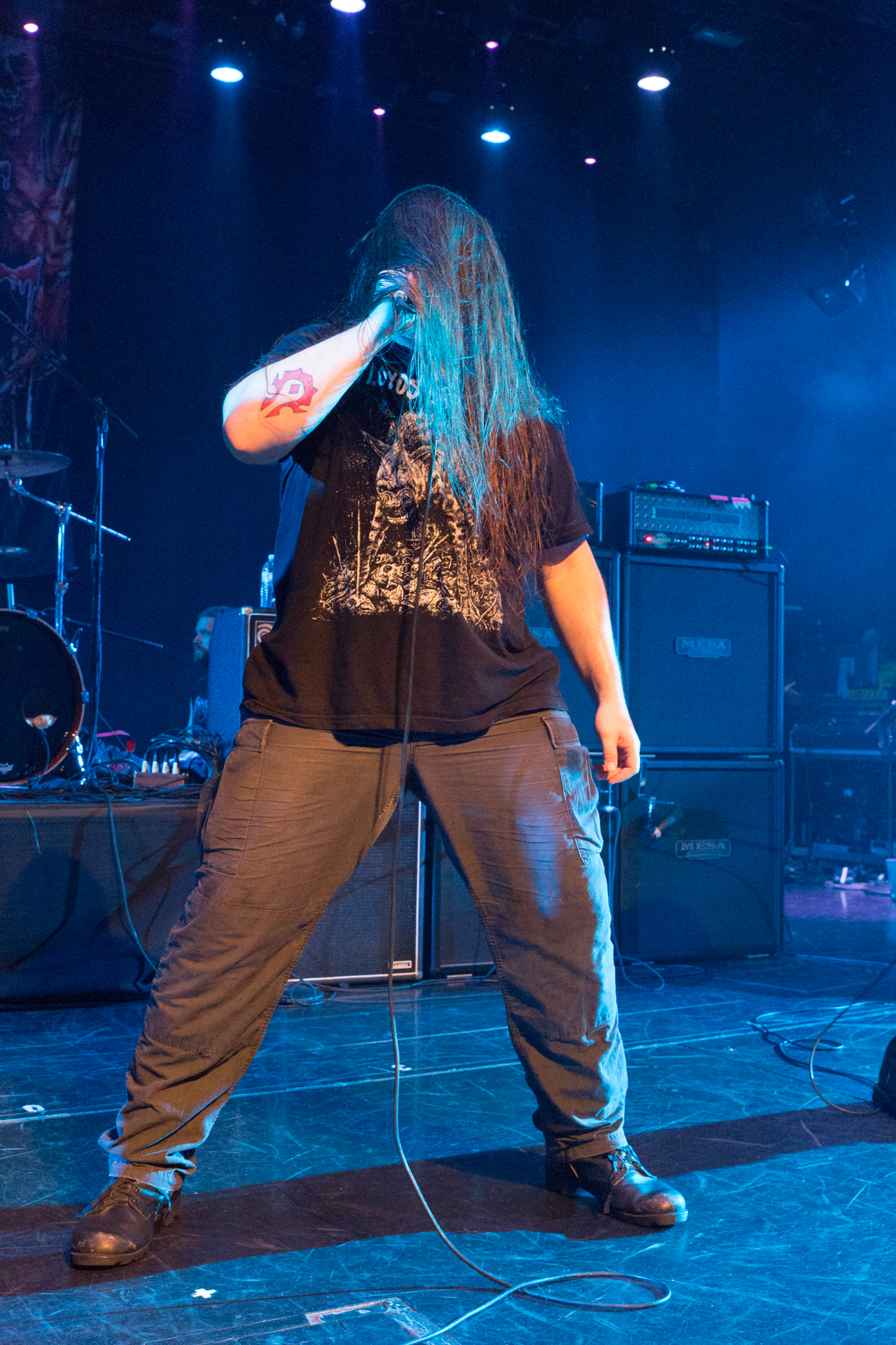
Cannibal Corpse vocalist George "Corpsegrinder" Fisher

The vocals became so inhuman, and that was a big step. It's like, "I'm no longer going to sing as a person. I'm going to sound like a demon." Thrash bands were pissed, and that's why they shouted. Death metal bands were possessed. It was a whole other level of evil.

— Revolver editor-in-chief Brandon Geist as quoted in the book Louder Than Hell by Jon Weiderhorn and Katherine Truman (page 460)

The setup most frequently used within the death metal genre is two guitarists, a bass player, a vocalist, and a drummer often using "hyper double-bass blast beats". Although this is the standard setup, bands have been known to occasionally incorporate other instruments such as electronic keyboards.

Death metal vocals are referred to as death growls, which are coarse roars/snarls. Death growling is mistakenly thought to be a form of screaming using the lowest vocal register known as vocal fry, but vocal fry is actually a form of overtone screaming. While growling can be performed this way by experienced vocalists who use the fry screaming technique, "true" death growling is in fact created by an altogether different technique. Growling has been called Cookie Monster vocals, tongue-in-cheek, due to the vocal similarity to the voice of the popular Sesame Street character. Although often criticized, death growls serve the aesthetic purpose of matching death metal's aggressive lyrical content. Some death metal bands may also incorporate "pig squeals", a vocal style that Loudwire characterizes as a "breeee" sound.

The lyrical themes of death metal may invoke slasher film-stylised violence, but may also extend to topics like religion (sometimes including Satanism), occultism, Lovecraftian horror, nature, mysticism, mythology, theology, philosophy, science fiction, and politics. Although violence may be explored in various other genres as well, death metal may elaborate on the details of extreme acts, including blood and gore, psychopathy, delirium, mutilation, mutation, dissection, exorcism, torture, rape, cannibalism, and necrophilia. Sociologist Keith Kahn-Harris commented this apparent glamorisation of violence may be attributed to a "fascination" with the human body that all people share to some degree, a fascination that mixes desire and disgust. Heavy metal author Gavin Baddeley also stated there does seem to be a connection between one's degree of mortality salience and "how much they crave images of death and violence" via the media. Additionally, contributing artists to the genre often defend death metal as little more than an extreme form of art and entertainment, similar to horror films in the motion picture industry. This explanation has brought such musicians under fire from activists internationally, who claim that this is often lost on a large number of adolescents, who are left with the glamorisation of such violence without social context or awareness of why such imagery is stimulating.

According to Alex Webster, bassist of Cannibal Corpse, "The gory lyrics are probably not, as much as people say, [what's keeping us] from being mainstream. Like, 'death metal would never go into the mainstream because the lyrics are too gory?' I think it's really the music, because violent entertainment is totally mainstream." Christian death metal bands often utilize the gory themes of death metal to invoke violent imagery against Satan, demons, sin and sinners, much of the violent imagery being drawn from the Bible. Satanic and anti-Christian imagery is also frequently inverted.

== Etymology ==
By 1984, Venom-influenced acts crept through the underground, peddling aggressive thrash with gruff vocals: San Francisco's Possessed released the Death Metal demo, Switzerland's Hellhammer appeared on a compilation called Death Metal, and Florida's Death put out Death By Metal. Notice a theme yet?

— Lee du-Caine and Joel McIver of MusicRadar,

Verifiable uses of the term "death metal" began around 1983, however it was largely interchangeable with what is now understood as thrash metal. The 1983 premier issue of the zine Metal Chaos used the term to describe the music that disc-jockey Gene Khoury played on WMSC (FM) and the Winter 1983–1984 issue of Metal Forces used the term to describe Metal Church and Hellhammer.

During 1984, use of the term began to gravitate towards more extreme bands, such as Bathory, Destruction, Onslaught, Slayer and Sodom. Hellhammer, in particular, put a significant emphasis on the term, being used in the liner notes for Apocalyptic Raids (1984), and being used as the name for both Thomas Fischer and Martin Ain's zine, and their split album Death Metal (1984). The same year Possessed released their demo, Death Metal; featuring an eponymous song which would also be featured on the band's 1985 debut album, Seven Churches. In an interview for Choosing Death: The Improbable History of Death Metal & Grindcore, Possessed vocalist and bassist Jeff Becerra said he coined the term for a high school English class assignment, stating "I figured speed metal and black metal were already taken, so what the fuck? So I said death metal, because that word wasn't associated with Venom or anybody else. It wasn't even about redefining it. We were playing this music and we were trying to be the heaviest thing on the face of the planet. We wanted just to piss people off and send everybody home. And that can't be, like, flower metal."

== Subgenres and fusion genres ==
Cited examples are not necessarily exclusive to one particular style. Many bands can easily be placed in two or more of the following categories, and a band's specific categorization is often a source of contention due to personal opinion and interpretation. The musical genres in this list are sorted alphabetically.

=== Blackened death-doom ===
Blackened death-doom is a microgenre that combines the slow tempos and monolithic drumming of doom metal, the complex and loud riffage of death metal and the shrieking vocals of black metal. Examples of blackened death-doom bands include Morast, Faustcoven, The Ruins of Beverast, Bölzer, Necros Christos, Harvest Gulgaltha, Dragged into Sunlight, Hands of Thieves, and Soulburn. Kim Kelly, journalist from Vice, has called Faustcoven "one of the finest bands to ever successfully meld black, death, and doom metal into a cohesive, legible whole."

=== Blackened death metal ===
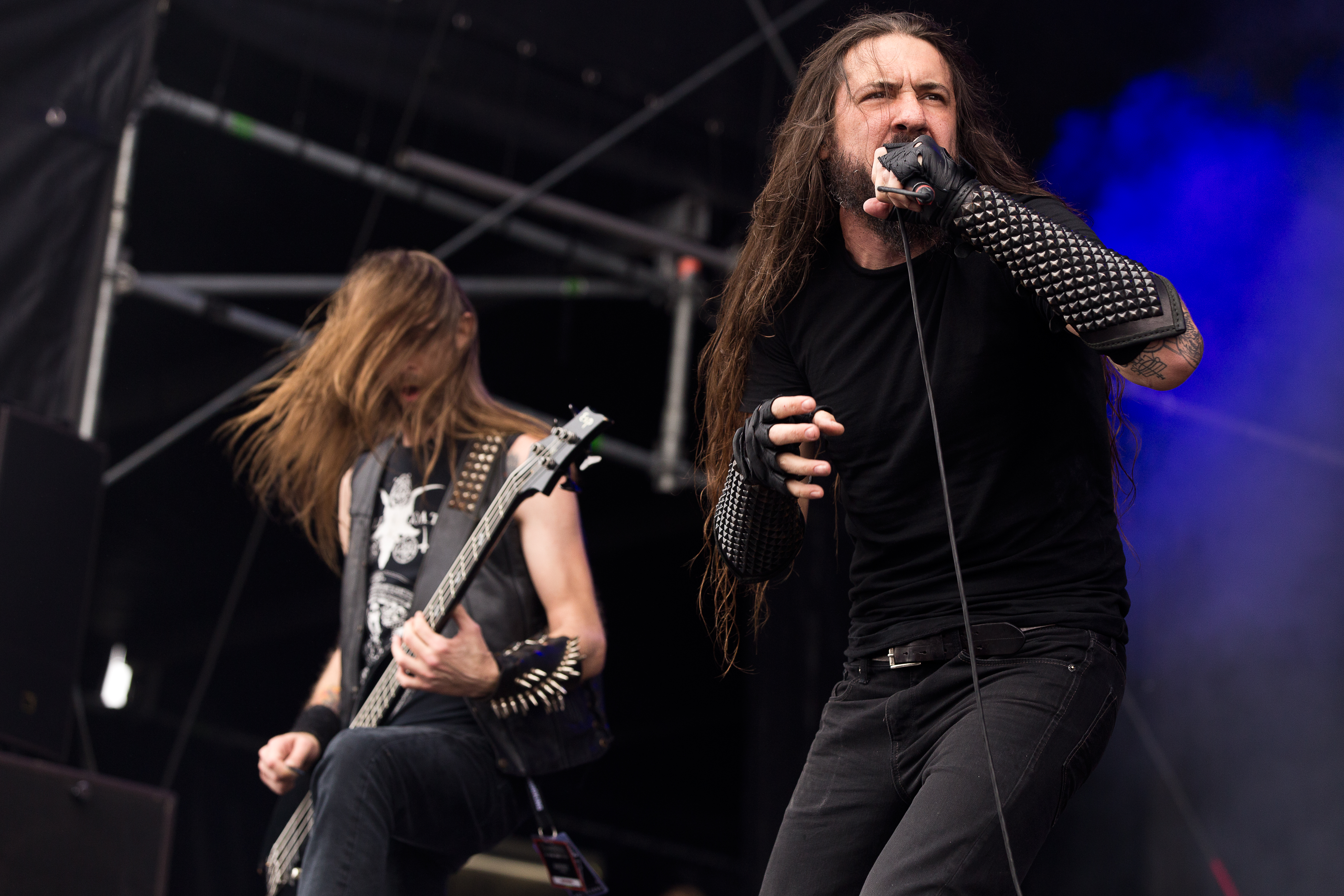
Blackened death metal band Goatwhore.

Blackened death metal is commonly death metal that incorporates musical, lyrical or ideological elements of black metal, such as an increased use of tremolo picking, anti-Christian or Satanic lyrical themes and chord progressions similar to those used in black metal. Blackened death metal bands are also more likely to wear corpse paint and suits of armour, than bands from other styles of death metal. Lower range guitar tunings, death growls and abrupt tempo changes are common in the genre. Examples of blackened death metal bands are Belphegor, Behemoth, Akercocke, and Sacramentum.

==== Melodic black-death ====
Melodic black-death (also known as blackened melodic death metal or melodic blackened death metal) is a genre of extreme metal that describes the style created when melodic death metal bands began being inspired by black metal and European romanticism. However, unlike most other black metal, this take on the genre would incorporate an increased sense of melody and narrative. Some bands who have played this style include Dissection, Sacramentum, Naglfar, God Dethroned, Dawn, Unanimated, Thulcandra, Skeletonwitch and Cardinal Sin.

==== War metal ====
War metal (also known as war black metal or bestial black metal) is an aggressive, cacophonous and chaotic subgenre of blackened death metal, described by Rock Hard journalist Wolf-Rüdiger Mühlmann as "rabid" and "hammering". Important influences include first-wave black metal band Sodom, first-wave black metal/death metal band Possessed as well as old grindcore, black and death metal bands like Repulsion, Autopsy, Sarcófago and the first two Sepultura releases. War metal bands include Blasphemy, Archgoat, Impiety, In Battle, Beherit, Crimson Thorn, Bestial Warlust, and Zyklon-B.

=== Brutal death metal ===
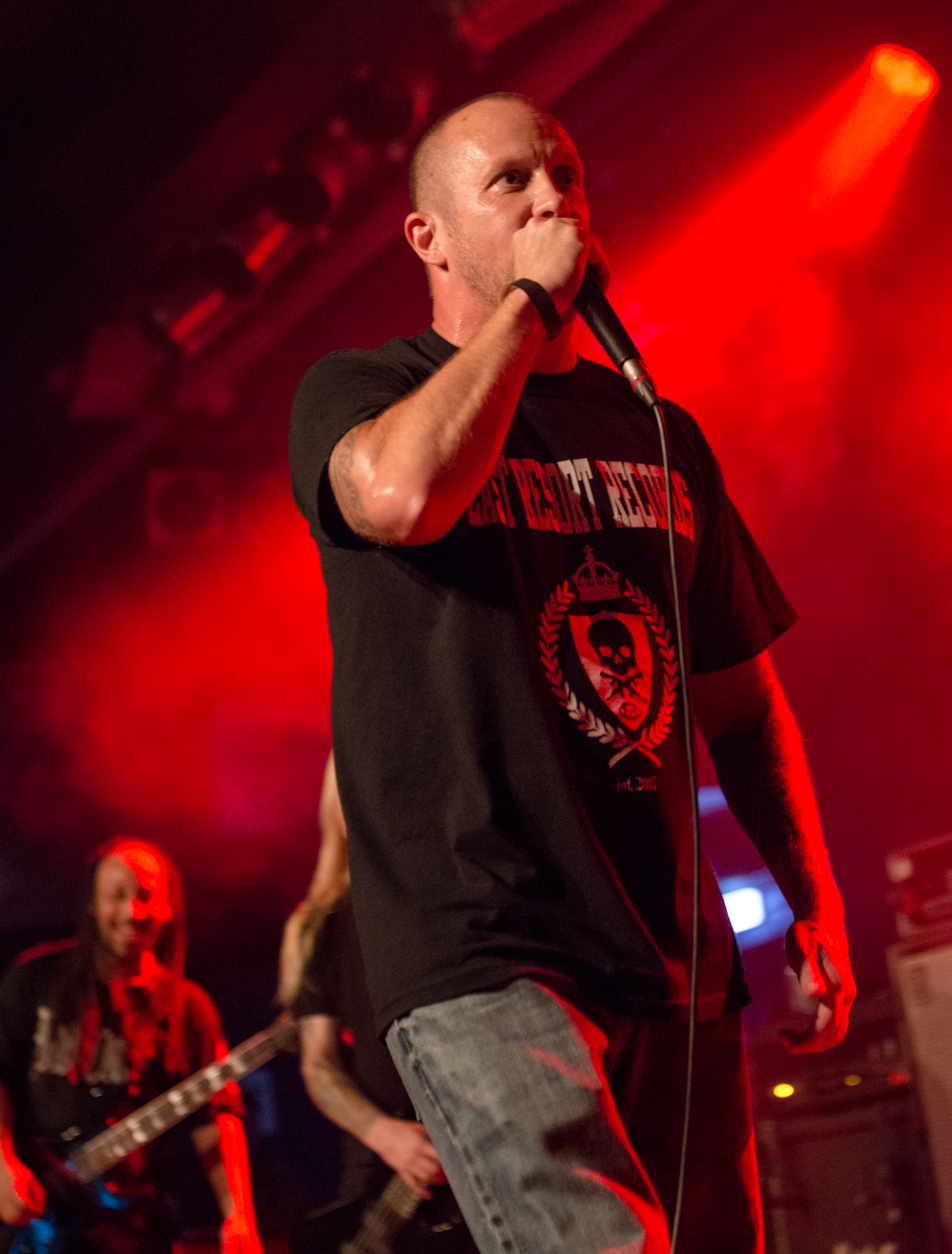
Suffocation vocalist Frank Mullen

Brutal death metal is a subgenre of death metal that prioritizes heaviness, speed, and complex rhythms over other aspects, such as melody and timbres. Brutal death metal bands employ high-speed, palm-muted power chording and single-note riffage. Notable bands include Cannibal Corpse, Dying Fetus, Suffocation, Cryptopsy, and Skinless.

==== Slam death metal ====
Slam death metal is a brutal death metal microgenre that evolved from the 1990s New York death metal scene, incorporating elements of hardcore punk. In contrast to other death metal styles, it is not generally focused on guitar solos and blast beats; instead, it employs mid-tempo rhythms, breakdowns, and palm-muted riffing, as well as hip-hop-inspired vocal and drum beat rhythms. The breakdown riff of Suffocation's "Liege of Inveracity" has been credited by Rolling Stone as the first slam riff in death metal. The first wave of bands in the genre were New York bands like Internal Bleeding and Pyrexia, with notable subsequent acts including Devourment and Cephalotripsy.

=== Death-doom ===
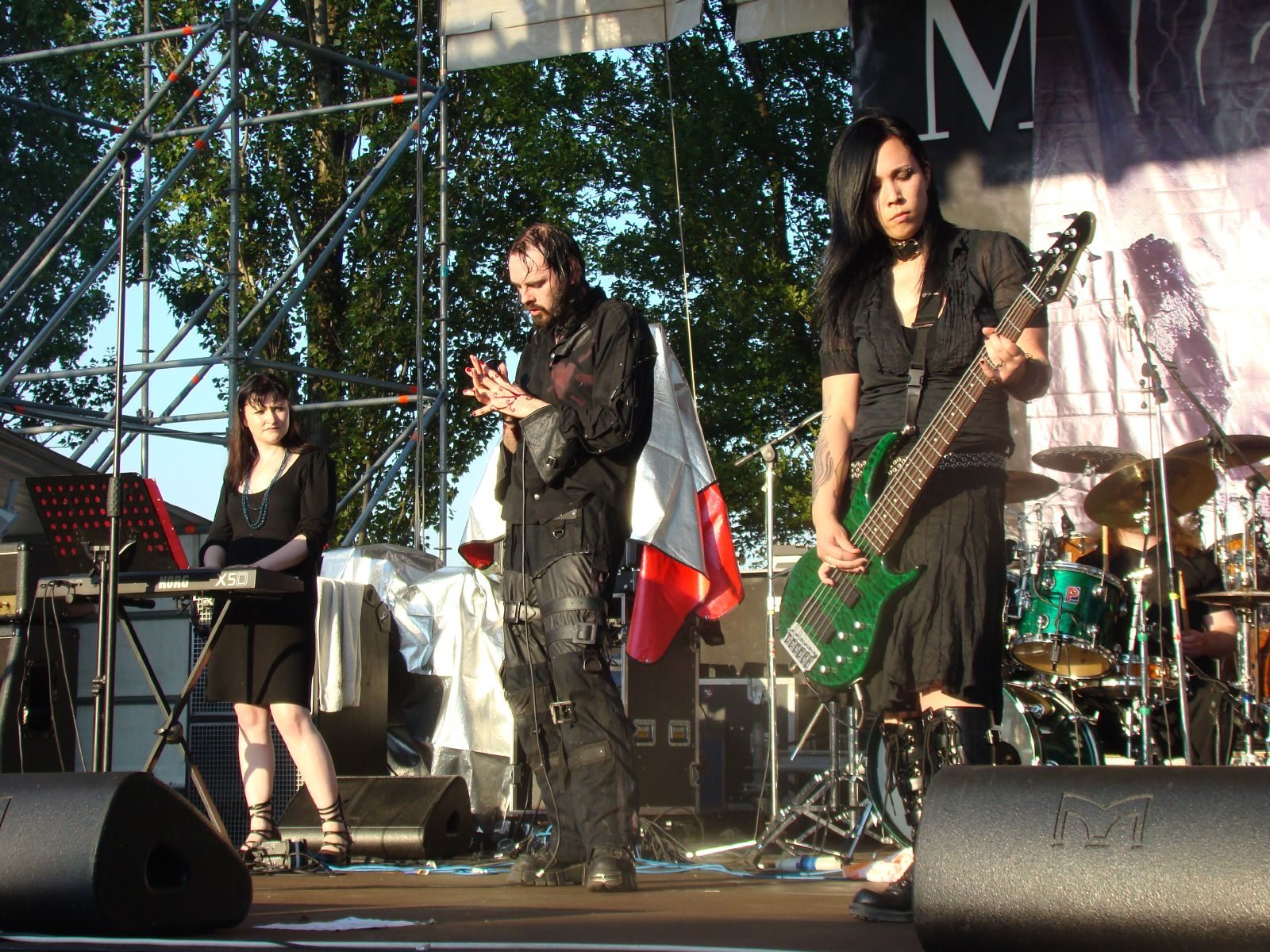
My Dying Bride at Frozen Rock Fest. 2007.

Death-doom is a style that combines the slow tempos and pessimistic atmosphere of doom metal with the deep growling vocals and double-kick drumming of death metal. Influenced mostly by the early work of Hellhammer and Celtic Frost, the style emerged during the late 1980s and gained a certain amount of popularity during the 1990s. Death-doom was also pioneered by bands such as Winter, Disembowelment, Paradise Lost, Autopsy, Anathema, and My Dying Bride.

==== Funeral doom ====
Funeral doom is a genre that crosses death-doom with funeral dirge music. It is played at a very slow tempo, and places an emphasis on evoking a sense of emptiness and despair. Typically, electric guitars are heavily distorted and dark ambient aspects such as keyboards or synthesizers are often used to create a dreamlike atmosphere. Vocals consist of mournful chants or growls and are often in the background. Funeral doom was pioneered by Mournful Congregation (Australia), Esoteric (United Kingdom), Evoken (United States), Funeral (Norway), Thergothon (Finland), and Skepticism (Finland).

=== Death 'n' roll ===
Death 'n' roll is a style that combines death metal's growled vocals and highly distorted detuned guitar riffs along with elements of 1970s hard rock and heavy metal. Notable examples include Entombed, Gorefest, and Six Feet Under.

=== Deathcore ===
Deathcore is a subgenre that merges the intensity of death metal with the aggressive elements of metalcore. It is characterized by fast drumming, including blast beats, down-tuned guitars, tremolo picking, growled vocals, high-pitched shrieks, and the breakdowns typical of metalcore. Decibel magazine noted that "one of Suffocation's trademarks, breakdowns, has spawned an entire metal subgenre: deathcore." Dying Fetus was also influencing deathcore through their extensive use of slam riffs, breakdowns, and hardcore-inspired grooves. Their 1996 album Purification Through Violence and 1998's Killing on Adrenaline introduced a mix of brutal death metal and hardcore elements that would later be adopted by deathcore bands. Bands such as Despised Icon, Suicide Silence, Salt the Wound and All Shall Perish combine the technicality of death metal with the breakdown-driven structures of metalcore, creating a distinct and influential sound.

=== Deathgrind, goregrind and pornogrind ===
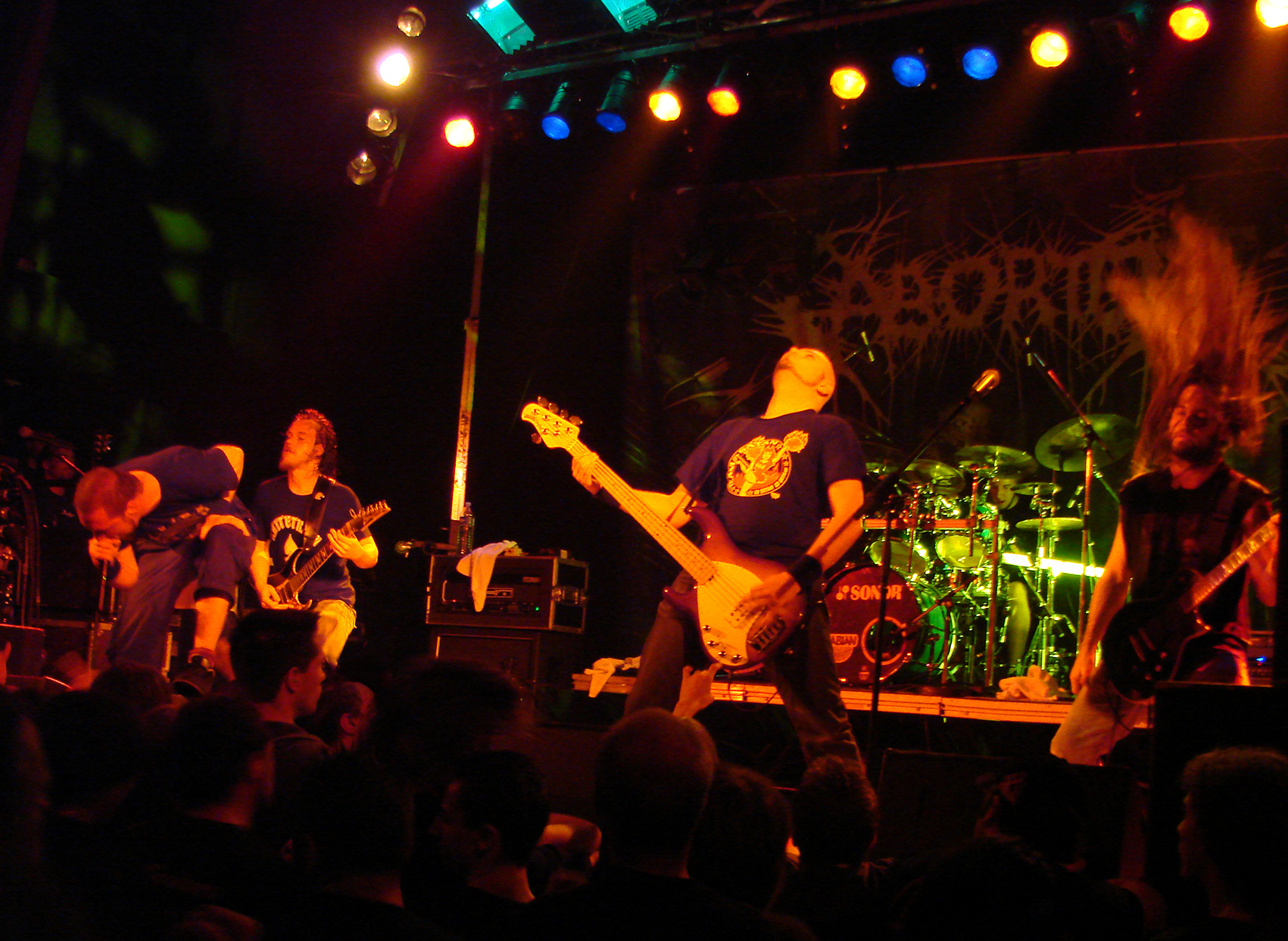
Aborted are "key contributors to the death-grind genres," according to AllMusic.

Goregrind, deathgrind and pornogrind are styles that mix grindcore with death metal, with goregrind focused on themes like gore and forensic pathology, and pornogrind dealing with sexual and pornographic themes. Some notable examples of these genres are Brujeria, Cattle Decapitation, Cephalic Carnage, Pig Destroyer, Circle of Dead Children, Rotten Sound, Gut, and Cock and Ball Torture.

==== Gorenoise ====
Gorenoise is an offshoot of goregrind and noisecore that abandons rock-based sounds for harsh noise. New Noise Magazine characterized the genre as drum machines "hammer[ing] at 1,000 BPM over top of gurgling pitch-shifted toilet vocals". Album cover art often incorporates graphic crime scene photos and depictions of entrails. The band Anal Birth is credited as one of the progenitors of gorenoise. Other projects noted for producing gorenoise are Elephant Man Behind the Sun, the early work of Torture, Meekness, and Melanocytic Tumors of Uncertain Malignant Potential.

=== Deathrash ===
Deathrash, also known as death-thrash, is a shorthand term to describe bands who play a fusion of death metal and thrash metal. The genre gained notoriety in Bali, Indonesia, where it attracted criticism of being related to the accelerated tourism development on the island and the superseding of its local culture, particularly by Jakartan one. Notable bands include Grave, Deceased, Mortification, The Crown, Incapacity, Solstice, Darkane, Deathchain, Opprobrium, and Sepultura.

=== Industrial death metal ===
Industrial death metal is a genre of death metal that adds elements of industrial music. Some notable bands include Fear Factory, Anaal Nathrakh, Autokrator, and Meathook Seed.

=== Melodic death metal ===
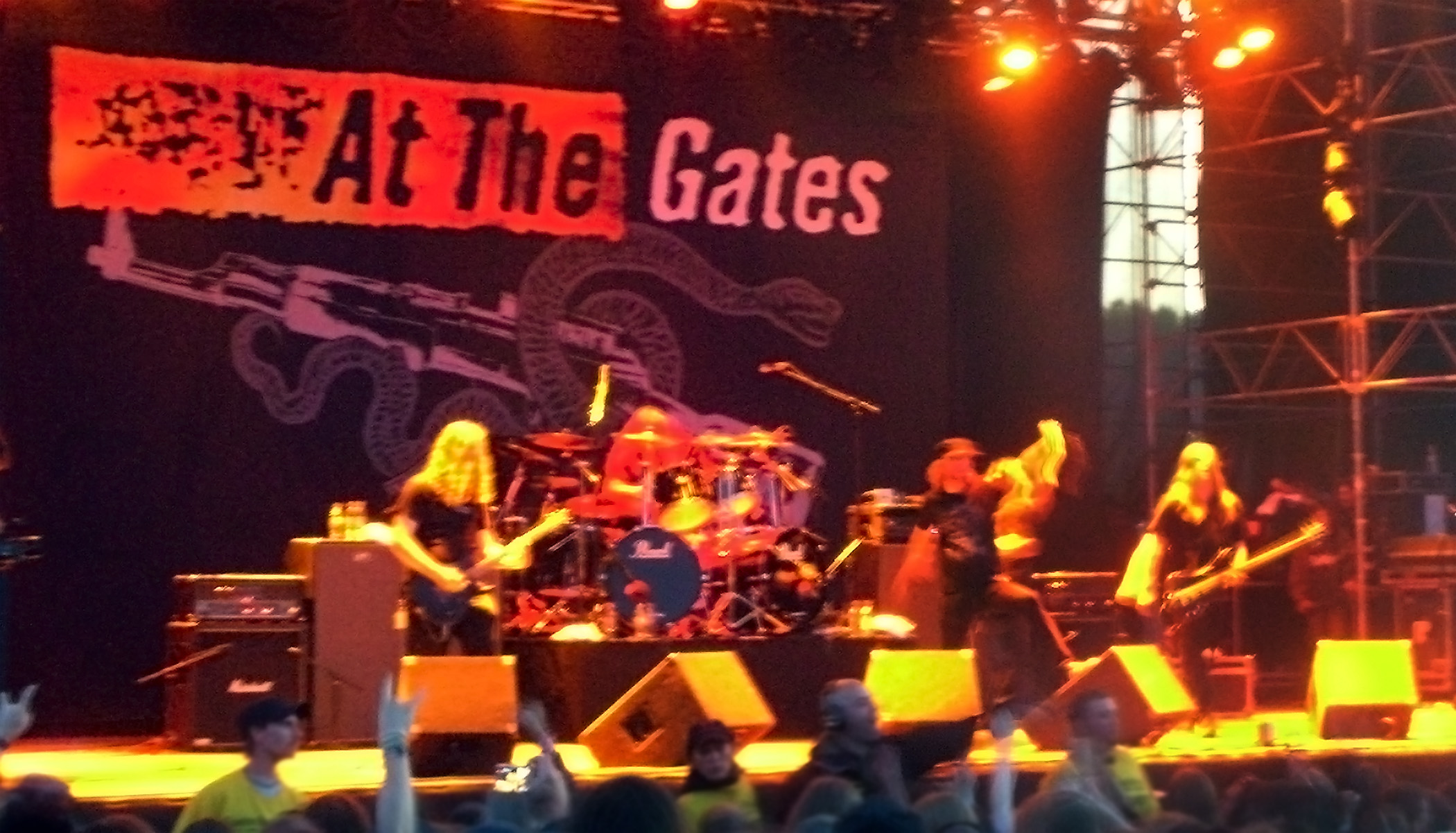
Melodic death metal band At the Gates performing in 2008.

Swedish death metal could be considered the forerunner of "melodic death metal". Melodic death metal, occasionally shortened to "melodeath", is a fusion of heavy metal with elements of death metal. The subgenre is heavily influenced by the new wave of British heavy metal. Unlike most other death metal, melodeath usually features screams instead of growls, slower tempos, and much stronger emphasis on melody. Clean vocals may be used on occasion. Carcass is sometimes credited with releasing the first melodic death metal album with 1993's Heartwork, although Swedish bands In Flames, Dark Tranquillity, and At the Gates are usually mentioned as the main pioneers of the genre and of the Gothenburg metal sound.

=== Old school death metal ===
Old school death metal is a style of death metal that is characterized by slower tempos and simpler song structures.The style typically employs fewer blast beats and is less concerned with the technical aspects of songwriting. It gained prominence in the late 1990s, with bands like Repugnant, Thanatos, Necrophagia, Abscess, Bloodbath and Mortem.

=== Psychedelic death metal ===
Psychedelic death metal is death metal that incorporates elements of psychedelic music, such as Blood Incantation, Tomb Mold and Gigan. According to Stereogum: "The mere idea of psychedelic death metal appears self-evidently contradictory, like eco-friendly corporations or compassionate conservatism. Psychedelia aims toward the sky, toward astral beauty and transcendence, while death metal wallows in the muck of rage and viscera."

=== Symphonic death metal ===
Symphonic death metal is a genre of death metal that adds elements of classical music. Bands described as symphonic death metal include Fleshgod Apocalypse, Septicflesh, MaYaN, and Children of Bodom. Haggard's 2000 album, Awaking the Centuries, has been described as death metal-styled symphonic metal.

=== Technical death metal ===
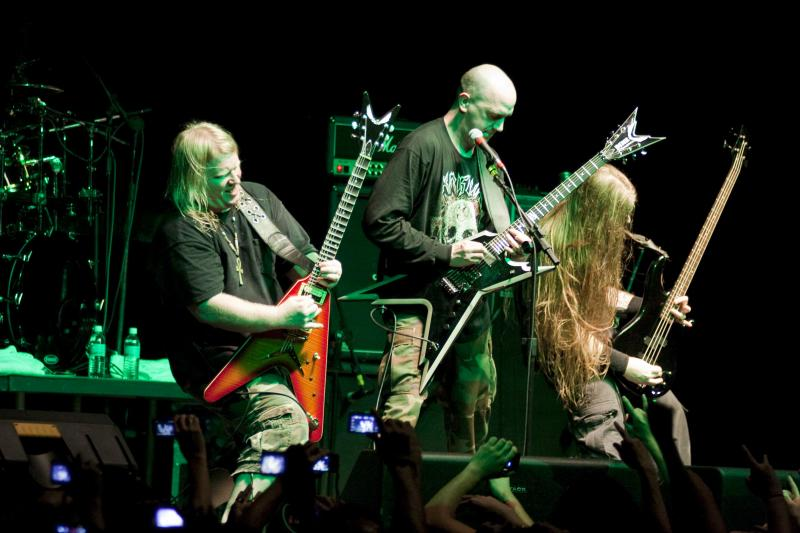
Technical death metal band Nile performing in 2010.

Technical death metal (also known as tech-death, progressive death metal, or prog-death) is a subgenre of death metal that employs dynamic song structures, uncommon time signatures, atypical rhythms and unusual harmonies and melodies. Bands described as technical death metal or progressive death metal usually fuse common death metal aesthetics with elements of progressive rock, jazz or classical music. While the term technical death metal is sometimes used to describe bands that focus on speed and extremity as well as complexity, the line between progressive and technical death metal is thin. Tech death and prog death, for short, are terms commonly applied to such bands as Nile, Edge of Sanity, and Opeth. Necrophagist and Spawn of Possession are known for a classical music-influenced death metal style. Death metal pioneers Death also refined their style in a more progressive direction in their final years. Some albums for this subgenre are Hallucinations (1990) by the German band Atrocity and Death's Human (1991). This style has significantly influenced many bands, creating a stream that in Europe was carried out at first by bands such as Gory Blister and Electrocution. The Polish band Decapitated gained recognition as one of Europe's primary modern technical death metal acts.

== See also ==
- List of death metal bands

== Bibliography ==
- Christe, Ian (2003). Sound of the Beast: The Complete Headbanging History of Heavy Metal. HarperCollins. ISBN 978-0-380-81127-4.
- Ekeroth, Daniel (2008). Swedish Death Metal. Bazillion Points. ISBN 978-0-9796163-1-0.
- Kahn-Harris, Keith (2007). Extreme Metal: Music and Culture on the Edge. Berg Publishers. ISBN 978-1-84520-399-3.
- McIver, Joel (2000). Extreme Metal. Omnibus Press. ISBN 978-88-7333-005-9.
- Mudrian, Albert (2004). Choosing Death: The Improbable History of Death Metal & Grindcore. Feral House. ISBN 978-1-932595-04-8.
- Netherton, Jason (2014). Extremity Retained: Notes From the Death Metal Underground. Handshake, Inc. ISBN 978-1-631734-74-8.
- Purcell, Natalie J. (2003). Death Metal Music: The Passion and Politics of a Subculture. McFarland & Company. ISBN 978-0-7864-1585-4.
- Strother, Eric (2013). Unlocking the Paradox of Christian Metal Music (PhD thesis). University of Kentucky. p. 70, note 110.
- Swinford, Dean (2013). Death Metal Epic (Book I: The Inverted Katabasis). Atlatl Press. ISBN 978-0-9883484-3-1.
