= Sam Kinison =

American comedian (1953–1992)

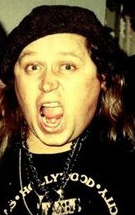
- Born: Samuel Burl Kinison; December 8, 1953; Yakima, Washington, U.S.
- Died: April 10, 1992 (aged 38); Needles, California, U.S.
- Resting place: Memorial Park Cemetery, Tulsa, Oklahoma, U.S.
- Occupations: Stand-up comedian; actor
- Spouses: Patricia Adkins (m. 1975; div. 1980) Terry Jean Marze (m. 1981; div. 1989) Malika Marie Souiri (m. 1992)
- Children: 1

Comedy career
- Years active: 1978–1992
- Genres: Comedy; satire; observational comedy
- Subjects: Human sexuality; current events; American politics; religion
- Website: samkinison.org

Samuel Burl Kinison (/ˈkɪnɪsən/ KIN-iss-ən; December 8, 1953 – April 10, 1992) was an American stand-up comedian and actor. A former Pentecostal preacher, he performed stand-up routines that were characterized by intense sudden tirades, punctuated with his distinctive scream. Initially performing for free, Kinison became a regular fixture at The Comedy Store, where he met and eventually befriended such comics as Robin Williams and Jim Carrey.

Kinison's comedy was observational humor, especially towards women and dating, and his popularity grew quickly, leading to appearances on The Tonight Show Starring Johnny Carson, Late Night with David Letterman, and Saturday Night Live. At the peak of his career in early 1992, he was killed in a car crash, aged 38. Despite his mediocre reception in his late career, his early stand up is widely considered groundbreaking. He is regarded as one of the most influential comics of all time.

Kinison received a Grammy nomination in 1988 for the single "Wild Thing" from his Have You Seen Me Lately? album, and a posthumous win in 1994 for Best Spoken Comedy Album, Live from Hell.

== Early life ==
Samuel Burl Kinison was born in Yakima, Washington, on December 8, 1953, the son of Marie Florence (née Morrow) and Samuel Earl Kinison, a Pentecostal preacher. The family moved to East Peoria, Illinois, when Kinison was three months old. At the age of three years, Kinison was hit by a truck, which left him with brain damage and epilepsy.

His father pastored several churches around the country, receiving little income. Kinison had two older brothers, Richard and Bill, and a younger brother, Kevin. His parents divorced when Kinison was 11, after which his brother Bill went to live with his father, while Kinison stayed with the rest of the family, despite his protests. Bill described this as the root of much of Sam's anger. Kinison later attended East Peoria Community High School in East Peoria.

Kinison and his brothers emulated their father by becoming Pentecostal preachers. Between 1968 and 1969, Kinison attended Pinecrest Bible Training Center, an interdenominational, unaccredited, three-year Bible school located in Salisbury Center, New York. His mother married another preacher and moved to Tulsa, Oklahoma, where Kinison lived for a while.

He preached from the age of 17 to 24 and recordings of his sermons reveal that he used a "fire and brimstone" style, punctuated with shouts similar to the ones he would later use in his stand-up routines. His brother Bill noted, "ironically, he had no stage presence", and he was not very successful at making money from preaching, as he was more concerned with making the sermons more informative than entertaining. After Kinison and his first wife divorced, he abandoned preaching and took up comedy.

== Career ==
Kinison began his career in Houston, where he performed in small clubs. He became a member of a comedic group at the Comedy Workshop, known as the Texas Outlaw Comics, that included Bill Hicks, Ron Shock, Riley Barber, Steve Epstein, Andy Huggins, John Farneti, and Jimmy Pineapple. Hicks cited Kinison as a major influence on his comedic style, noting, "He was the first guy I ever saw to go on stage and not in any way ask the audience to like him."

In 1980, Kinison moved to Los Angeles, hoping to find work at The Comedy Store. He was first employed as a doorman. He soon developed a cocaine and alcohol addiction, quickly progressing to freebasing cocaine, and struggled to gain a foothold in the business, until his brother Bill moved to Los Angeles to help manage his career.

In August 1985, his big break came on HBO's Rodney Dangerfield's Ninth Annual Young Comedians Special. After noting the performance of Bob Nelson, reviewer Stephen Holden of The New York Times wrote, "the most interesting of the other eight comedians is the savagely misogynistic Sam Kinison. Mr. Kinison specializes in a grotesque animalist howl that might be described as the primal scream of the married man."

In 1985, in Kinison's debut television appearance on Late Night with David Letterman, Letterman's introduction of Kinison warned his audience, "Brace yourselves. I'm not kidding. Please welcome Sam Kinison." Kinison played on his former role as a Bible-preaching evangelist, taking satirical and sacrilegious shots at the Bible, Christianity, and famous Christian evangelist scandals of his day. Kinison's daring comedy helped shoot him to stardom. On several videos of his stand-up routines, a shot of the personalized license plate on his 1986 Corvette reveals the words "EX REV". He was associated with the Los Angeles rock music scene and was occasionally accompanied by a touring band.

In 1986, Kinison appeared in Rodney Dangerfield's film Back to School.

Howard Stern purchased the film rights to Kinison's biography, written by Kinison's brother, reporting in 2008 that HBO would make Brother Sam with Kinison being played by Dan Fogler. In an interview with Sam's brother and manager Bill Kinison, Bill mentioned film deals that were in development at the time of his death; one such deal was a film with Arnold Schwarzenegger and another with Rick Moranis.

== Personal life ==
In May 1988, Kinison's youngest brother Kevin died by suicide at the age of 28; Kevin shot and killed himself after a nervous breakdown at his parents' home in Tulsa. His death devastated Sam.

Kinison acquired much of his material from his first two marriages, to Patricia Adkins (1975–1980) and Terry Marze (1981–1989). He began a relationship with dancer Malika Souiri toward the end of his marriage with Marze.

In 1990, Souiri alleged she was raped by a man Kinison had hired as a bodyguard while Kinison was asleep in the house. The bodyguard stated that the sex was consensual. The jury deadlocked in the subsequent trial, and the charges were later dropped. The incident inspired Kinison to try to go straight with Souiri and join an Alcoholics Anonymous chapter. By March 1990, he was saying to audiences that he was no longer getting high.

Kinison frequented rock shows and often hung out with musicians. In May 1991, Kinison got in a fight with guitarist Slash at a hotel after Slash missed a planned appearance at one of Kinison's shows. Slash stated that Kinison nearly "choked [him] to death" before Slash's bandmate Duff McKagan intervened. Slash and McKagan declined to press charges after the incident.

On April 4, 1992, six days before his death, Kinison married Souiri at the Candlelight Chapel in Las Vegas. They honeymooned in Hawaii for five days before returning home to Los Angeles on April 10 to prepare for a show that night at the Riverside Resort Hotel and Casino in Laughlin, Nevada.

Souiri sued Kinison's brother, Bill, in 1995 for allegedly defaming her in his book Brother Sam: The Short Spectacular Life of Sam Kinison. Souiri sued Bill Kinison a second time in 2009, alleging he forged Sam's will, but claiming she did not discover the fact until 2007.

In February 2011, the Toronto Sun reported that Kinison had fathered a child with the wife of his best friend and opening act, Carl LaBove, who had been paying child support for the girl for nearly 13 years. LaBove filed legal papers claiming the girl was Kinison's. DNA tests taken from Kinison's brother Bill show a 99.8% likelihood that Kinison was the father of the unnamed woman.

== Death ==
On April 10, 1992, Kinison was driving his Pontiac Turbo Trans Am on Needles Highway northwest of Needles, California, when his vehicle was struck head-on by a pickup truck driven by an intoxicated juvenile. The pickup truck crossed the center line of the roadway while trying to pass another vehicle and moved into Kinison's lane. Kinison and his wife were on their way to Laughlin, Nevada, to perform at a sold-out show at the Riverside Casino.

His head had smashed the windshield because he was not wearing his seat belt. His wife received a concussion in the collision, but later recovered after being taken directly to a hospital in Needles for treatment. Kinison's last words were reportedly stated as he was staring at something or someone, while in a diagonal position leaning on the middle console. His brother told him that some help was on the way. Kinison repeatedly said "Why now?", "But why?", and "I don't wanna die, I don't wanna die, I don't wanna die", like he was negotiating with someone, and, after another pause, said, "okay, okay, okay." Kinison died shortly after. He was 38 years old. His brother, who was with him, recalled, "Whatever voice was talking to him gave him the right answer and he just relaxed with it."

An autopsy found that Kinison sustained multiple traumatic injuries, including a dislocation in the cervical spine, a torn aorta, and torn blood vessels in his abdominal cavity, which resulted in his death within a few minutes of the crash.

The pickup truck driver pleaded guilty to one count of vehicular manslaughter with gross negligence and was sentenced to one year of probation and 300 hours of community service. He also had his driver's license suspended for two years in connection with the collision.

Kinison's funeral service was held on April 15, 1992, at Forest Lawn Memorial Park in Glendale, California. Kinison's body was buried in a family grave plot at Memorial Park Cemetery in Tulsa, Oklahoma. His gravestone is inscribed, "In another time and place, he would have been called prophet."

== Legacy ==
Comedian George Carlin's eighth HBO stand-up comedy special, Jammin' in New York, was dedicated to Kinison's memory. At the beginning of the broadcast, the words: "This show is for SAM" appeared on the screen.

After his death, Kinison was fondly remembered by his friends and costars. Ozzy Osbourne said:

Apparently when Sam had the accident, I heard he got out of the car and looked up to the heavens and said, 'I don't want to die,' and then just said, 'Oh, okay,' and laid down and died. It sounds crazy and will probably offend a lot of my fans, but I believe there's a higher power. Some people may think Sam Kinison's in one place, but I know where he is. He's upstairs; he's next to God.

On May 23, 1993, FOX aired a special, A Tribute to Sam Kinison. The special contained archival footage of Kinison and stand-up comedy performances by comedians including Robin Williams, Rodney Dangerfield, and Jim Carrey.

Between 2008 and 2013, some press releases indicated a possible dramatic film to be based on the memoir Brother Sam: The Short, Spectacular Life of Sam Kinison, by Kinison's brother Bill Kinison and Steve Delsohn.

Kinison's comedy was at times accused of containing misogyny and homophobia, according to a retrospective on Kinison's career in the Los Angeles Times. For example, the group Queer Nation Nebraska demonstrated on a sidewalk in front of a Kinison show in Lincoln in February 1991, chanting "Antiwoman, antigay, Sam Kinison, go away!"

His Have You Seen Me Lately? album carried a disclaimer sticker stating, "The Material On This Album Does Not Reflect The Views Or Opinions Of Warner Bros. Records." Employees at Warner Brothers requested that their bosses not release it due to the controversial material on Kinison's first album.

In a 2016 article by John Hugar in New York, Hugar contended that the comedy of past comedians, including Kinison, was not positively embraced by younger generations, perhaps because their material has come to be viewed as anachronistically sexist and misogynistic with time. Hugar noted that a modern reevaluation was complicated by the possibility that Kinison could be considered as playing an intentionally shocking character rather than speaking as himself.

== Discography ==
=== Albums ===
- Louder Than Hell (1986)
- Breaking The Rules (1987)
- Have You Seen Me Lately? (1988) - RIAA: Gold
- Leader of the Banned (1990)
- Live from Hell (1993)

=== Singles ===
List of singles, with selected chart positions
Title	Year	Peak chart positions	Album
Title	Year	AUS	Album
"Wild Thing"	1988	19	Have You Seen Me Lately?

== Filmography ==
=== Film ===
- Savage Dawn (1985)
- Back to School (1986)
- Three Amigos (1986) (scenes deleted)
- Pauly Shore Is Dead (2004) (archive footage)
- I Am Sam Kinison (2017) (documentary)

=== Television ===
- Rodney Dangerfield Hosts the 9th Annual Young Comedians Special (1985)
- Saturday Night Live (1985–1986, guest performer; 1986, host)
- Rodney Dangerfield: It's Not Easy Bein' Me (1986)
- Rodney Dangerfield: Opening Night at Rodney's Place (1989, guest star)
- Married... with Children (1989, guest star)
- Tales from the Crypt (1990, guest star)
- Charlie Hoover (1991, as Hugh)
- In Living Color (Season 3, Episode 7, closing skit, Sunday, Nov. 3, 1991)
- Fox New Year's Eve Live: 1992 (1991–1992, co-host)

=== Other appearances and music videos ===
- Live in a Rusted Out Garage concert video, Neil Young (1986) (Extended Cameo)
- Breaking the Rules (1987) (HBO Special)
- "Wild Thing" music video, Sam Kinison (1988)
- "Bad Medicine" music video, Bon Jovi (1988) (Cameo)
- "Under My Thumb" music video, Sam Kinison (1989)
- "Kickstart My Heart" music video, Mötley Crüe (1989) (Cameo)
- "The Kids Goes Wild" music video, Babylon A.D. (1989) (Voice Over)
- "The Walk" music video, Cherry St. (1989) (Cameo)
- "Mississippi Queen" music video, Sam Kinison (1990)
- "Heartbeat" music video, D'Priest (1990) (Cameo)
- "What Do I Have to Do" music video, Kylie Minogue (1991) (Voice Over)
- Family Entertainment Hour (1991)
- Unleashed (2006) Sam Kinison Banned Live at Felt Forum NYC 1990
