= Welcome to Hell =

Studio album by Venom
- Released: December 1981
- Recorded: August 1981
- Studios: Impulse Studios, Newcastle
- Genres: Speed metal; heavy metal; black metal
- Length: 39:26
- Label: Neat
- Producers: Keith Nichol and Venom

Venom chronology
Welcome to Hell (1981)	Black Metal (1982)

Singles from Welcome to Hell
- 1. "In League with Satan" Released: 17 April 1981

Welcome to Hell is the debut studio album by English heavy metal band Venom, released in December 1981 through Neat Records. After various line-up changes and recording several demo tapes in Impulse Studios, Venom gained success and attention with the single "In League with Satan"; their dark, Satanic image; and their fast, raw sound. The band re-recorded all of the demos' songs, which Neat Records released as an album.

Released during the peak of new wave of British heavy metal movement, Welcome to Hell was initially panned by critics. It later became recognised as an album seminal to the development of the then-nascent extreme metal scene and one of the most influential metal albums of all time. The album was re-released by Sanctuary Records in 2002.

== Background ==
Venom's original personnel came from three different bands: Guillotine, Oberon and Dwarfstar. In 1979, Conrad "Cronos" Lant applied for a job at Impulse Studios in Wallsend as an audio-visual engineer for Neat Records. Impulse would soon become the epicentre for a series of vital recordings from the new wave of British heavy metal movement on the Neat Records label. Lant trained as an assistant engineer and tape operator at the time, working with local bands while simultaneously playing guitar in a band named Album Graecum, which later became Dwarfstar. Lant was soon introduced to Jeffrey Dunn, who at the time was playing guitar for a Judas Priest cover band named Guillotine, and quickly struck up a friendship around their shared vision for creating a "mega-satanic band" who played dark, demonic music and used Satanic imagery. Dunn introduced Lant to his band, and Lant would soon leave Dwarfstar and join Guillotine, where he met drummer Tony Bray during their first rehearsal. Lant would find himself now playing rhythm guitar in a five-piece consisting of Clive Archer on vocals, Alan Winston on bass, Dunn on lead guitar and Bray on drums. The band would soon change their name to Venom after a suggestion by the band's roadie.

== Writing and recording ==
Many of the earliest recordings of songs from the album were written by guitarist Jeffrey Dunn before eventual vocalist and bassist Conrad Lant even joined the band in November 1979. Lant introduced them to his original song ideas as he did not want to keep playing the same cover songs, and with Dunn he began writing new songs for the band. Lant had composed songs like "Sons of Satan", "Bloodlust" and "Welcome to Hell", while Dunn had composed songs like "Angel Dust", "Red Light Fever", "Buried Alive", "Raise the Dead" and "Live Like an Angel (Die Like a Devil)". Dunn and Lant redefined together these songs with a mutual collaboration and then, after unsuccessfully trying to convince the managing director at Impulse Studios where Lant was working at the time as a tape operator to allow Venom studio time to record, Lant decided to record one of the bands church hall rehearsals on a basic cassette recorder in late 1979 with original vocalist Clive Archer on vocals, Alan Winston on bass, Lant and Dunn on guitar and Bray on drums. They performed the tracks: "Angel Dust", "Red Light Fever", "Buried Alive", "Raise The Dead" and the band song "Venom". Unfortunately, as the band rehearsed in an old church hall, the sound was not very good.

"So one day at our Church Hall rehearsals I set up an old crappy cassette player and recorded our rehearsal, it was terrible, the hall was way to big, and so the recordings sounded really distant and booming, a right racket, but anyway I played it to everyone at the studio and they hated it, and not surprising as the big church hall reverb didn't do justice to our sound, and we sounded terrible." — Lant

In February 1980, Winston left the band less than a week before they were to play their first show at the Meth in Wallsend on 15 February 1980. Lant then took over bass guitar duties and soon after the band also decided on using stage names since they felt singing songs about Satanism and the occult with ordinary names did not feel right. The band settled on more formidable and demonic names to better fit their images and their stage personalities. Archer becoming "Jesus Christ", Lant "Cronos", Bray "Abbadon" and Dunn "Mantas". After failing to win over the studio with their church hall rehearsals, Lant was able to convince studio engineer Mickey Sweeney to work a short recording session with the band (for free under the condition that Lant stay back every night in the studio and help him with other sessions) and even managed to persuade record company boss David Wood to get half a day in the studio for free. The recording session took place on 19 April 1980 and the band recorded three tracks: "Angel Dust", "Raise The Dead" and "Red Light Fever". Lant then made cassette copies of the 3 songs and sent them to various record companies, radio stations, music magazines and rock clubs. This demo tape is entitled Demon.

"Soon after I came up with the idea of trying to convince the engineer (Mickey Sweeney) to work a short session for free if I'd stay back every night in the studio and help him with other sessions, he agreed, so I now just had to try to persuade the studio boss (Dave Wood) to give me a few hours for free also, again agreeing to do all sorts of extra [unpaid] work around the studio. Eventually, he agreed and this was when I finally got 4 hours session time so we could record the 3 track demo, at last we had a good-ish quality recording our ourselves to play to the world, and I made as many copies as I could to mail out to all sorts of labels and magazines, and one mag in particular was 'Sounds Magazine', which one of the editors; Geoff Barton decided to put all 3 tracks in his weekly play list, and for a few weeks running, he claimed he loved them so much he didn't want 3 different artists like the other journalists put in their play lists, he put all 3 of our songs from the demo tape." — Lant

After some minor attention from local magazines in the summer of 1980 the band returned to the studio after some talks with their label; Neat Records, and it was decided that due to the high amount of volume of bands looking to record at the time the label would put an affordable deal together called the "£50 Demos" allowing each band 4 hours in the studio to record as many live songs as possible straight to 2 track master for £50. However, Lant was unable to get the money, so he again agreed to work long hours in the studio to pay for the session. Once given the go ahead, Lant brought the band in on 10 October 1980 and began recording. Out of the 4 hour session the band recorded 6 tracks: "Sons Of Satan", "In League with Satan", "Angel Dust", "Live Like an Angel", "Schizo" (later retitled "Schizoid") and the band song "Venom". It was during this recording session that Lant was asked to sing lead vocals on "Live Like an Angel", and his bandmates, so impressed by his performance, decided to make Lant their new lead vocalist and Clive Archer was soon let go.

"When it was time to record Live Like An Angel Jeff asked me if I'd have a go singing it, I said "Hell Yeah", although at the end of the session we had a band meeting and the guitarist and drummer said that they preferred my vocal style to Clive's. I must say he was very big about the whole situation even though he had in reality just been sacked, he said we could keep his PA for me to sing through, and his parting words were something like; 'I fucking love this band, I really hope you guys make it."— Lant

Venom thus became a trio, with "Cronos" on vocals and bass, "Mantas" on guitar and "Abaddon" on drums. After convincing Neat Records to take a chance and let Venom record a single, the band headed back to the studio in January 1981 and released their first professional recording material, a vinyl, 7" single titled In League with Satan / Live Like an Angel on 19 April 1981, one year to the day that the band recorded their first demo, Demon. Neat Records, impressed with the success and reception of the single, asked the band to record all their material. Venom once again returned to Impulse studios in August and over the course of only three days re-recorded all of the material they had, however, the label decided to release these re-recorded demos, unpolished and with little production values. The final product being the band's debut album Welcome to Hell, a collection of demos packaged with a cover.

== Music and lyrics ==
This is the alpha and the omega; the yang to Iron Maiden’s yin; the end of the NWOBHM; the beginning of thrash, death, and black metal; the album that changed the face of heavy metal, possibly in more ways than any single LP other than Black Sabbath’s Paranoid. Three wackos from Newcastle thought the sound of Motörhead, the visuals of Kiss, and subject matter only hinted at by Black Sabbath would make the perfect ingredients for the perfect rock ‘n’ roll holocaust. [...] Welcome to Hell is the sound of heavy metal throwing out the rule book and adopting the attitude of punk – but if there was anything they didn’t like about punk, they threw that out, too.

— Invisible Oranges (September 8, 2011)

Welcome to Hell features fast tempos, sloppy musicianship and a raw, heavily distorted sound rooted in traditional heavy metal, punk rock and speed metal that was integral on the development of thrash, death, black metal and other forms of extreme metal. According to Invisible Oranges: "Abaddon’s barbaric 'drums and nuclear warheads' seem to be less a case of him not being able to play and more that, in true punk rock fashion, he just didn’t care. He was there to enjoy himself in the revelry, not to anxiously brood over the specifics of performance. Much of what he disgorges here seems musically quite appropriate; it’s just the execution is a bit sloppy."

Lyrically, the songs explore themes such as hedonism, perversion ("Live Like an Angel (Die Like a Devil)", "1000 Days in Sodom", "Red Light Fever", "Poison"), serial killing ("Schizoid"), substance abuse ("Angel Dust"), witchcraft ("Witching Hour") and Satanism ("Welcome to Hell", "In League with Satan"). Two tracks contain use of Biblical scripture, with the title track featuring a female voice reciting an extract from Psalm 23 and "1000 Days in Sodom" telling the story of the Biblical city of Sodom and the prevailing depravity and degradation as the city and its inhabitants are destroyed for their sins. The track "In League with Satan" opens with a reversed recording of a demonic-sounding voice using the backmasking technique. When played in reverse, the voice of Lant can be heard saying "Satan, raised in hell, I'm gonna burn your soul, crush your bones, I'm gonna make you bleed, you gonna bleed for me". This is one of the earliest instances of Satanic subliminal messages in music.

== Artwork ==
The Sigil of Baphomet, a symbol used as the insignia of the Church of Satan

The album cover, designed by drummer Tony Bray, adapted the same graphics for the cover of the single "In League with Satan" / "Live Like an Angel", with different print colours (golden instead of white) and different text. The artwork appears on a black background, with a large golden circular pentacle containing the head of the Goat of Mendes, a stylised Baphomet with a fierce expression; above that is the band logo "Venom" and under the title of the disc in gothic characters. The five-pointed star is in turn circumscribed by two concentric circles; in the space between the two circumferences there are five Hebrew letters, each corresponding to a point on the star which takes on the value of Belial, Leviathan, Lucifer, Satan, indicating Earth, Water, Air, Fire; plus the southern tip which represents man. On the back cover is a photo of the band holding axes on Tynemouth beach near Newcastle. In the very first copies of the disc, a black and white mini-poster of the group was also included.

== Release and promotion ==
The album was released in December 1981 by Neat Records in the United Kingdom. Early copies included a pink lyric sheet and a black and white mini-poster depicting the Venom members. The logo of the record company on the various vinyl LP prints varies in colour, ranging from silver to blue, green, white and red.

While promoting the album, stories of the bands chaotic shows that they were playing in old church halls became well known to locals. Because of this, the band was granted an opportunity to play a show at a sports hall called Maecke Blyde in Poperinge, Belgium. Lant, wanting to get away from the UK to see what the response would be to the band from fans who knew nothing of them, jumped at the chance. The concert took place on 4 June 1982 and was attended by over 3,000 fans, and after a successful show in Poperinge the band now set their sights on the United States.

== Reception and legacy ==
Professional ratings
Review scores
Source	Rating
AllMusic	4.5/5 stars
Collector's Guide to Heavy Metal	6/10
Sounds	5/5 stars

The album has received varied critical responses both at the time of its release and since. British journalist Geoff Barton stated in his 1981 five-star review of Welcome to Hell that the album had "the hi-fi dynamics of a 50-year-old pizza", and that it "brought a new meaning to the word 'cataclysmic'". According to AllMusic journalist Eduardo Rivadavia, highlights of the album include "Welcome to Hell", "In League with Satan", "One Thousand Days in Sodom" and "Witching Hour"; Rivadavia said of "Witching Hour": "Possibly Venom's single most important track, in it you'll hear a number of stylistic devices which would later pervade all extreme metal genres, indeed become their most regularly abused clichés." Canadian journalist Martin Popoff wrote that "Welcome to Hell got a certain fabulously stupid impetus to it, despite the sub-bootleg quality recording, and Cronos quickly establishing himself as the most annoying voice in rock"; it should be considered "a record of historical metal relevance", but "not the band's most listenable product".

Despite critical backlash, the album is now regarded as one of the most influential metal albums ever released, and as being seminal in the creation of extreme metal. Due to its unpolished sound as a result of it being recorded in only three days, author Dayal Patterson stated that the relatively low-fidelity of Welcome to Hell inspired numerous Norwegian metal bands, who considered it black metal. Patterson says that Welcome to Hell and Black Metal were both the genesis for the black metal genre, with the earlier album "where it was born."

In the 2013 book Louder Than Hell, Scott Ian of Anthrax is quoted as follows regarding his memories of hearing the album for the first time: "For me and all my friends, Welcome to Hell was our first exposure to Venom, and it was a huge eye-opener. It was one of those 'holy shit' records. Like, 'Jesus Christ, listen to this, these guys are fucking insane. There were songs like 'Sons of Satan' and the title track. It was so, so evil. This was a new kind of insanity."

In 2013, Decibel ranked Welcome to Hell at number 26 on its list of the Top 100 Black Metal Albums of All Time. In 2017, Rolling Stone placed it at number 74 on its list of "The 100 Greatest Metal Albums of All Time."

The black metal band Mayhem derived their name from the instrumental track "Mayhem with Mercy".

== Track listing ==
All tracks are written by Bray/Dunn/Lant.

Side A
No.	Title	Length
1.	"Sons of Satan"	3:38
2.	"Welcome to Hell"	3:15
3.	"Schizoid"	3:34
4.	"Mayhem with Mercy"	0:58
5.	"Poison"	4:33
6.	"Live Like an Angel (Die Like a Devil)"	3:59

Side B
No.	Title	Length
7.	"Witching Hour"	3:40
8.	"One Thousand Days in Sodom"	4:36
9.	"Angel Dust"	2:43
10.	"In League with Satan"	3:35
11.	"Red Light Fever"	5:14

Bonus tracks in 1985 re-release by Combat Records
No.	Title	Length
12.	"In Nomine Satanas"	3:28
13.	"Bursting Out"	2:56

Bonus tracks in 2002 re-release by Castle/Sanctuary
No.	Title	Length
12.	"Angel Dust" (Lead Weight version)	3:03
13.	"In League with Satan" (7-inch version)	3:31
14.	"Live Like an Angel" (7-inch version)	3:54
15.	"Bloodlust" (7-inch version)	2:59
16.	"In Nomine Satanas" (7-inch version)	3:31
17.	"Angel Dust" (Demo)	3:10
18.	"Raise the Dead" (Demo)	3:29
19.	"Red Light Fever" (Demo)	4:51
20.	"Welcome to Hell" (Demo)	4:57
21.	"Bitch Witch" (Out-take)	3:08
22.	"Snots Shit" (Out-take)	2:06

== Credits ==
- Venom – producer
  - Conrad "Cronos" Lant – bass, vocals
  - Jeffrey "Mantas" Dunn – guitars
  - Tony "Abaddon" Bray – drums, artwork
- Keith Nichol – producer, engineer
