= Texas Outlaw Comics =

Group of comedians

The Texas Outlaw Comics were a group of comedians based in Houston, Texas in the mid-1980s. Formed at the Comedy Workshop comedy club in Houston, early members included Sam Kinison, Bill Hicks, Ron Shock, Steve Epstein, Carl LaBove, John S, Riley Barber, Dan Merryman, John Farnetti, and Jimmy Pineapple. Other members included Andy Huggins and Steven Juliano Moore. Epstein said, "We're looking for people who speak their minds, whose comedy comes from themselves–the people who aren't interested in selling out." American Scream: The Bill Hicks Story. HarperCollins, ISBN 9780380803774

They chose and trademarked their name because Sam Kinison was using the term "Outlaw" to brand his own act, and Epstein felt that Kinison owed him money he had not been paid. Their first taped special under the name Texas Outlaw Comics was for Houston NBC affiliate KPRC-TV.
