= Leader of the Banned =

Live album by Sam Kinison
- Released: 1990
- Genre: Stand-up comedy; glam metal
- Label: Warner Bros.

Sam Kinison chronology
Have You Seen Me Lately? (1988)	Leader of the Banned (1990)	Live From Hell (1993)

Professional ratings
Review scores
Source	Rating
Allmusic	2/5 stars

Leader of the Banned is the third Sam Kinison comedy album released in 1990. The first side consists of stand-up comedy, and the second side consists of covers of classic rock songs by bands such as AC/DC, Mountain, Cheap Trick, and The Rolling Stones.

== Track listing ==
Side A
No.	Title	Length
1.	"Detox This"
2.	"Shopping for Pets"
3.	"Sex, Videotape and Zoo Animals"
4.	"Jerry's Bastard Kid"
5.	"Lenny Bruce's Mom"
6.	"Casual Users of Terrorism"
7.	"Old People Must Die"
8.	"Grilled Cheese Sandwich"
9.	"Phone Call from Hell"
Total length:		33:01

Side B
No.	Title	Length
10.	"Gonna Raise Hell" (Cheap Trick cover)	4:18
11.	"Mississippi Queen" (Mountain cover)	4:06
12.	"Under My Thumb" (The Rolling Stones cover)	3:52
13.	"Highway to Hell" (AC/DC cover)	3:56

== Musicians ==
Credits from Allmusic.

- Jimmy Bain - bass
- Michael Baird - drums
- David Bryan - piano
- Kim Bullard - keyboards, background vocals
- Tony Clark-Stewart - bagpipes
- Lanny Cordola - guitar, background vocals
- Jody Cortez - drums
- Fred Coury - drums
- David Cumming - background vocals
- C.C. DeVille - guitar
- Gary Falcone - background vocals
- Michael Fiore - background vocals
- Tommy Funderburk - background vocals
- Robert Irving - background vocals
- Randy Jackson - bass
- Bobby Leigh - background vocals
- Vinnie Ludovico - drums
- Eddie Money - background vocals
- Joe Pizzulo - background vocals
- Robert Sarzo - guitar
- Rudy Sarzo - bass
- Slash - guitar
- Billy Trudell - background vocals
- Leslie West - bass, guitar
- Harald Wiik - background vocals
- Swerre Wiik - background vocals
- Richie Wise - background vocals
- Chuck Wright - background vocals
- Dweezil Zappa - guitar
- Richie Zito - background vocals, producer
