= Brandon Geist =

Brandon Geist is an American music journalist who serves as editor-in-chief for Revolver. He is featured in the book Louder Than Hell.
