= Ron Shock =

American stand-up comedian (1942–2012)

- Born: Howard Ronald Shock; October 19, 1942; Albuquerque, New Mexico
- Died: May 17, 2012 (aged 69); Las Vegas, Nevada
- Occupation: Comedian
- Years active: 1982–2012

Howard Ronald "Ron" Shock (October 19, 1942 – May 17, 2012) was an American comedian and storyteller who was best known for his reenactments of stories that he extracted from newspapers.

== Early life ==
Shock was born in Albuquerque, New Mexico. According to his website biography, Shock had been "a many great things" throughout his childhood, including a student of the priesthood, member of a chain gang, jewel thief, prison inmate, vice president of Macmillan Publishers, and an inventor with three patents in electronics. "One went on to become Quick Alert," Shock said to the Salt Lake City Weekly. "I sold it for $15,000, and the guy I sold it to made millions. In financial circles, I'm called a !@#$%^& idiot."

== Career ==
Shock began his comedy career at age 40, playing the Improv in Los Angeles, a gig that ultimately helped lead to his Showtime special Bad Gig Blues. But it was on one of those Improv shows that Shock got his big break on The Tonight Show Starring Johnny Carson.

As I came offstage, a man stood up out of the audience and grabbed my hand and said, 'I'm Jim McCauley, and I book The Tonight Show,' Shock said in his laid-back Texas drawl. McCauley was charged with reviewing the final sets of all the comics who appeared on The Tonight Show, but he hadn't actually seen the show because he and Shock wound up getting drunk together. 'Jim says to me, 'Are you gonna be funny?' I said, 'I'm gonna kill, Jim.' So we drank some more and then went home.

Shock formed the legendary Texas Outlaw Comics with his friends Riley Barber, Jimmy Pineapple, Andy Huggins, Steve Epstein, John Farnetti, and Bill Hicks. "There are about 60 people out there that claim to have been 'Outlaws', but they're lying," said Shock, adding that the group is also often confused with Sam Kinison's Outlaws of Comedy. "It got to the point where I don't even use that as a résumé item."

Shock's blend of stand-up comedy and storytelling, which he referred to as "comedy from a life fully lived", made him a favorite at comedy clubs across the country as well as on such television shows as Comic Strip Live, Comedy on the Road, and his own Showtime special, Bad Gig Blues. He toured 40 weeks per year throughout the U.S. And Canada.

Shock's success culminated in a one-man show in Los Angeles called The Storyteller. Billed as a "concert of stories," it featured Shock backed by musicians Kenny Moore and jazz guitarist Scott May (of the Grammy award-winning rock bands Ides of March and Survivor), who performed original music. "The show was critically acclaimed and sparsely attended," joked Shock.

== Personal life ==
In 1998, Shock's longtime girlfriend, Ellen Herrington, was in a devastating car accident, and Shock had to briefly quit his comedy career to care for her. After Herrington's death around 2002, Shock moved to Las Vegas, where he played poker, resumed his career onstage, and created his own website, RonShock.com. "The feeling I had when I first walked back onto a stage," said Shock, "was how glad I was to be there. It's more than what I do; it's who I am."

Shock married his wife Rhonda in 2002, and went back to touring 10 to 20 weeks per year, although the demand permitted him to be nearly as busy as he was in his heyday. Shock had done a reunion show with the Houston comics and headlined on the Las Vegas Strip on his 65th birthday. "Gotta love that!" Shock later quipped. On October 15, 2011, Shock conducted a comprehensive audio interview with Music Life Radio about his life and career. As Marc Maron put it on his WTF podcast interview, Ron Shock was an important influence on modern stand-up comedy.

On December 14, 2011, Shock was diagnosed with urethral cancer, a rare, aggressive form of cancer that does not respond well to conventional treatment. He died from the disease on May 17, 2012.
