= Pinecrest Bible Training Center =

Pinecrest Bible Training Center is an interdenominational, unaccredited, three-year Bible school in Chesapeake, Virginia, USA. It was founded by Wade Taylor in 1968 in Salisbury Center, New York, and relocated to Virginia in 2013. The comedian Sam Kinison attended Pinecrest for the academic year 1968–1969.
