= Have You Seen Me Lately? =

Live album by Sam Kinison
- Released: 1988
- Genre: Stand-up comedy
- Length: 49:50
- Label: Warner Bros.

Sam Kinison chronology
Louder Than Hell (1986)	Have You Seen Me Lately? (1988)	Leader of the Banned (1990)

Professional ratings
Review scores
Source	Rating
AllMusic	4/5 stars

Have You Seen Me Lately? is the second stand-up album by American comedian Sam Kinison, released in 1988. The final track, a cover of the song Wild Thing by The Troggs, was nominated for the Grammy Award for Best Comedy Album at the 32nd Annual Grammy Awards.

== Track listing ==
The album contains the following tracks:

1. "Rock Against Drugs?" (5:06)
2. "Rubber Love" (3:46)
3. "The Story of Jim (Bakker)" (3:53)
4. "Robo-Pope" (3:28)
5. "Mother Mary's Mystery Date" (1:50)
6. "Jesus the Miracle Caterer" (1:16)
7. "Heart-Stoppers" (1:49)
8. "Buddies" (3:11)
9. "Lesbians Are Our Friends" (7:17)
10. "Pocket Toys" (2:04)
11. "Sexual Diaries" (3:40)
12. "The Butt and the Bible" (3:25)
13. "Parties with the Dead" (4:40)
14. "Wild Thing" (4:25)

== Certifications ==
Region	Certification	Certified units/sales
United States (RIAA)	Gold	500,000^{^}
^{^} Shipments figures based on certification alone.
