= Revolver (magazine) =

Bi-monthly rock and heavy metal magazine

- Cover of the Spring 2024 issue, featuring Maynard James Keenan
- Editor in Chief: Brandon Geist
- Categories: Music magazine
- Frequency: Bi-monthly
- Circulation: 100,000
- Founder: Tom Beaujour; Brad Tolinski
- First issue: Spring 2000
- Company: Veeps
- Country: United States
- Language: English
- Website: revolvermag.com
- ISSN: 1527-408X

Revolver is an American heavy metal music and hard rock magazine. It was originally launched under Harris Publications in the spring of 2000 by Tom Beaujour and Brad Tolinski, who envisioned it as an American version of Mojo. After five issues, it was relaunched in late 2001 with a focus on heavy music. The magazine features both established acts and up-and-comers in heavy music. As of 2026, the publication is owned by Veeps, a subsidiary of Live Nation.

== Publication history ==
Revolver was originally conceived by Tom Beaujour and Brad Tolinski, whom both had experience working for the Harris Publications magazine Guitar World. Beaujour was hired by Tolinski as an intern at the magazine in 1993, later becoming its managing editor, before quitting on January 1, 1998, to pursue touring with a band he was in. A year later, Beajour quit his band and was re-hired by Tolinski to do some freelancing work for Guitar World, at which point they began discussing the idea of Revolver magazine, which they envisioned it as an American version of Mojo. Beaujour claimed that Harris Publications involvement in the magazine was "a legitimate reward" for Tolinski, as he had, by extension of turning Guitar World into a successful publication, "[taken] Harris from a ghetto place that did crossword puzzle books to a serious [business]."

Revolver's first issue, featuring Jim Morrison on the cover, was published in the spring of 2000 with the tagline "The World's Most Wanted Music Magazine". The original version of the magazine did not sell well, and was cancelled by Harris after the publication of its fifth issue in May/June 2001. Beaujour and Tolinski later attributed a lack of direction, both editorially and with its writers, and the costs of its writers as contributing factors to the publication's initial downfall. Despite this, Harris liked the magazine's name and was reluctant to end its publication. The publisher suggested turning it into a quarterly classic rock magazine, to which Tolinski pushed for it going in a harder direction towards heavy metal, feeling it would be cheaper and have a more focused audience. Beaujour stated: "We talked about it a lot. Classic rock is starting to falter in the newsstand world. We learned that at Revolver and at Guitar World. So we decided to make it metal." After agreeing its new direction, Tolinski departed the magazine and Beaujour moved from its executive editor to its editor-in-chief.

The relaunched, metal-focused Revolver launched with its September/October 2001 issue featuring Slipknot on the cover, now bearing the tagline "The World's Loudest Rock Magazine". According to Beaujor, "It sold. It sold well." From 2001 until 2016, Pantera and Hellyeah drummer Vinnie Paul wrote an advice column in the magazine. Lacuna Coil vocalist Cristina Scabbia began writing an advice column for the magazine from 2005 onwards, something she credited to Lamb of God vocalist Randy Blythe.

In March 2006, Harris sold the magazine to Future US, Inc. for US$4 million. At the point of sale, the magazine had gross profits of $500,000 from a turnover of $3.7 million. In 2012, Future plc sold Revolver to NewBay Media. In May 2017, Revolver was bought by Project M Group LLC. In the third quarter of that year, the magazine underwent a brand relaunch, including a redesigned print edition and website, intended to embody the art and culture of heavy music. Veeps purchased the magazine in 2024 or 2025.

Nearly all of the publication's staff were laid off in August 2026.

== Epiphone Revolver Music Awards ==
The Epiphone Revolver Golden Gods Music Awards is an annual awards ceremony established in 2009 by Revolver magazine. Originally called the Revolver Golden God Awards they went on hiatus in 2015 and came back in 2016.

== Hottest Chicks in Hard Rock ==
From 2006 until 2017, Revolver annually published a feature/issue/calendar of the "Hottest Chicks in Hard Rock" (known as "Hottest Chicks in Metal" until 2011). Conceived by then-Revolver editor-in-chief Tom Beaujour, the first edition of the feature (titled "The 13 Sexiest Chicks in Metal"), published in March 2006, became the second best-selling issue in the magazine's history behind their March 2005 Dimebag Darrell tribute issue. It would serve as the inspiration for the "Hottest Chick in Metal" award at the Golden God Awards (until it was removed in 2011), as well the "Hottest Chicks in Hard Rock Tour", from 2011 until 2015. The feature was last published in Revolver's April/May 2017 issue, after which it was discontinued following the magazine's acquisition by Project M Group.

Because Revolver did not feature many female acts in their magazine outside of the feature (at the time), several publications and commentators perceived the feature as, and frequently criticized it for being, sexist in its portrayal of women in rock and metal. Metal Edge (2006) and Decibel (2012) produced their own one-off issues covering women in metal in response to the feature. In February 2010, Angela Gossow, then-vocalist of Arch Enemy and a former participant in the feature, criticized Revolver for featuring an image she did not want used in the 2010 "Hottest Chicks" feature, and called it "an embarrassment for female musicians, who actually are musicians." Revolver argued that the "Hottest Chicks" feature was empowering to women; in 2011, editor Brandon Geist responded to criticism of the feature by claiming that because the women who appeared in the feature did so voluntarily, critics were being "extremely condescending to the women involved to act as if YOU know better than they do what is right for THEM". Kim Kelly, writing for The Atlantic, criticized Geist's response as avoiding and trivialising the problem addressed by his critics.
