= Louder Than Hell (Sam Kinison album) =

Live album by Sam Kinison
- Released: 1986
- Genre: Stand-up comedy
- Length: 42:05
- Label: Warner Bros.

Sam Kinison chronology
Louder Than Hell (1986)	Have You Seen Me Lately? (1988)

Professional ratings
Review scores
Source	Rating
AllMusic	4.5/5 stars

Louder Than Hell is the debut comedy album from American stand-up comedian and actor Sam Kinison, released in 1986.

== Track listing ==
The album contained the following tracks:

1. Blind (3:27)
2. Big Menu (2:59)
3. Libya (2:44)
4. Relationships (6:35)
5. Alphabet (3:19)
6. Sexual Therapy (2:43)
7. Manson (2:44)
8. Jesus (4:58)
9. Devil (4:27)
10. World Hunger (4:07)
11. Letter from Home (1:28)
12. Love Song (2:34)
