= Live from Hell =

Live From Hell

Live album by Sam Kinison
- Released: 1993
- Recorded: Houston, Texas
- Genre: Stand-up comedy
- Length: 53:56
- Label: Priority

Sam Kinison chronology
Leader of the Banned (1990)	Live From Hell (1993)

Professional ratings
Review scores
Source	Rating
AllMusic	3/5 stars
PopMatters	(unfavorable)

Live From Hell is the fourth and final comedy album by Sam Kinison. It was released in 1993, a year after his death in an automobile accident. The album won the Grammy Award for Best Spoken Comedy Album.

== Track listing ==
The album contained the following tracks:

1. I Missed the Joan Rivers Show (5:51)
2. Execution for Pee Wee (1:21)
3. Captain Kangaroo (3:19)
4. Russians Are Losers (1:50)
5. Sammy's Pawnshop (2:08)
6. J.F.K. (1:30)
7. Space Pussies (1:28)
8. The Kurds (2:43)
9. Willie Nelson (1:24)
10. The Smart Bomb (2:26)
11. 100 Hour War (3:32)
12. Bob Hope (1:20)
13. The Pee Trough (2:47)
14. Know When to Die (0:59)
15. Sam's Tirade (1:16)
16. Rap Sucks (4:56)
17. Cable T.V. (1:48)
18. Bad Taste (2:41)
19. The Homeless (5:28)
20. Don't Swallow (5:09)
