= Louder Than Hell (book) =

Louder Than Hell: The Definitive Oral History of Metal is a music history book written by Jon Weiderhorn of Loudwire and Katerine Truman, published by It Books on May 14, 2013. It details the history of heavy metal and includes quotes from numerous musicians from within the genre. The book has entire chapters focused upon different movements from within the genre, including thrash metal, death metal, black metal, grindcore, crossover thrash, nu metal, metalcore and deathcore.
