= Andy Huggins =

American stand-up comedian (born February 4, 1950)

- Born: February 4, 1950 (age 76)
- Website: www.oldmanhuggins.com

Andy Huggins (born February 4, 1950) is an American stand-up comedian. He gained public notability after his comedy went viral on the internet, particularly his comedy about old age. He also appeared on America's Got Talent in 2018.

== Career ==
Huggins was born in 1949 or 1950, grew up in Virginia, and began his comedy career in the 1970s, performing in comedy clubs in Los Angeles, where he met Bill Hicks. Hicks encouraged Huggins to move to Houston, where he would perform frequently during the 1980s, as well as participating in plays for Company OnStage in the 1990s.

Huggins appeared on America's Got Talent in season 13. He did not proceed far in the season, but Huggins stated that it did improve his career opportunities.

Huggins' comedy has gained him significant success in the 2020s. In 2025, Huggins released The Early Bird Special on Apple TV.
