= Samael discography =

- Studio albums: 10
- EPs: 5
- Soundtrack albums: 0
- Live albums: 2
- Compilation albums: 6
- Tribute albums: 0
- Singles: 0
- Music videos: 13
- Other: 4

Samael (/ˈsæməˌɛl/) is a Swiss extreme metal band formed in Sion in 1987. Their current lineup includes founding members and brothers Vorphalack (Vorph) and Xytraguptor (Xy), guitarist Drop and bassist Ales.

Samael is known to incorporate metal, industrial, electronic and symphonic music into their sound and mix it with massive beats, martial rhythms and up-tempo or blast beat. One of the key elements that distinguishes Samael from traditional metal bands is the use of a drum machine in studio and live on stage.

== Albums ==
Title	Album details	Peak chart positions			Sales
Title	Album details	SWI	FRA	GER	Sales
Worship Him	Released: 1 April 1991; Label: Osmose Productions; Formats: CD, LP, CS, digital download	—	—	—	
Blood Ritual	Released: 1 December 1992; Label: Century Media Records; Formats: CD, LP, CS, digital download	—	—	—	
Ceremony of Opposites	Released: 18 February 1994; Label: Century Media Records; Formats: CD, LP, CS, digital download	—	—	—	US: 13,581+
Passage	Released: 19 September 1996; Label: Century Media Records; Formats: CD, LP, CS, digital download	—	—	84	US: 11,788+
Eternal	Released: 19 July 1999; Label: Century Media Records; Formats: CD, LP, CS, digital download	—	—	59	
Reign of Light	Released: 11 October 2004; Label: Galactical, Regain Records; Formats: CD, CD+DVD, CS, LP, digital download	66	153	—	US: 408+
Solar Soul	Released: 1 June 2007; Label: Galactical, Nuclear Blast; Formats: CD, LP, digital download	41	158	—	US: 200+
Above	Released: 6 March 2009; Label: Galactical, Nuclear Blast; Formats: CD, LP, digital download	37	145	99	
Lux Mundi	Released: 29 April 2011; Label: Galactical, Nuclear Blast; Formats: CD, LP, digital download	46	—	—	
Hegemony	Released: 13 October 2017; Label: Napalm Records; Formats: CD, LP, digital download	22	—	76	
"—" denotes a recording that did not chart or was not released in that territory.

== Compilation albums ==
Title	Album details
Recordings '88 – '89	Released: 1989; Label: Self-released; Formats: CS
1987–1992	Released: 28 November 1994; Label: Century Media Records; Formats: CD
Since the Creation...	Released: 8 December 2003; Label: Century Media Records; Formats: LP (BOX)
Aeonics – An Anthology	Released: 26 February 2007; Label: Century Media Records; Formats: CD
Medieval Prophecy	Released: 28 October 2008; Label: Necrosound Records; Formats: CD
A Decade in Hell	Released: 22 November 2010; Label: Century Media Records; Formats: CD (BOX)

== EPs ==
Title	Album details
Rebellion	Released: 23 May 1995; Label: Century Media Records; Formats: CD
Exodus	Released: 2 June 1998; Label: Century Media Records; Formats: CD
Telepath	Released: 27 September 2004; Label: Galactical; Formats: CD
On Earth	Released: 13 June 2005; Label: Galactical; Formats: CD
Antigod	Released: 19 November 2010; Label: Nuclear Blast; Formats: CD, digital download

== Live albums ==
Title	Album details
Black Trip	Released: 17 June 2003; Label: Century Media Records; Formats: DVD
Passage – Live	Released: 16 February 2024; Label: Napalm Records; Formats: CD, LP, digital download

== Other affiliated releases ==
Title	Album details
Xytras Passage	Released: -; Label: Parallel Union Records; Formats: CD
Era One	Released: 27 January 2006; Label: Century Media Records; Formats: CD, digital download
Medieval Prophecy	Released: December 1988; Label: Necrosound; Formats: EP
Sedunum	Released: 11 July 2014; Label: Galactical/Kronos; Formats: CD

== Music videos ==
Year	Title	Directed	Album
1994	"Baphomet's Throne"	Tamara Jordan	Ceremony of Opposites
1996	"Jupiterian Vibe"	Andreas Marshall	Passage
1996	"Rain"	Ronald Matthes	Passage
1999	"Infra Galaxia"	Rodrigue Pellaud and Samael	Eternal
2004	"Telepath"	Alex Hansson, Roger Johansson	Reign of Light
2007	"Slavocracy"		Solar Soul
2009	"Black Hole"	Sergeï Ulyanov	Above
2011	"Luxferre"	Patric Ullaeus	Lux Mundi
2017	"Black Supremacy"	Marki Ghosteaser and MK	Hegemony
2021	"Helter Skelter"		Hegemony
2022	"Dictate of Transparency"		Hegemony
2025	"Black Matter Manifesto"		
2026	"Hidden Empire"	Very Metal Art	
2026	"Hail to the Sun"	Dariusz Szermanowicz	
