= Worship Him =

Studio album by Samael
- Released: April 1, 1991
- Recorded: Taurus Studio, Switzerland, March 1990
- Genre: Black metal
- Length: 41:15
- Label: Osmose Productions
- Producers: Claude Lander, Samael

Samael chronology
Medieval Prophecy (1988)	Worship Him (1991)	Blood Ritual (1992)

Blood Ritual & Worship Him reissue
- Century Media's 2001 double album reissue of Blood Ritual and Worship Him

Professional ratings
Review scores
Source	Rating
AllMusic	2.5/5 stars
Rock Hard	8/10

Worship Him is the debut full-length album from the Swiss black metal band Samael. Released in 1991, it was the first release from Osmose Productions, an independent French metal label. Worship Him is considered a milestone in the development of second wave black metal.

== Background and recording ==
Released on April 1, 1991, Worship Him was the first full-length album released by the newly formed Osmose Productions. Vorphalack, Samael's guitarist and singer, described the experience of recording the album with Claude Lander:

He never heard someone screaming their lungs out in the studio, so for him it was kind weird and he probably didn't consider it to be music, but at least he tried to do his best with the knowledge he had. The charisma of that first record is of working with a guy that doesn't know what he's doing, while you have a precise idea of what you want to do, so there's a confrontation.

== Musical style and influences ==
Samael's initial influences were Slayer, Bathory, Venom and early Possessed, plus NWOBHM acts Motörhead and Iron Maiden. Hellhammer were also hugely inspirational. Vorphalack claims that when he heard Apocalyptic Raids he thought:

'Wow, this is something that I can do, that I can dig and that I can do my own way,' because most of the metal bands at the time were very technical, they had a wide range of possibility, whereas we were more limited. So instead of trying to show off how good you were at whatever instrument you were playing or impress people with your skills, we were trying to create a mood, an atmosphere. That's how it started really. I used to say it back in the day, it was more about feelings than melody or technique, I was just trying to create something that [would cause people to] find themselves in a different dimension or world somehow.

== Legacy ==
Terrorizer magazine's first "Black Metal Special" issue recognized Samael as one of the early second wave of black metal bands that were "highly respected, influential and, most importantly, had their own unique sound." Worship Him had a significant impact on the early Norwegian black metal scene. Euronymous of Mayhem was a big supporter of the band. Although he never offered Samael a deal with Deathlike Silence Productions label, Euronymous regretted not releasing Worship Him, which he deemed an outstanding record. Another key figure in the early Norwegian black metal scene, Fenriz of Darkthrone fame, deemed Worship Him as a classic black metal album. The musician included the song "Into the Pentagram" as part of his own The Best of Old-School Black Metal compilation. Fenriz stated in the CD booklet the said song is "Samael's answer to Hellhammer's 'Triumph of Death'". Of Samael's early sound, he said the following:

Samael were on one of the bands that were feeding the black metal flame in a period when almost no one else did. Samael had a more occult feeling to it and definitely weren't in any black thrash tradition and didn't really have a lot of death metal either. I think it's strange, people took the Mayhem/Darkthrone/Burzum road, I wonder why didn't more more bands take the Samael road, because that was definitely interesting.

Decibel magazine inducted Worship Him to their "Hall of Fame" on their #118 issue, and also ranked it at number 41 on its list of the Top 100 Black Metal Albums of All Time.

== Track listing ==
- All songs written by Vorphalack, except where noted.

No.	Title	Length
1.	"Sleep of Death"	3:45
2.	"Worship Him" (Xytraguptor, Vorphalack)	6:30
3.	"Knowledge of the Ancient Kingdom"	5:06
4.	"Morbid Metal"	4:56
5.	"Rite of Cthulhu"	2:02
6.	"The Black Face"	3:31
7.	"Into the Pentagram"	6:47
8.	"Messenger of the Light"	2:42
9.	"Last Benediction" (Xytraguptor)	1:23
10.	"The Dark"	4:29

== Personnel ==
- Vorphalack : vocals, guitars, bass
- Xytraguptor : keyboards, drums, percussion

== Production ==
- Arranged and produced by Samael
- Recorded at Taurus Studio, Switzerland, March 1990
- Recorded and mixed by Claude Lander

== Bibliography ==
- Fenriz. (2004). Fenriz presents... The best of old-school black metal. United Kingdom: Peaceville Records.
- Patterson, Dayal. (2013). Black metal: evolution of the cult. Port Townsend: Feral House.
- Strachan, Guy (2005). The boys from the black stuff: a brief history of black metal, part two: in the name of the lore. Terrorizer, 128: 37.
