= Black Trip =

Live album (DVD) by Samael
- Released: June 2003
- Genre: Black metal, industrial metal
- Length: 170:00
- Label: Century Media

Samael chronology
Eternal (1999)	Black Trip (2003)	Reign of Light (2004)

Professional ratings
Review scores
Source	Rating
Chronicles of Chaos	8/10

The Black Trip album from Swiss heavy metal band Samael was released in 2003. It is a double DVD set which contains a concert held on Summer Breeze Festival (2002), a live concert held in Kraków, Poland, in 1996 during their "Passage" world tour. There are also video clips for the songs "Jupiterian Vibe", "Infra Galaxia" and "Baphomet's Throne" as well as interviews and footage shot during the recording sessions of the Passage album.

== Track listing ==
=== DVD 1 ===
Live at the Summer Breeze Festival in 2002:

1. Era One
2. Year Zero
3. Shining Kingdom
4. Rain
5. Together
6. The Cross
7. Home
8. Jupiterian Vibe
9. Radiant Star
10. Infra Galaxia
11. The Ones Who Came Before
12. Outro – Ceremony of Opposites
13. Black Trip
14. My Saviour
15. Video clip: Jupiterian Vibe
16. Video clip: Infra Galaxia
17. Video clip: Baphomet's Throne
18. Interviews Passage / Exodus Studio Sessions

=== DVD 2 ===
Live Passage Tour 1996 in Kraków, Poland:

1. Rebellion
2. Son of Earth
3. Shining Kingdom
4. Angels Decay
5. Mask of the Red Death
6. Into the Pentagram
7. Flagellation
8. Jupiterian Vibe
9. The Ones Who Came Before
10. Crown
11. Rain
12. My Saviour

Live USA 1994:

1. Black Trip
2. To Our Martyrs
3. Son of Earth
4. Crown
5. Baphomet's Throne
6. Flagellation
7. After the Sepulture
8. Intro / ... Into the Chaos
9. Celebration of the Fourth
10. Ceremony of Opposites
