= Demon Entrails =

Compilation album by Hellhammer
- Released: 18 February 2008
- Recorded: 10 June – 7 December 1983
- Studio: Grave Hill Bunker (Birchwil, Switzerland); Sound Concept Studio (Ramsen, Switzerland)
- Genre: Black metal; thrash metal
- Length: 1:51:57
- Label: Century Media/Prowlin' Death
- Producer: Hellhammer

Hellhammer chronology
Apocalyptic Raids 1990 A.D. (1990)	Demon Entrails (2008)

Professional ratings
Review scores
Source	Rating
About.com	4/5 stars
Allmusic	4/5 stars
Blabbermouth.net	(9/10)

Demon Entrails is a compilation album that comprises three demos by the Swiss extreme metal band Hellhammer. The demos – Death Fiend, Triumph of Death and Satanic Rites – were all recorded during 1983 and were properly remastered for this compilation.

== Music and lyrics ==
The music on Demon Entrails is considered to be primitive, drawing influence from Venom. According to Phil Freeman of AllMusic: "Hellhammer's riffs could be played by a chimp wearing boxing gloves, but they've got the same crunching power as songs by Motörhead, Discharge, and the Melvins, other groups with a keen understanding of unsubtlety." Tape hiss is audible on the album. The album's equalization and mix is considered to be "bass-heavy". Freeman said: "This music is a runaway bulldozer, the sound of three pissed-off young men cranking the amps and releasing all their frustration and misanthropy as fast as possible." The album's lyrics explore themes such as gore, damnation, and demonology.

== Artwork ==
There exists a deluxe release of the album that includes "full lyrics and a booklet full of rare photos," according to Phil Freeman of AllMusic.

== Reception and legacy ==
Phil Freeman of AllMusic gave the album a score of four stars out of five. He wrote: "It's no wonder Hellhammer's demos have been cited as an influence on pretty much the entire Scandinavian black metal scene, not to mention the young ladies of Japan's Gallhammer. Over 25 years later, this is still extremely powerful stuff, and the lavish packaging gives it the respect it deserves."

== Track listing ==
Disc 1: Satanic Rites
No.	Title	Length
1.	"Intro"	0:58
2.	"Messiah"	4:18
3.	"The Third of the Storms (Evoked Damnation)"	3:02
4.	"Buried and Forgotten"	6:01
5.	"Maniac" (re-recorded version)	3:46
6.	"Eurynomos"	3:10
7.	"Triumph of Death" (re-recorded version)	6:58
8.	"Revelations of Doom"	3:03
9.	"Reaper" (re-recorded version)	2:28
10.	"Satanic Rites"	7:18
11.	"Crucifixion" (re-recorded version)	2:45
12.	"Outro"	2:01
Total length:		45:48

- Recorded 2–4 December and 7, 1983 at Sound Concept Studio

Disc 2: Death Fiend and Triumph of Death
No.	Title	Length
1.	"Crucifixion"	3:04
2.	"Maniac"	4:01
3.	"(Execution) When Hell's Near"	2:38
4.	"Decapitator"	2:07
5.	"Blood Insanity"	4:22
6.	"Power of Satan"	4:11
7.	"Reaper"	2:06
8.	"Death Fiend"	2:35
9.	"Triumph of Death"	5:15
10.	"Metallic Storm"	2:19
11.	"Ready for Slaughter"	3:36
12.	"Dark Warriors"	3:03
13.	"Hammerhead"	2:48
14.	"Angel of Destruction"	2:58
15.	"Bloody Pussies"	4:59
16.	"Chainsaw"	3:58
17.	"Sweet Torment"	2:09
Total length:		55:09

- Recorded 10–11 June 1983 at Grave Hill Bunker

== Personnel ==
Hellhammer

- Tom Gabriel Warrior (Satanic Slaughter) – guitar, bass, vocals, production
- Martin Eric Ain (Slayed Necros) – backing vocals, production (disc one)
- Bruce Day (Denial Fiend/Bloodhunter) – drums
- Steve Warrior (Savage Damage) – bass, vocals

Production and Artwork

- Med Demiral – engineering (disc one)
- Rol Fuchs – production (disc two)
- Philipp Schweidler – remastering
- Andreas Schwarber – photography
- Martin Kyburz – photography
- Carsten Drescher – layout, design
- Janina Kasperidus – layout, design
- Nadine Mainka – layout, design
- Patrick Schombert – layout, design
- Stefan Wibbeke – layout, design

== Release history ==
Region	Date
Europe	18 February 2008
United States	26 February 2008
