= Satanic Rites =

Demo album by Hellhammer
- Released: December 1983
- Recorded: 1983
- Studio: Sound Concept Studio, Switzerland
- Genre: Black metal; thrash metal
- Length: 46:11
- Producer: Hellhammer

Hellhammer chronology
| Triumph of Death (1983) | Satanic Rites (1983) | Apocalyptic Raids (1984) |

Satanic Rites is the third and final demo tape by Swiss extreme metal band Hellhammer. It was recorded and distributed during December 1983. Along with Hellhammer's other releases, the demo had a major influence on the emerging death metal and black metal genres.

Satanic Rites later appeared on the compilation album Demon Entrails along with the two other demos, Death Fiend and Triumph of Death.

== Background ==
Martin Eric Ain was fifteen at the time of recording Satanic Rites. The line-up of Hellhammer was constantly changing around this time.

In the book Mean Deviation: Four Decades of Progressive Heavy Metal, the demo was described as "improved but still primitive".

Three members of Norwegian black metal band Mayhem took their names from song titles from this release: founder and guitarist Euronymous, and the first two vocalists Messiah and Maniac.

== Track listing ==
- Side 1:
1. "Intro" – 1:00
2. "Messiah" – 4:22
3. "The Third of the Storms (Evoked Damnation)" – 3:04
4. "Buried and Forgotten" – 6:03
5. "Maniac" – 3:48
6. "Eurynomos" – 3:11
- Side 2:
1. "Triumph of Death" – 7:00
2. "Revelations of Doom" – 3:05
3. "Reaper" – 2:30
4. "Satanic Rites" – 7:19
5. "Crucifixion" – 2:47
6. "Outro" – 2:02

== Credits ==
- Tom Gabriel Fischer – vocals, guitar, bass guitar (uncredited)
- Martin Eric Ain – bass guitar, backing vocals
- Bruce Day (Jörg Neubart) – drums
- Metin Demiral – vocal introduction on "Buried and Forgotten"
