= Antigod =

EP by Samael
- Released: November 19, 2010
- Studio: The Cube; Albertine; Switzerland
- Genre: Industrial metal
- Label: Nuclear Blast
- Producer: Samael

Samael chronology
Above (2009)	Antigod (2010)	Lux Mundi (2011)

Antigod is an EP by Swiss heavy metal band Samael.

== Track listing ==
All tracks are written by Vorph and Xy.

No.	Title	Length
1.	"Antigod"
2.	"Into the Pentagram (2010)"
3.	"Reign of Light (Live)"
4.	"Slavocracy (Live)"
5.	"Antigod (Dark Night Remix)"
6.	"Ten Thousand Years"

== Personnel ==
Samael

- Vorph – guitar, vocals, production
- Mak – guitar, production
- Mas – bass, production
- Xy – keyboards, programming, percussion, production

Technical personnel

- Russ Russell – mixing, mastering
- Patrix Pidoux – cover artwork
