= Above (Samael album) =

Studio album by Samael
- Released: 6 March 2009
- Studios: Little Rock, Switzerland
- Genres: Black metal, industrial metal
- Length: 38:30
- Label: Nuclear Blast
- Producer: Xy

Samael chronology
Solar Soul (2007)	Above (2009)	Antigod (2010)

Professional ratings
Review scores
Source	Rating
AllMusic	3.5/5 stars
Blabbermouth.net	6.5/10
Brave Words	Favorable
Chronicles of Chaos	5.5/10
Exclaim!	Favorable
Last Rites	Favorable
Metal Invader	Favorable
Rock Hard	9/10
Sputnikmusic	3.5/5 stars

Above is the eighth studio album from the Swiss heavy metal band Samael, released on 6 March 2009 by Nuclear Blast. The band released a video for "Black Hole" in September 2009, directed by Sergeï Ulyanov.

== Background ==
In May 2008, Samael introduced the band "Above" to the public, consisting of members of Samael under different monikers and calling them the "first virtual metal band ever". According to the band, they were founded on 6 June 2006 as "the fruit of a collaboration between creative minds who wanted to focus on a common project" and described their music as "merciless over-the-top metal with an intensity rarely achieved." Their first song made available to the public on the Band's Myspace page was "Black Hole". In the same month, Above published the song "Polygames" on their Myspace page. In late November 2008, after the work on Above's album was completed, Samael announced that "Above" would be the title of their next record and not the name of the project anymore.

Vocalist Vorph commented on the central idea behind the album: "We feel now it is the right time to remember the people where we come from, and that's exactly what 'Above' will do. It is like an enhanced version of our three or four first albums, maybe the missing link between 'Ceremony of Opposites' and 'Passage'. [...] With 'Above' we stripped everything down. It is a metal album through and through. [..] 'Above' is a little bit of a tribute to our early years as a band and to our first influences. [...] 'Above' is a good résumé of what pushed us to start playing music in the first place."

== Track listing ==
All lyrics are written by Vorph; all music is composed by Xy, except where noted.

No.	Title	Length
1.	"Under One Flag"	3:41
2.	"Virtual War"	4:04
3.	"Polygames"	3:56
4.	"Earth Country"	3:55
5.	"Illumination"	3:31
6.	"Black Hole"	3:36
7.	"In There"	4:01
8.	"Dark Side" (Music by Vorph)	2:57
9.	"God's Snake"	4:07
10.	"On the Top of it All"	4:42

CD Digipak and LP bonus track
No.	Title	Length
11.	"Black Hole (Verso Mix)"	3:34
Total length:		42:04

== Notes ==
The track "Dark Side" is a reworked version of "The Black Face" from the album Worship Him.

== Personnel ==
=== Samael ===
- Vorphalack – guitar, vocals
- Makro – guitar
- Masmiseîm – bass
- Xytraguptor – drums, keyboard, programming, production

=== Technical personnel ===
- Kris Fredriksson – recording, engineering
- Fredrik Nordström – mixing
- Erik Broheden – mastering
- Patrick Pidoux – artwork, layout, design

== Chart positions ==
Chart (2009)	Peak position
French Albums (SNEP)	145
German Albums (Offizielle Top 100)	99
Swiss Albums (Schweizer Hitparade)	37
