= Hegemon (disambiguation) =

A hegemon is a member of a ruling group.

Hegemon may also refer to:

- Hegemon of Thasos, 5th century BC Greek writer
- Hegemon of Earth, ruler of that planet, in the Ender's Game series

== See also ==
- Hegemony (disambiguation)
- Hegumen, the title for the head of a monastery in the Eastern Orthodox and Eastern Catholic Churches
