= Above =

Above may refer to:

- Above (artist), Tavar Zawacki (born 1981), contemporary urban artist
- Above (magazine), an American environmental magazine 2009–2010
- Above (Mad Season album), 1995
- Above (Pillar album), 2000
- Above (Samael album), 2009
- "Above", a song by Finger Eleven from Tip
