= What Will Be Has Been =

Studio album by Epoch of Unlight
- Released: 13 October 1998
- Recorded: July 12–18, 1998
- Genres: Melodic death metal, black metal
- Length: 47:45
- Label: The End

Epoch of Unlight chronology
What Will Be Has Been (1998)	Caught in the Unlight! (2001)

What Will Be Has Been is the first full-length studio album released by the American melodic death/black metal band Epoch of Unlight. It was the eighth release by The End Records.

== Track listing ==
1. "Ad Infinitum" (4:49)
2. "Undone Within" (3:56)
3. "Silver Mistress" (5:23)
4. "Burning as One" (5:49)
5. "...What Will Be Has Been" (5:47)
6. "Crimson Might (and Glory)" (5:08)
7. "(From Northern Aeries to) The Infinite Cycle of the Unborn Lord" (3:17)
8. "The Day the Light Hath Died" (4:41)
9. "Conflagration of Hate" (5:01)
10. "Immortal Crucify" (3:54)

== Personnel ==
=== Recording line-up ===
- Tino LoSicco – drums
- Randy Robertson – guitars
- Jason Smith – vocals, guitars
- Pierce Totty – bass

=== Production ===
- Recorded at the Sound Factory
- Mastered at Audiographic Masterworks
- Mark Yoshida – engineer
- Mastering engineer – Bill Pappas
- Cover art – Jose Luis de Juan
- Layout design – Dennis Gerasimenko and Sergey Makhotkin
