= Epoch of Unlight =

American melodic death metal band

- Origin: Memphis, Tennessee, US
- Genre: Melodic black/death
- Years active: 1994–present
- Label: The End
- Members: Tino LoSicco; John Fortier; Joseph Totty; Josh Braddock; Scott Baggett

Epoch of Unlight is a melodic death metal band from Memphis, Tennessee. The band formed in 1990, playing under different names, including Enraptured and Requiem, until 1994, when they officially settled on Epoch of Unlight.

== Biography ==
In 1994, they released their first demo as Epoch, the four-song cassette Beyond the Pale. In 1995, they recorded the a 4-song MCD Within The Night…. In May 1997, they recorded the three-track promo CD Black & Crimson Glory. The band captured the attention of several labels. In the winter of 1998, Epoch of Unlight signed with The End Records. Shortly thereafter, the band recorded What Will Be Has Been. The album was a mix of melodic death/black metal. The band supported the release with numerous live shows, including a five-week national tour with Norwegian symphonic black metal band Dimmu Borgir and Samael. The tour consisted of over 30 shows throughout the USA.

The band's second album, Caught in the Unlight!, was recorded in December 2000 with Keith Falgout (Soilent Green, Crisis, Crowbar and Cephalic Carnage, among others). This album placed less emphasis on black metal, opting for a melodic, technical death metal sound.

The band supported Caught in the Unlight! with numerous live shows through the country, including a two-week national tour with Enslaved and an appearance at the first annual Northern Lights Festival in Toronto, Ontario, Canada.

In 2003, Epoch of Unlight recorded a cover of Kreator's "Betrayer" and At the Gates' "Raped by the Light of Christ" for a split 7-inch single with Goatwhore through Bloated Goat Records.

The band entered Big Blue Meenie studio in New Jersey October 27, 2004, to record their third release for The End Records, The Continuum Hypothesis. Erin Farley (All Out War, Agnostic Front, Sick of It All, Madball, M.O.D., Overkill, among others) engineered and co-produced the album. Singer B.J. Cook (a.k.a. Lord Hellspawn) from Arkansas' Fallen Empire debuted on this album.

In October 2021, Epoch of Unlight entered AB Studios (Memphis, TN) with producer Alan Burcham to record their fourth full-length album, and first since 2005, At War With the Multiverse. Tony Lindgren (Fascination Street Studios) mastered it in July 2022, and it was released in September, 2022.

== Discography ==
- Beyond the Pale - Demo, 1994
- Within the Night ... - EP, 1995
- Promo '96 - Demo, 1996
- Black & Crimson Glory - Demo, 1997
- What Will Be Has Been - Full-length, 1998
- Caught in the Unlight! - Full-length, 2001
- Goatwhore / Epoch of Unlight - Split 7-inch, 2003
- The Continuum Hypothesis - Full-length, 2005
- At War With the Multiverse - Full-length, 2022
