= Hegemony (disambiguation) =

In geopolitics, hegemony is the predominance of one state over other states. In sociology and cultural studies, cultural hegemony refers to how a ruling class secures the consent of the ruled. It may also refer to:

- Hegemony (album), a 2017 album by Swiss band Samael
- Hegemony (video game series)
- "Hegemony" (Star Trek: Strange New Worlds), an episode of the second season of Star Trek: Strange New Worlds
- Hegemony, an interstellar human government in the Hyperion Cantos science fiction universe
