= Solar Soul =

Studio album by Samael
- Released: 1 June 2007
- Recorded: 2006
- Studio: The Cube; Albertine; Roystone; Switzerland
- Genre: Industrial metal, symphonic metal
- Length: 46:45
- Label: Nuclear Blast
- Producer: Waldemar Sorychta, Xy

Samael chronology
Era One (2006)	Solar Soul (2007)	Above (2009)

Professional ratings
Review scores
Source	Rating
AllMusic	2.5/5 stars
Chronicles of Chaos	6.5/10
Exclaim!	Mixed
Rock Hard	8/10

Solar Soul is the seventh album by the Swiss heavy metal band Samael, released on 1 June 2007 through Nuclear Blast.

== Background ==
In February 2007, the band made public that they had signed with Nuclear Blast for the upcoming record.

== Track listing ==
All lyrics are written by Vorph; all music is composed by Xy.

No.	Title	Length
1.	"Solar Soul"	3:44
2.	"Promised Land"	3:58
3.	"Slavocracy"	3:31
4.	"Western Ground"	4:06
5.	"On the Rise"	3:51
6.	"Alliance"	3:41
7.	"Suspended Time"	3:44
8.	"Valkyries' New Ride"	3:54
9.	"AVE!"	4:15
10.	"Quasar Waves"	3:37
11.	"Architect"	3:51
12.	"Olympus"	4:39

== Personnel ==
=== Samael ===
- Vorph – guitar, vocals
- Xy – keyboard, drums, programming, production
- Mas – bass
- Makro – guitar

=== Additional musicians ===
- Sami Yli-Sirniö – sitar (10)
- Vibeke Stene – vocals (7)

=== Technical personnel ===
- Waldemar Sorychta – production
- D-Teck – engineering
- Stéphane Loup – engineering
- Stefan Glaumann – mixing
- Tor Ingvarsson – Pro Tools assistant
- Henrik Jonsson – mastering
- Patrick Pidoux – front cover, additional graphics
- Edi Maurer – portraits
- Petri de Pità – band picture
- Carsten Drescher – layouts

== Charts ==
Chart (2007)	Peak position
French Albums (SNEP)	158
Swiss Albums (Schweizer Hitparade)	41
