= The Continuum Hypothesis (album) =

The Contimuum Hypothesis

Studio album by Epoch of Unlight
- Released: 2005
- Recorded: October 27 – November 4, 2004
- Genres: Melodic death metal, black metal
- Length: 53:11
- Label: The End Records

Epoch of Unlight chronology
Caught in the Unlight! (2001)	The Contimuum Hypothesis (2005)

Professional ratings
Review scores
Source	Rating
Chronicles of Chaos	9/10
MetalReviews.com	82/100

The Continuum Hypothesis is the third full-length studio album released by the melodic death/black metal band Epoch of Unlight. It is the first to feature vocalist BJ Cook and guitarist Josh Braddock.

== Track listing ==
1. "The Continuum Hypothesis" (4:44)
2. "Under Starside Skies" (4:08)
3. "Argentum Era Secui Duos" (5:37)
4. "Cardinality" (3:32)
5. "Highgate" (6:18)
6. "The End of All" (6:07)
7. "Broken Pendulum" (3:51)
8. "Aberrant Shadows" (5:26)
9. "Quicksilver to Ash" (5:02)
10. "Denubrum" (4:17)
11. "The Scarlet Thread" (4:09)

== Personnel ==
=== Musicians ===
- Tino LoSicco – drums
- Joe Totty – bass
- BJ Cook – vocals
- Josh Braddock – guitars

=== Guest musicians ===
- Erin Farley – backing vocals on "Aberrant Shadows"

=== Production ===
- Recorded at Blue Meanie Studios, New Jersey
- Mixed and mastered at Blue Meanie Studios, New Jersey
- Produced by Erin Farley and Epoch of Unlight
- Engineered and mixed by Erin Farley
- Assistant engineer – Jeff Cummings
- Mix assistant – Coady Brown
- Mastered by Tim Gilles
- Artwork and band photography by Fumunda Design
