= Exodus (Samael album) =

EP by Samael
- Released: 20 April 1998
- Genre: Symphonic black metal, industrial metal
- Length: 28:51
- Label: Century Media
- Producer: Waldemar Sorychta

Samael chronology
Passage (1996)	Exodus (1998)	Eternal (1999)

Professional ratings
Review scores
Source	Rating
AllMusic	1.5/5 stars
Chronicles of Chaos	8/10
Rock Hard	8.5/10

Exodus is an EP by Swiss heavy metal band Samael, released on 20 April 1998 through Century Media. The contents of the release were later included as bonus tracks on the 2007 re-release of Passage.

== Track listing ==
No.	Title	Length
1.	"Exodus"	3:48
2.	"Tribes of Caïn"	3:33
3.	"Son of Earth"	4:37
4.	"Winter Solstice"	3:33
5.	"Ceremony of Opposites"	5:03
6.	"From Malkuth to Kether"	4:31
7.	"Static Journey" (Unlisted instrumental track, exactly the same as second part of hidden track on Rebellion EP.)	3:46

== Personnel ==
- Vorph – guitar, vocals
- Masmiseim – bass
- Xy – keyboards, programming
- Kaos – guitar
