= Era One =

Studio album by Samael
- Released: January 30, 2006 (Europe)
- Recorded: 2002–2005
- Genre: Industrial metal, electronic rock (Era One); Industrial, ambient (Lessons in Magic #1)
- Length: 39:30 (Era One); 38:04 (Lessons in Magic #1)
- Label: Century Media

Samael chronology
Reign of Light (2004)	Era One (2006)	Solar Soul (2007)

Era One is a 2006 album by Swiss industrial metal band Samael. It saw the band return to the Century Media label, with composition and instrumentals by Xy, and lyrics and vocals by Vorph. It includes a bonus disc, "Lessons in Magic #1", which is entirely instrumental and done solely by band member Xy. The album itself was recorded in 2002, and the bonus disc a year later. Both were rearranged and remixed in 2005.

== Track listing ==
=== Era One ===
1. "Era One" (intro) - 2:33
2. "Universal Soul" - 4:19
3. "Sound of Galaxies" - 4:21
4. "Beyond" (instrumental) - 2:59
5. "Night Ride" - 4:40
6. "Diamond Drops" - 4:26
7. "Home" (instrumental) - 1:36
8. "Voyage" - 4:00
9. "Above as Below" - 5:03
10. "Koh-i-Noor" - 5:03

=== Lessons in Magic #1 ===
1. "Connexion" - 4:28
2. "Reading Mind" - 3:21
3. "Red Unction" - 3:33
4. "Flying High" - 4:04
5. "Overcome" - 3:57
6. "Inside Stairs" - 4:01
7. "One with Everything" - 5:16
8. "Silent Words" - 4:45
9. "Wealth and Fortune" - 4:39
