= Caught in the Unlight! =

Studio album by Epoch of Unlight
- Released: 2001
- Recorded: December 16–20, 2000
- Genre: Melodic death/Black metal
- Length: 42:53
- Label: The End

Epoch of Unlight chronology
What Will Be Has Been (1998)	Caught in the Unlight! (2001)	The Continuum Hypothesis (2005)

Professional ratings
Review scores
Source	Rating
AllMusic	4/5 stars
Chronicles of Chaos	10/10

Caught in the Unlight! is the second full-length studio album released by the melodic death/black metal band Epoch of Unlight.

== Track listing ==
1. "Untitled Intro" (0:25)
2. "At the Threshold of Might" (3:24)
3. "The Ethereal Taint" (3:27)
4. "Crimson and Steel" (4:48)
5. "In the Absence of Light" (4:09)
6. "The Last to Fall" (4:16)
7. "Ululant Cries" (4:42)
8. "Return to Eidolon" (4:40)
9. "Hounds of Tindalos" (4:57)
10. "Aegri Somnia Vana" (3:54)
11. "Caught in the Unlight" (4:11)

== Personnel ==
=== Musicians ===
- Tino LoSicco – drums
- Jason Smith – guitar and vocals
- Joseph Totty – bass

=== Production ===
- Recorded at Festival Studios, Louisiana
- Mastered at Ronn Chick Recordings
- Keith Falgout – engineer and mixer
- Cover art – Jose Luis de Juan
- Band photos – Heidi Lane
- Layout design – The End Records
