= Lux Mundi (album) =

Studio album by Samael
- Released: 29 April 2011
- Studio: The Cube; Roystone; Albertine; Switzerland
- Genre: Symphonic black metal, industrial metal
- Length: 49:02
- Label: Nuclear Blast, Season of Mist
- Producer: Xy, Waldemar Sorychta

Samael chronology
Antigod (2010)	Lux Mundi (2011)	Hegemony (2017)

Singles from Lux Mundi
- 1. "Antigod" Released: 19 November 2010

Professional ratings
Review scores
Source	Rating
AllMusic	4/5 stars
Angry Metal Guy	4/5 stars
Exclaim!	Favorable
Revolver	3/5 stars
Rock Hard	8.5/10
Sputnikmusic	3.5/5 stars

Lux Mundi is the ninth studio album from the heavy metal band Samael, released on 29 April 2011 through Nuclear Blast. The Latin words Lux Mundi translate as "Light of the World".

== Promotion ==
Previous to the release of the album, Samael released a series of webisodes that featured footage from the studio sessions. The three episodes were filmed by Sergey Ulyanov and featured excerpts from album tracks.

The band released a video for the song "Luxferre", directed in Gothenburg by Patric Ullaeus.

== Track listing ==
All lyrics are written by Vorph; all music is composed by Xy.

No.	Title	Length
1.	"Luxferre"	3:49
2.	"Let My People Be!"	3:49
3.	"Of War"	3:41
4.	"Antigod"	4:04
5.	"For a Thousand Years"	4:55
6.	"The Shadow of the Sword"	3:49
7.	"In the Deep"	4:02
8.	"Mother Night"	4:18
9.	"Pagan Trance"	4:19
10.	"In Gold We Trust"	3:29
11.	"Soul Invictus"	4:18
12.	"The Truth is Marching On"	4:29

== Personnel ==
=== Samael ===
- Vorph – guitar, vocals
- Mak – guitar
- Mas – bass
- Xy – drums, keyboard, programming, production

=== Technical personnel ===
- Waldemar Sorychta – production
- Russ Russell – mixing, mastering
- Patrick Pidoux – cover artwork, layout artwork

== Charts ==
Chart (2011)	Peak position
Swiss Albums (Schweizer Hitparade)	46
