= Death Fiend =

Demo album by Hellhammer
- Released: 1983
- Recorded: June 1983
- Genre: Thrash metal; black metal
- Length: 32:03
- Label: Prowlin' Death Records

Hellhammer chronology
Death Fiend (1983)	Triumph of Death (1983)

Death Fiend is an unreleased demo tape by Swiss extreme metal band Hellhammer. It was recorded in June 1983, along with the Triumph of Death demo, and later appeared on the compilation album Demon Entrails.

== Track listing ==
- Side 1:
1. "Maniac" – 4:15
2. "Angel of Destruction" – 3:03
3. "Hammerhead" – 2:57
4. "Bloody Pussies" – 5:35
- Side 2:
1. "Death Fiend" – 2:44
2. "Dark Warriors" – 3:15
3. "Chainsaw" – 4:12
4. "Ready for Slaughter" – 3:45
5. "Sweet Torment" – 2:17

== Credits ==
- Thomas Gabriel Fischer a.k.a. Satanic Slaughter – vocals, guitars
- Urs Sprenger a.k.a. Savage Damage – bass
- Jörg Neubart a.k.a. Bloodhunter – drums
