= Hegemony (album) =

Studio album by Samael
- Released: 13 October 2017
- Studio: The Cube, Roystone Studio, Switzerland
- Genre: Symphonic black metal; industrial metal
- Length: 55:40
- Label: Napalm
- Producer: Waldemar Sorychta, Xy

Samael chronology
Lux Mundi (2011)	Hegemony (2017)

Professional ratings
Review scores
Source	Rating
BraveWords	8/10
Heavy Music HQ	4/5 stars
Metal Hammer	8/10
Metal Injection	8/10

Hegemony is the tenth studio album from Swiss industrial metal band Samael, released on 13 October 2017 through Napalm.

== Background ==
In February 2017, Samael signed with Austrian record label Napalm for worldwide distribution. The release year of the album coincides with the band's 30th anniversary. Hegemony is the first Samael album to feature bassist Thomas "Drop" Betrisey whose recruitment the band had announced in early 2015.

== Writing ==
Hegemony was in the making for over four years and saw a shift from the occult and spiritual themes prevalent on past albums to social and political topics. "It is the first time we've been very much connected with the zeitgeist", said vocalist Vorph to Metal Hammer. While the band were working in a more isolated manner in the past, Vorph cited the strong influence of the media and technology as a reason for the different approach on Hegemony: "Somehow today, you cannot do this anymore. The news is already on your phone, it's everywhere. You cannot distance yourself, it's running after you."

With the track "Samael" Vorph wanted to explore the meaning of the band name: "I wanted to explain what Samael is as an entity. [...] There is an energy going through this band, and there are moments when we are more than four people." According to Vorph, when focusing on live situations, the song represents unity, connection and a "sense of belonging that exists outside of the mainstream".

The track "Rite of Renewal" is seen by Vorph as a testimony to Russian composer Igor Stravinsky. Vorph mentioned his own bias for dissonance and noise referring to dissonant elements used by Stravinsky and saw it as counterbalance to keyboard player and songwriter Xy's symphonic approach.

Regarding the whole album, Vorph said it was closely connected with predecessor album Lux Mundi: "This album, we built upon that one, and we said to ourselves, let's take it to the next level somehow."

== Release ==
In mid-September 2017, Samael premiered a video for the track "Black Supremacy". A week before issuing the album the band released a video for the title track "Hegemony", commenting "we choose to open the album with this song because we thought it sets the tone."

== Critical reception ==
Revisiting Samael's musical development during their career, Cheryl Carter in her review for Metal Hammer found that "experimentation has worked in their favour through time" and that the album "sounds vibrant, accessible and deliciously catchy while housing muscular riffs and thrilling synth-led progressions". She highlighted "Vorph's dynamic voice, still huge after all this time" and concluded, "Hegemony is a slick and vital record that sounds absolutely massive and is wickedly good fun."

== Track listing ==
All lyrics are written by Vorph, except where noted; all music is composed by Xy, except where noted.

No.	Title	Length
1.	"Hegemony"	3:47
2.	"Samael"	3:58
3.	"Angel of Wrath"	3:29
4.	"Rite of Renewal"	4:31
5.	"Red Planet"	3:58
6.	"Black Supremacy"	3:50
7.	"Murder or Suicide"	4:03
8.	"This World"	3:52
9.	"Against All Enemies"	4:31
10.	"Land of the Living"	4:12
11.	"Dictate of Transparency"	3:58
12.	"Helter Skelter" (Written by Lennon–McCartney)	3:26

Bonus track
No.	Title	Length
13.	"Storm of Fire"	4:11

== Personnel ==
=== Samael ===
- Vorph – guitar, vocals
- Mak – guitar
- Drop – bass
- Xy – keyboard, programming, production

=== Technical personnel ===
- Waldemar Sorychta – production
- Stefan Glaumann – mixing
- Svante Forsbäck – mastering
- Patrick Pidoux – album cover, layout
- Aline Fournier – band photography

== Charts ==
Chart (2017)	Peak position
Belgian Albums (Ultratop Wallonia)	179
German Albums (Offizielle Top 100)	76
Swiss Albums (Schweizer Hitparade)	22
