= Apocalyptic Raids =

EP by Hellhammer
- Released: March 1984; 1990 (1990 re-release)
- Recorded: 2–7 March 1984
- Studios: Caet Studio, Berlin
- Genres: Black metal; thrash metal
- Length: 19:41; 27:03 (1990 re-release)
- Label: Noise
- Producers: Tom Warrior, Martin Ain, Karl U. Walterbach

Hellhammer chronology
Satanic Rites (1983)	Apocalyptic Raids (1984)	Demon Entrails (2008)

Apocalyptic Raids is an EP by Swiss extreme metal band Hellhammer. It was recorded and released in March 1984, and was the band's only commercial release.

== Background and release ==
Hellhammer split up only three months after recording this EP, and later regrouped as Celtic Frost. The EP would be reissued six years later as Apocalyptic Raids 1990 A.D., boasting new artwork and two bonus tracks.

Professional ratings
Review scores
Source	Rating
Collector's Guide to Heavy Metal	1/10

== Artwork ==
The cover art of Apocalyptic Raids is influenced by German Expressionism's stark aesthetic, combining monochromaticity with the band's blood-red, blackletter-styled logo.

== Legacy and impact ==
The record was a major influence on the then-emerging death metal and black metal genres. It has served as an inspiration to such varied and respected bands as Napalm Death and Sepultura, both of whom recorded cover versions of "Messiah". In 2018, the staff of Revolver included the album in their list of the "25 Essential Black Metal Albums". They said: "Though the band existed for less than two years, the harsh cacophony of the Apocalyptic Raids demo perfectly expressed black metal’s caustic furor."

In 2013, Decibel ranked Apocalyptic Raids at number 19 on its list of the Top 100 Black Metal Albums of All Time.

== Track listings ==
Original 1984 release
No.	Title	Writer(s)	Length
1.	"The Third of the Storms (Evoked Damnation)"	Tom G. Warrior	2:55
2.	"Massacra"	Warrior	2:49
3.	"Triumph of Death"	Warrior	9:30
4.	"Horus/Aggressor"	Warrior, Martin Eric Ain	4:27

1990 re-release bonus tracks
No.	Title	Writer(s)	Length
5.	"Revelations of Doom"	Warrior, Ain	2:49
6.	"Messiah"	Warrior, Ain	4:33

Tracks 5 and 6 were originally part of the now out-of-print Death Metal (1984) compilation.

== Credits ==
=== Original 1984 release ===
- Hellhammer – producers
  - Satanic Slaughter (a.k.a. Tom Warrior) – V-Axe Holocaust (guitar), Dambuster Vocals (lead vocals)
  - Slayed Necros (a.k.a. Martin Ain) – Deadly Bassdose (bass), Backing Howling... (backing vocals)
  - Denial Fiend (a.k.a. Bruce Day) – Hellish Crossfire on Wooden Coffins (drums)
- Horst Mueller – engineer
- Thomas Fischer – cover design, frontcover drawing "The Sitting Death" (© 1984)
- Mr. Jeckyl – heptagram
- Burzelbar – pix

=== Apocalyptic Raids 1990 A.D. ===
- Tom G. Warrior – vocals, guitar, backing vocals
- Martin E. Ain – bass, cover design
- Bruce Day – drums
- Horst Müller – engineer, mixing
- Julia Schechner – layout
- José Posada – illustrations
- Karl U. Walterbach – executive producer

== Charts ==
Chart performance for Apocalyptic Raids
Chart (2020–2025)	Peak position
German Albums (Offizielle Top 100)	39
Greek Albums (IFPI)	71
Swiss Albums (Schweizer Hitparade)	28
