= Ceremony of Opposites =

Studio album by Samael
- Released: 18 February 1994
- Recorded: January 1994
- Genre: Black metal; industrial metal
- Length: 35:58
- Label: Century Media
- Producer: Waldemar Sorychta

Samael chronology
Blood Ritual (1992)	Ceremony of Opposites (1994)	Rebellion (1995)

Ceremony of Opposites is the third album by Swiss extreme metal band Samael.

This is their second release with Century Media Records after leaving French label Osmose Productions. Although the band's subject matter was similar to previous releases (references to Aleister Crowley, Satanism and blasphemy), it also showed their first signs of interest in industrial music, a direction that they would take on future albums.

It was produced by Waldemar Sorychta, who also worked on recordings by Lacuna Coil, Tiamat, Moonspell and others.

In 2005, the album was re-issued with their 1995 Rebellion EP.

== Critical reception ==
Professional ratings
Review scores
Source	Rating
AllMusic	4.5/5 stars
Best Black Metal Album	91%
Metal Reviews	95/100
Metal Storm	8.5/10 stars
Rock Hard	9/10
Sputnikmusic	4/5 stars

Upon release, Ceremony of Opposites was met with universal acclaim by both music critics and band's fans. In 2005, Ceremony of Opposites was ranked number 284 in Rock Hard magazine's book of The 500 Greatest Rock & Metal Albums of All Time.

== Track listing ==
All tracks by Vorph and Xy.

1. "Black Trip" – 3:19
2. "Celebration of the Fourth" – 2:53
3. "Son of Earth" – 3:58
4. "'Till We Meet Again" – 4:11
5. "Mask of the Red Death" – 3:04
6. "Baphomet's Throne" – 3:30
7. "Flagellation" – 3:41
8. "Crown" – 4:06
9. "To Our Martyrs" – 2:37
10. "Ceremony of Opposites" – 4:39

== Personnel ==
- Vorph – guitar, vocals, arranger
- Masmiseim – bass
- Xy – drums, arranger
- Rodolphe H. – keyboards, samplers
- Carsten Otterbach – artwork
- Mussorgsky/Ravel – sampling
- Waldemar Sorychta – producer, engineer, mixing
- Siggi Bemm – assistant engineer
