= Blood Ritual (album) =

Studio album by Samael
- Released: December 1, 1992
- Recorded: T&T Studios, Gelsenkirchen, Germany
- Genre: Black metal
- Length: 41:46
- Label: Century Media
- Producer: Waldemar Sorychta

Samael chronology
| Worship Him (1991) | Blood Ritual (1992) | Ceremony of Opposites (1994) |

Professional ratings
Review scores
| Source | Rating |
|---|---|
| About.com | Favorable |
| AllMusic | 3.5/5 stars |

Blood Ritual is the second album by the Swiss heavy metal band Samael, released in 1992 on the Century Media Records label.

In 2013, Decibel ranked Blood Ritual at number 64 on its list of the Top 100 Black Metal Albums of All Time.

== Background and recording ==
When Samael's one-album-only contract with Osmose Productions expired the group signed with Century Media which, in the words of vocalist/guitarist Vorphalack, offered them a "rather interesting" deal. The long time between Worship Him and Blood Ritual, explains Vorphalack, was due to negotiations between them and the label. The band chose to record their new record in Germany rather than Switzerland due to the expensive studio time of their native country.

== Music ==
Vorphalack argued that the main change between Worship Him and Blood Ritual was the record production and not the music. According to him there are songs in their sophomore album that pre-date their debut.

== Track listing ==
1. "Epilogue" – 0:40
2. "Beyond the Nothingness" – 4:31
3. "Poison Infiltration" – 3:58
4. "After the Sepulture" – 4:35
5. "Macabre Operetta" – 6:41
6. "Blood Ritual" – 3:25
7. "Since the Creation..." – 0:34
8. "With the Gleam of the Torches" – 6:25
9. "Total Consecration" – 2:40
10. "Bestial Devotion" – 4:50
11. "...Until the Chaos" – 3:25

== Personnel ==
- Vorphalack - Vocals, Guitars
- Masmiseim - Bass
- Xytraguptor - Keyboards, Drums, Percussion

== Bibliography ==
- Löns, S. (1993). Samael. Witchraft, 1: 7-9.
