= Hellhammer =

Swiss extreme metal band

Background information
- Origin: Nürensdorf, Switzerland
- Genres: Black metal; thrash metal
- Years active: 1982–1984
- Labels: Noise, Century Media
- Spinoffs: Celtic Frost
- Past members: Thomas Gabriel Fischer; Urs Sprenger; Pete Stratton; Jörg Neubart; Martin Eric Ain; Mike Owens; Stephen Priestly; Vince Caretti
- Website: hellhammer.org

Hellhammer was a Swiss extreme metal band from Nürensdorf, active from 1982 to 1984. The band's sound and style were heavily criticized and poorly reviewed during their active years, but have been praised in retrospect and regarded as a key influence on black metal. In June 1984, Hellhammer disbanded, and two members formed extreme metal band Celtic Frost.

== History ==
=== Musical career ===
Inspired by Black Sabbath, Venom, Raven, Motörhead and Angel Witch, guitarist/vocalist Thomas Gabriel Fischer (a.k.a. "Tom Warrior"), bassist/vocalist Urs Sprenger (a.k.a. "Savage Damage" and "Steve Warrior") from the band Grave Hill, and drummer Pete Stratton (Peter Ebneter) formed Hammerhead (later Hellhammer) in May 1982. Fischer "was not into punk," but he was "blown away" by the Discharge records Why and Hear Nothing See Nothing Say Nothing, which influenced his music. He noted that a lack of extreme metal meant that Venom and Motörhead fans had to listen to punk bands for similar sounds. GBH and Anti-Nowhere League were also influential.

After Stratton exited and drummer Jörg Neubart (a.k.a. "Denial Fiend", "Bloodhunter" and "Bruce Day", from the band Moorhead) joined in autumn 1982, Hellhammer struggled to find a rehearsal space due to high rents or unavailable studio hours. In June 1983, the group recorded the demo tape Triumph of Death for $70. Although embarrassed by the result, Hellhammer shipped their demo to heavy metal magazines, such as Great Britain's Metal Forces. Critical response was generally favorable. Rejected by the labels they sent tapes to, the band caught the attention of Noise Records.

Steve Warrior was dismissed in the summer of 1983 due to lack of talent, and replaced with Mike "Grim Decapitator" Owens (Mike Baum) from the band Violence. Schizo drummer Stephen Priestly from Wallisellen replaced Bruce Day in October 1983, and, later in 1983, fellow Schizo member Martin Eric Ain replaced Owens on bass, a change that transformed the band's music and lyrics. Also in 1983, Day rejoined to replace Priestly, completing the line-up that recorded Hellhammer's only commercial release, Apocalyptic Raids, in March 1984. After the EP, guitarist Vince "Dei Infernal" Caretti joined Hellhammer, after future Celtic Frost guitarist Oliver Amberg declined. These changes increased Fischer's and Ain's perception of being limited within Hellhammer's primitive confines. Hellhammer disbanded on May 11, 1984, and Fischer and Ain formed Celtic Frost in June.

=== Post-breakup ===
In 1990, Noise Records re-released Hellhammer's debut, retitled Apocalyptic Raids 1990 A.D. This re-issue included two tracks off the Death Metal compilation, "something we always wanted to, even back in '84", claimed Fischer. This re-release had a new cover design by Martin Ain.

In November 2007, Fischer announced that the original master tapes of Hellhammer's demos (Death Fiend, Triumph of Death, and Satanic Rites) would be released as the 2CD/3LP package Demon Entrails in February 2008, with new liner notes, unreleased photos and artwork, and all tracks remastered by Fischer, Martin Eric Ain, and Steve Warrior. Prowlin' Death/Century Media Records released the album.

In 2016, Century Media and Prowling Death Records joint-released Blood Insanity, an unreleased 7" vinyl single the band recorded in 1983. Fischer explained that the band contemplated releasing material they recorded at the time of the Triumph of Death demo sessions, which would contain two songs. The single remained unreleased until the band's split, voiding any future releases plans. Fischer presented the idea of releasing the single to Century Media, to which the record company agreed.

Around 2019, Fischer formed Triumph Of Death as a tribute to Hellhammer. Triumph Of Death has toured and played shows, and released the live album Resurrection Of The Flesh in 2023.

== Reception and legacy ==
Although former members felt proud of Hellhammer's legacy by the end of the 1980s, that was not always the case. Fischer feared that his involvement in Hellhammer might hinder Celtic Frost's future. A 1985 Kerrang! review articulated his fears: "The truly execrable Hellhammer may now have turned into Celtic Frost but still suck on the big one."

Other publications were also skeptical of Hellhammer. Metal Forces loathed the group, which started a feud between that zine and Fischer, preventing Celtic Frost from playing in England for a couple of years. Rock Power considered Hellhammer "the most terrible, abhorrent, and atrocious thing 'musicians' were ever allowed to record". They were "receiving miserable reviews everywhere", Warrior concluded.

Regarding his former band, Fischer said,

Way back in 1984 and 85, when Martin Eric Ain and I recorded Celtic Frost's first two albums Morbid Tales and To Mega Therion, Hellhammer lasted on us almost like a curse. Even though Hellhammer was the very reason we had thought over our goals and conceived the Frost, HH's left-overs kept being mighty rocks in our way. Many voices saw Frost as the same band with just a name-change. The lack of musical quality in HH made it almost impossible for us to get an unbiased reaction for Frost. To make a long story short, it almost killed all our work and dreams.

Phil Freeman of AllMusic stated, "Hellhammer was more of an after the fact legend than a band; the group released exactly six songs in any official way, and only garnered notice when frontman Thomas Gabriel Fischer (aka Thomas Gabriel Warrior) formed his next band, the avant-garde thrash act Celtic Frost."

The four-track 12" EP Apocalyptic Raids was released in March 1984. By that time, the band had broken up, but the EP was among the first black/death metal recordings and spawned many imitators, playing doom metal, thrash metal, black metal and death metal. Fischer and Ain formed Celtic Frost in summer of 1984.

Hellhammer covers by notable bands include Napalm Death, Sepultura, Samael, Incantation, Slaughter, Behemoth, and Gallhammer. Fischer's post-Celtic Frost band, Apollyon Sun, reworked "Messiah".

Fischer released the book Only Death Is Real: An Illustrated History of Hellhammer and early Celtic Frost 1982–1985 in 2010, which documents the early days of both bands. Darkthrone guitarist Nocturno Culto wrote the foreword and author Joel McIver wrote the introduction.

== Band members ==
=== Final ===
- Tom G. "Satanic Slaughter" Warrior (Thomas Gabriel Fischer) – guitar, lead vocals (1982–1984)
- "Slayed Necros" (Martin Eric Ain) – bass (1983–1984; died 2017)
- Bruce "Denial Fiend" Day (Jörg Neubart) – drums (1982–1984)
- Vince "Dei Infernal" Caretti (Vincent Garetti) – guitar (1984)

=== Previous members ===
- Pete Stratton (Peter Ebneter) – drums (1982)
- Steve "Savage Damage" Warrior (Urs Sprenger) – bass, vocals (1982–1983)
- Stephen "Evoked Damnator" Priestly (Stephen Gasser) – bass (1983)
- Mike "Grim Decapitator" Owens (Michael Baum) – bass (1983)

== Discography ==
=== Demos ===
Year	Title
1983	Death Fiend
1983	Triumph of Death
1983	Satanic Rites

=== Studio releases ===
Year	Title	Notes
1984	Apocalyptic Raids	EP
1984	Death Metal	Split
2016	Blood Insanity	Single

=== Compilation albums ===
Year	Title
2008	Demon Entrails

== Sources ==
- Bennett, J. (2009). "Procreation of the Wicked". In: Mudrian, A. (ed.), Precious Metal: Decibel Presents the Stories Behind 25 Extreme Metal Masterpieces (pp. 31–47). Cambridge, MA: Da Capo Press.
- Fischer, T. G. (2000). Are You Morbid? Into the Pandemonium of Celtic Frost. London: Sanctuary Publishing Limited.
- Gregori, D. (2003). "Thrash Metal or, How I Learned to Stop Worrying and Love the Bomb". Terrorizer 108: 10–14.
- Hellhammer (1990). Apocalyptic Raids 1990 A.D. [CD]. New York, NY: Futurist/Noise International.
