= Samael (band) =

Swiss metal band

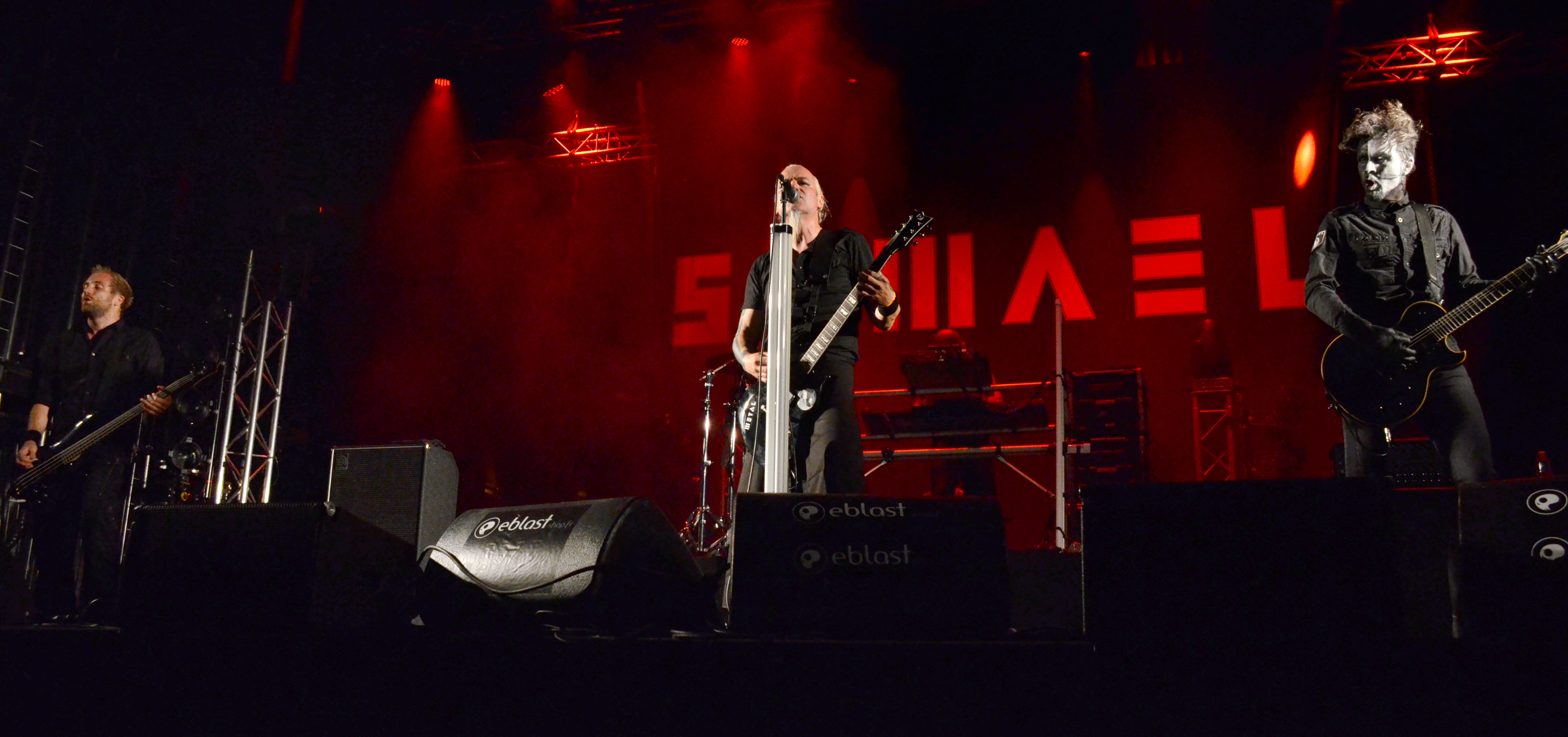
- Samael at the Fall of Summer Festival 2016

Background information
- Origin: Sion, Switzerland
- Genres: Symphonic black metal; industrial metal; black metal
- Years active: 1987–present
- Labels: Osmose; Century Media; Nuclear Blast; Galactical; Napalm
- Members: Vorph; Xy; Drop; Ales
- Past members: Pat Charvet; Rodolphe H Kaos; Mas; Makro; Zorrac
- Website: samael.info

Samael (/ˈsæməˌɛl/) is a Swiss metal band formed in Sion in 1987. Their current lineup includes founding members and brothers Vorphalack (Vorph) and Xytraguptor (Xy), guitarist Drop, and bassist Ales. Other members of the band throughout the years have been Rodolph H. (keyboards, 1993–1995), Kaos (guitar, 1996–2001), Mas (bass, 1991–2014) and Makro (guitar, 2002–2018).

Samael mixes metal, industrial, electronic and symphonic music with massive beats, martial rhythms and up-tempo or blast beat. Samael uses a drum machine in the studio and live on stage.

== History ==
The band's logo

=== Early years, Worship Him, and Blood Ritual, 1987–1993 ===
Vorphalack formed Samael in April 1987 with drummer Pat Charvet. They recorded the demo Into the Infernal Storm of Evil the following year. Charvet left the band in June 1988 and was replaced with Vorphalack's brother Xytraguptor. The siblings recorded the single Medieval Prophecy in October 1988. It included two original songs and a cover of Hellhammer's "The Third of the Storm". The band followed up with the promo tape From Dark to Black in 1989.

They played a few shows in Germany, France, Switzerland, and Poland before entering Taurus Studio in Geneva to record their first album. Samael became a trio when bassist Masmiseîm joined the band. The new formation played its first show in Poland. Worship Him (1991) became the first album that Osmose Productions released, one year after being recorded. The band played several shows to promote the album, including a short eastern tour with Napalm Death that ended with two shows in Moscow. Samael signed with Century Media and recorded their second album at T&T Studio in Gelsenkirchen, with producer Waldemar Sorychta. The band released Blood Ritual on 1 December 1992. A month later, the band toured Europe Tour with Unleashed and Tiamat. The 20-date tour ended in Belgium with an indoor festival with Fear Factory, Brutal Truth and Agnostic Front, among other bands.

=== Ceremony of Opposites and Rebellion, 1994–1995 ===
The band recorded and mixed the Waldemar Sorychta-produced Ceremony of Opposites at Woodhouse Studios in Hagen (Germany). They released it on 18 February 1994. Rodolph H joined the band and played keyboards in every song. A The album included samples, notably the voice of Aleister Crowley on "Crown" and the beginning of "The Hut on the Hen's Legs (Baba Yaga)" of the Pictures at an Exhibition from Modest Mussorgsky in "Baphomet's Throne". The record featured aggressive guitars, keyboard orchestration, metallic drums, and screaming vocals.

Martin Eric Ain (Celtic Frost) invited the band to play at the Lucifer Rising convention in Zurich in March, before they joined the Full of Hate Festival tour headlined by Morbid Angel and Cannibal Corpse. They shot a video for the song "Baphomet's Throne" during that tour. The tour was followed by Samael's first headliner tour in Europe with Grave, Massacra and Therion as support. That year, the band played 23 dates in the U.S. East Coast supporting Cannibal Corpse, and continued that tour in Europe for another 41 shows.

The band recorded the Rebellion mini album in February 1995. Two new tracks, two re-arranged songs and a cover version of "I Love the Dead" from Alice Cooper. "Static Journey" were the first songs Samael recorded with programmed drums. The Rebellion Tour started in Europe with Sentenced and ended with two shows in Mexico.

=== Passage and Exodus, 1996–1998 ===
The band worked with a drum machine after Rodolph left the band. Xy moved to the keyboards and programmed the drums parts. Kaos joined the band as second guitarist. The band went back to Woodhouse Studios for a three-week session. The first show with the drum machine and new line up was on 26 June in Z7 in Pratteln (Switzerland), opening for Kreator. The following day, Samael played at With Full Force festival alongside Ministry, Motörhead, and Front Line Assembly. The band released Passage on 19 August 1996 and toured Europe with support from Moonspell and Rotting Christ. Director Andreas Marshall shot a video was shot in Berlin for the song "Jupiterian Vibe".

Samael co-headlined the 1997 Full of Hate Festival tour with Obituary, Entombed, Crowbar and Strapping Young Lad completed the line up. Later on that year they took part in another tour festival across Germany alongside Kreator, Sodom, Exodus, Grip Inc. and In Flames. That summer the band played for the first and only time at Dynamo Open Air in Eindhoven as well as Wacken, Grasspop, and With Full Force festival. In the meantime Xy released on his own label a neo classical version of Passage under the name Xytras. Exodus mini album was released in April 1998, in June Samael played in Istanbul with Kreator.

=== Eternal, Black Trip DVD, 1999–2003 ===
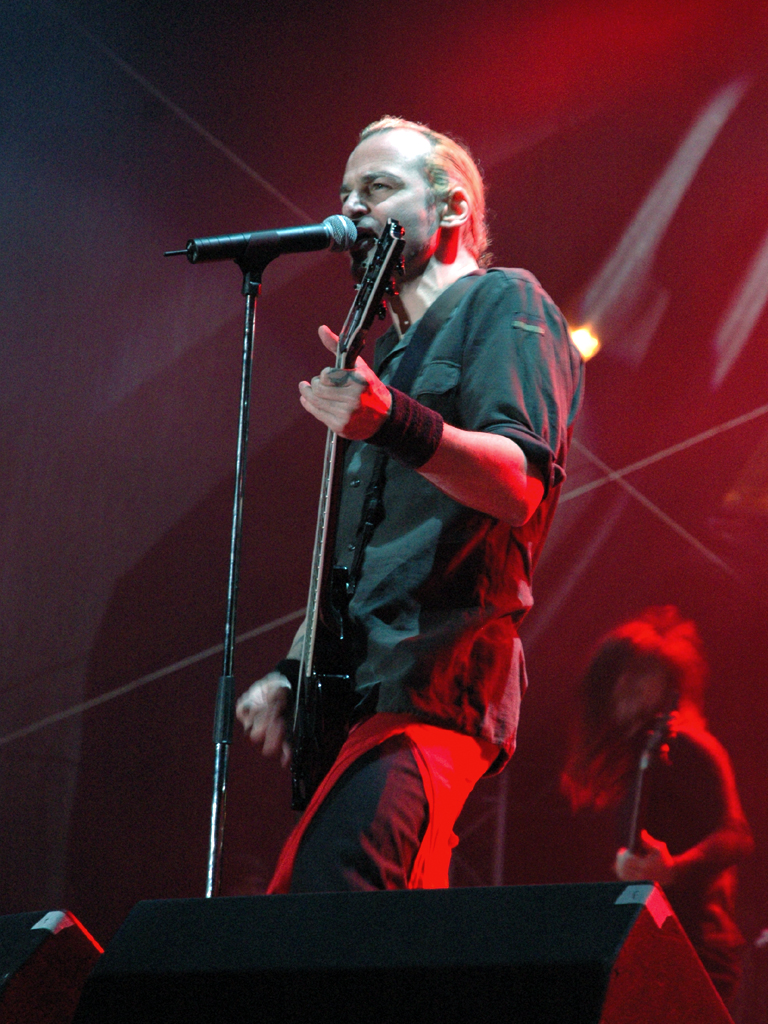
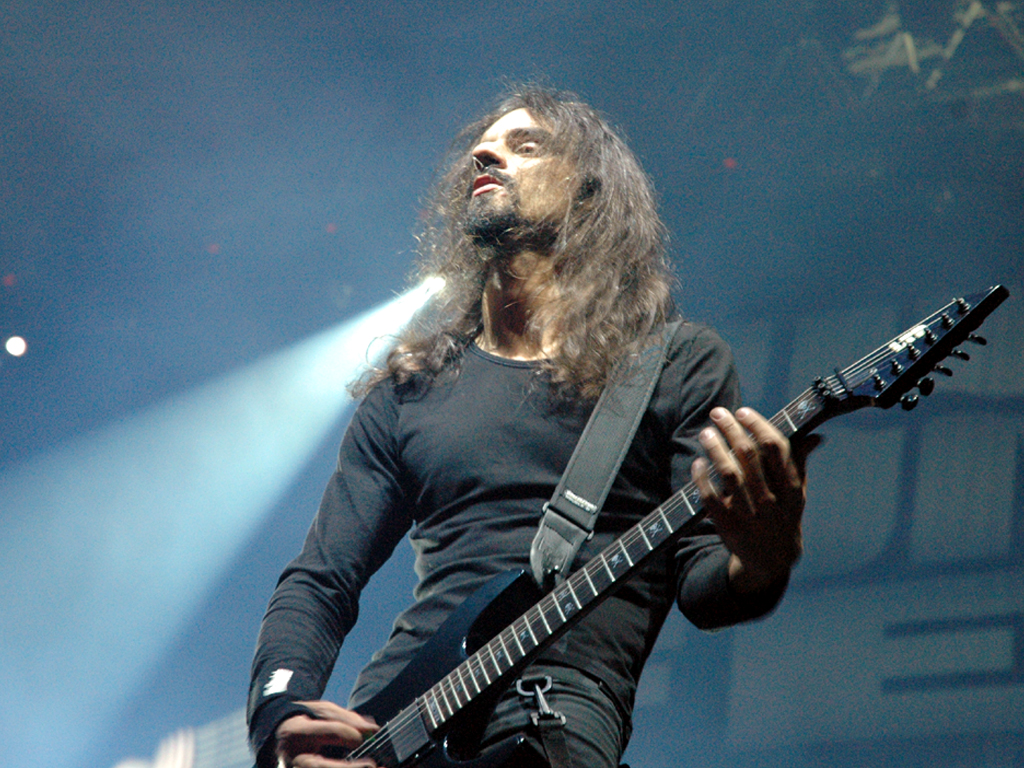
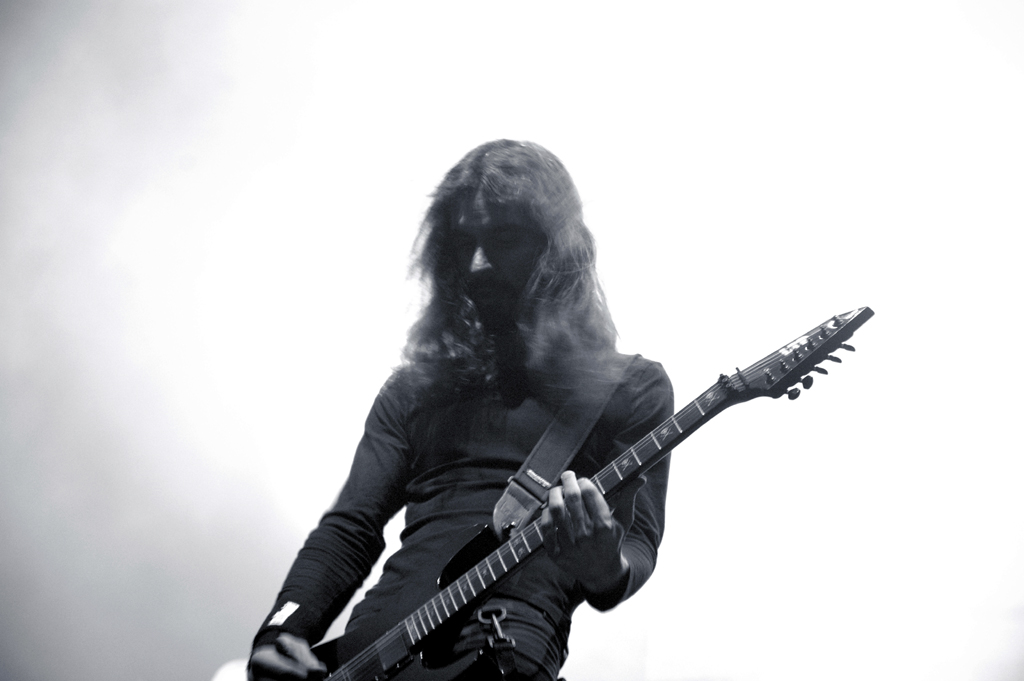
Samael performing in 2007

In Montreux (Switzerland) at the Mountain Studios, Samael recorded their new album with rock producer David Richards. The sound and the overall production of Eternal was very much rooted in the 1970s while the approach of the songs was very contemporary. The gap between the opening song "Year Zero" and "Infra Galaxia" or between the Deep Purple sounding "Radiant Star" and the electronic stamped "Ways" is very wide. The band toured in Europe with Grip Inc. and Lacuna Coil before going to the US with Dimmu Borgir, Monstrosity and Epoch of Unlight. The following summer they played with Iron Maiden at Artefact Fest in France.

Early 2002 Kaos departed from the band and was replaced by Makro. With the new line-up, the band played a couple of shows before the Summer Breeze Open Air which became the core of Samael's first DVD Black Trip. In the meantime, Vorph and Xy worked on an electronic project which was released in 2006 under the name Era One. In January 2003 Samael was back on the road with Cathedral and Without Face for the Redemption Tour, the tour then went to the US with Strapping Young Lad and Cathedral as supporting acts.

=== Reign of Light and Solar Soul, 2004–2008 ===
Reign of Light was recorded and mixed during the summer 2004, first single "Telephath" came with a video and was released in September, the album was out in October. The band toured Europe with support acts Flowing Tears for the first part of the tour and Dagoba for the Scandinavian dates. Samael later supported Oomph! in Germany. The next year, the single "On Earth" which featured a cover of "I Feel you" from Depeche Mode was released. The band played summer festivals in Europe and Switzerland. In Paleo Festival in Nyon (Switzerland) they played before Rammstein, four songs of that performance ended up on a bonus DVD for a special edition of Reign of Light. In Paris, the band received an award from Hard rock magazine for best industrial album. After a European tour with Obituary the band finished recording their following album.

In March 2007 Samael opened for Iggy Pop in Montana (Switzerland) where they played two new songs for the first time: "On the Rise", and "Slavocracy". Solar Soul was mixed in Sweden by Stefan Glaumann and was released on 1 June through Nuclear Blast worldwide. In July they played with Nine Inch Nails at Rock Oz'Arenes. Samael played at Wacken Open Air in August 2007. In March 2008 they were back on the road with Gothminister and Sybreed. During the summer Vorph and Xy went to Sweden to mix with Frederic Nordström a side project that was recorded a long time ago. In September they returned to the US with Amorphis and Virgin Black. After that tour, as the final mastering for the side project was done it was decided that it would become the next Samael album.

=== Above and Lux Mundi, 2009–2016 ===
Above was released on 6 March 2009. It was described by the band as a tribute to their metal roots and they listed some of their influences on the CD booklet: Kiss, AC/DC, Venom, Slayer, Iron Maiden, Metallica, Impaled Nazarene, Motörhead, Black Sabbath, Bathory. Faster and more extreme than anything Samael released previously, the album surprised the critics and fans alike but it sent the band on a 90 more dates tour. First in Europe with Deicide, Vader, Devian and The Amenta, then in the US with Carcass, Suicide Silence and Psycroptic, and finally all across Europe with Paradise Lost and Ghost Brigade.

Lux Mundi was co produced by Xy and Waldemar Sorychta, it was recorded in Switzerland and mixed in England by Russ Russel. First the band released a mini album Antigod which featured two live tracks, a remix and new version of the song "Into the Pentagram" from their first album Worship Him (1991). Samael toured in Europe with Finntroll and Rotting Christ in support of that mini album. A video was shot in Sweden by Patrick Ulaeus for the song "Luxferre" (Latin for "light carrier"). On 29 April 2011 Lux Mundi was released. The band later toured in Europe with Keep of Kalessin and Melechesh.

Xy was asked by the city of Sion (Switzerland) to compose a piece of music for a sound and light show to be played in two consecutive summers. Recorded in Prague with 100 classical musicians that piece of music was released on CD under the name Sedunum. In 2013, Samael played the album Passage in its entirety at Inferno Festival Switzerland and at Metal Hammer Paradise in Germany. Bass player and long time Samael member Mas left the band in November 2014, he was replaced by Drop (ex-Sybreed).

20 years after it was first released, Samael celebrated their album Ceremony of Opposites (1994) by playing the entire album live over 40 times in festivals in Europe and US and with short tours in Canada, Russia and Poland. The fact that the album was performed with a drum machine instead of real drums like it was on the original recording created a polemic within the older fans of the band.

=== Hegemony, 2017–present ===
In May 2017 the members of Samael launched a side project W.A.R. (Worship and Ritual), in order to perform their first two, more primitive black metal albums, live. In this group, the original members adopted their old stage names (Vorphalack and Xytraguptor) and Xy returned to playing drums. The first W.A.R. concerts happened in Les Caves du Manoir in Martigny (Switzerland) were the band performed for two consecutive nights.

The new album Hegemony was released on 13 October 2017. Beforehand, the band released lyrics video for the songs "Angel of Wrath" and "Red Planet", and a video for "Black Supremacy". In early 2018, a video with live footage was released for Rite of Renewal.

== Band members ==
Current

- Michael "Vorph" Locher – guitars, vocals (1987–present)
- Alexandre "Xytras" Locher – drums, drum programming, keyboards, samples (1988–present)
- Thomas "Drop" Betrisey – guitars (2018–present), bass (2015–2018)
- Ales Campanelli – bass (2020–present)

Former

- Pat Charvet – drums (1987–1988)
- Rodolphe "H." Bellina – keyboards, samples (1993–1996)
- Frédéric "Kaos" Miniutti – guitars (1996–2002)
- Christophe "Mas" Mermod – bass (1991–2015)
- Marco "Makro" Rivao – guitars (2002–2018)
- Pierre "Zorrac" Carroz – bass (2018–2020)

== Discography ==
Studio albums

- Worship Him (1991)
- Blood Ritual (1992)
- Ceremony of Opposites (1994)
- Passage (1996)
- Eternal (1999)
- Reign of Light (2004)
- Solar Soul (2007)
- Above (2009)
- Lux Mundi (2011)
- Hegemony (2017)
