= Rebellion (EP) =

EP by Samael
- Released: 23 May 1995
- Recorded: Woodhouse Studio, Hagen, Germany, February 1995
- Genre: Black metal, industrial metal
- Length: 34:40/37:17
- Label: Century Media
- Producer: Waldemar Sorychta, Xy

Samael chronology
Ceremony of Opposites (1994)	Rebellion (1995)	Passage (1996)

Rebellion is an EP by Swiss heavy metal band Samael. It was rated 1.5 stars by AllMusic.

== Track listing ==
1. "Rebellion" - 3:26
2. "After the Sepulture (New Version)" - 3:31
3. "I Love the Dead" (Alice Cooper cover) - 3:32
4. "Static Journey" (instrumental) - 6:02
5. "To Our Martyrs (New Version)" (cassette edition bonus track) - 2:37
6. "Into the Pentagram (New Version)" - 4:24
7. Unlisted hidden track - 13:46

The hidden track starts with an electronic instrumental outro, then after silence from 3:31 to 7:42 is a version of "Static Journey" with German vocals.
