= Reign of Light =

Studio album by Samael
- Released: 11 October 2004
- Recorded: 2004
- Studio: The Cube; The Albertine; Switzerland
- Genre: Industrial metal, symphonic metal
- Length: 42:32
- Label: Galactical, Regain
- Producer: Samael, Waldemar Sorychta

Samael chronology
Eternal (1999)	Reign of Light (2004)	Era One (2006)

Singles from Reign of Light
- 1. "Telepath" Released: 27 September 2004; 2. "On Earth" Released: 13 June 2005

Professional ratings
Review scores
Source	Rating
AllMusic	3/5 stars
Chronicles of Chaos	8/10
Last Rites	Favorable
Rock Hard	9/10

Reign of Light is the sixth album by Swiss industrial metal band Samael, released on 11 October 2004 by Galactical. The band made a video for the first single "Telepath", directed by Roger Johansson and Alex Hansson. It was shot in Gothenburg and slated for release in January 2005.

== Track listing ==
All lyrics are written by Vorph; all music is composed by Xy.

No.	Title	Length
1.	"Moongate"	3:31
2.	"Inch'Allah"	3:29
3.	"High Above"	3:58
4.	"Reign of Light"	3:51
5.	"On Earth"	4:03
6.	"Telepath"	3:35
7.	"Oriental Dawn"	4:24
8.	"As the Sun"	3:40
9.	"Further"	3:59
10.	"Heliopolis"	3:57
11.	"Door of Celestial Peace"	4:05

== Personnel ==
=== Samael ===
- Vorph – guitar, vocals, production
- Makro – guitar, production
- Mas – bass, production
- Xy – programming, keyboard, percussion, production

=== Additional musicians ===
- Sami Yli-Sirniö – sitar
- Sandra Schleret – vocals

=== Technical personnel ===
- Waldemar Sorychta – production
- D-Teck – engineering
- Totor – engineering
- Yves Métry – engineering
- Stefan Glaumann – mixing
- Staffan Celmins – assistant mixing
- Björn Engelman – mastering
- Le Seigneur des Marais – front cover, layout
- Sedrik Nemeth – eyes pictures
- Edi Maurer – band picture

== Charts ==
Chart (2004)	Peak position
French Albums (SNEP)	153
Swiss Albums (Schweizer Hitparade)	66
