= Eternal (Samael album) =

Studio album by Samael
- Released: 19 July 1999
- Recorded: 1999
- Studio: Mountain, Montreux, Switzerland
- Genre: Industrial metal; symphonic black metal
- Length: 47:25
- Label: Century Media
- Producer: Samael

Samael chronology
| Exodus (1998) | Eternal (1999) | Reign of Light (2004) |

Professional ratings
Review scores
| Source | Rating |
|---|---|
| AllMusic | 2.5/5 stars |
| Chronicles of Chaos | 8/10 |
| Release | 6/10 |
| Rock Hard | 9.5/10 |

Eternal is the fifth album by the Swiss heavy metal band Samael, released on 19 July 1999 via Century Media.

== Track listing ==
All lyrics are written by Vorph; all music is composed by Xy.

| No. | Title | Length |
|---|---|---|
| 1. | "Year Zero" | 3:38 |
| 2. | "Ailleurs" | 3:55 |
| 3. | "Together" | 4:28 |
| 4. | "Ways" | 3:49 |
| 5. | "The Cross" | 3:21 |
| 6. | "Us" | 4:15 |
| 7. | "Supra Karma" | 4:33 |
| 8. | "I" | 4:01 |
| 9. | "Nautilus & Zeppelin" | 4:12 |
| 10. | "Infra Galaxia" | 4:12 |
| 11. | "Being" | 3:12 |
| 12. | "Radiant Star" | 3:47 |

2007 re-release bonus tracks
| No. | Title | Length |
|---|---|---|
| 13. | "Ways (1st mix)" |
| 14. | "Ailleurs (Alternative Mix)" |
| 15. | "Infra Galaxia (Alternative Mix)" |
| 16. | "Us (Instrumental)" |
| 17. | "The Cross (Instrumental)" |
| 18. | "I (Instrumental)" |
| 19. | "Ways (Drum 'n' Bass Mix)" |

== Personnel ==
=== Samael ===
- Vorph – guitar, vocals, production
- Kaos – guitar, production
- Masmiseim – bass, production
- Xytras – keyboard, drums, percussion, production

=== Technical personnel ===
- David Richards – recording, engineering, mixing
- Kris Fredriksson – assistant engineering
- Rodrigue Pellaud – front cover artwork, fractals
- Carsten Drescher – layout, design
- Tony Cousins – mastering

== Chart positions ==
| Chart (1999) | Peak position |
|---|---|
| German Albums (Offizielle Top 100) | 59 |
