= Triumph of Death (Hellhammer demo) =

Demo album by Hellhammer
- Released: July 1983
- Recorded: June 1983
- Genre: Thrash metal; black metal
- Length: 46:12
- Producer: Hellhammer

Hellhammer chronology
| Death Fiend (1983) | Triumph of Death (1983) | Satanic Rites (1983) |

Triumph of Death is a demo tape by Swiss extreme metal band Hellhammer, self-released in July 1983. It was recorded by producer Rol Fuchs in the band's rehearsal room on portable equipment sometime in June 1983, along with the material for the unreleased Death Fiend demo. The two demos were typically combined into one, simply called Triumph of Death. Along with Hellhammer's other demos, it had a major influence on the emerging death metal and black metal genres.

In 2019, Tom Gabriel Fischer resurrected Hellhammer by establishing the band Triumph Of Death, named after this, as a tribute to Hellhammer's legacy. The band has been playing around the world ever since and released a live album in 2023, called Resurrection Of The Flesh.

== Track listing ==
Original demo tape version, 1983

- Side 1:
1. "Crucifixion" – 3:02 *, †
2. "Maniac" – 4:00 †
3. "(Execution) When Hell's Near" – 2:37 *, †
4. "Decapitator" – 2:06 *, †
5. "Blood Insanity" – 4:21 *
6. "Power of Satan" – 4:09 †
- Side 2:
1. "Reaper" – 2:06 †
2. "Death Fiend" – 2:34 *
3. "Triumph of Death" – 5:14 *, †
4. "Metallic Storm" – 2:19 *
5. "Ready for Slaughter" – 3:35 †
6. "Dark Warriors" – 3:02 †
7. "Hammerhead" – 2:47 *

Vinyl re-release with tracks from Death Fiend, 1990

1. "Angel of Destruction" – 2:58 †
2. "Crucifixion" – 3:02 *, †
3. "Ready for Slaughter" – 3:35 †
4. "Death Fiend" – 2:34 *
5. "(Execution) When Hell's Near" – 2:37 *, †
6. "Chainsaw" – 3:57 *
7. "Sweet Torment" – 2:08 †
8. "Hammerhead" – 2:47 *
9. "Blood Insanity" – 4:21 *
10. "Reaper" – 2:06 †
11. "Maniac" – 4:00 †
12. "Triumph of Death" – 5:14 *, †
13. "Bloody Pussies" – 4:58 *
14. "Power of Satan" – 4:09 †
15. "Decapitator" – 2:06 *, †
16. "Dark Warriors" – 3:02 †
17. "Metallic Storm" – 2:19 *

== Credits ==
- Thomas Gabriel Fischer a.k.a. Tom Warrior – vocals on †, guitars
- Urs Sprenger a.k.a. Steve Warrior – vocals on *, bass
- Jörg Neubart a.k.a. Bruce Day – drums
