= Passage (Samael album) =

Studio album by Samael
- Released: 19 August 1996
- Recorded: 1996
- Studio: Woodhouse Studios (Hagen, Germany)
- Genre: Symphonic black metal, industrial metal
- Length: 42:17
- Label: Century Media
- Producer: Waldemar Sorychta

Samael chronology
Rebellion (1995)	Passage (1996)	Exodus (1998)

Professional ratings
Review scores
Source	Rating
AllMusic	4.5/5 stars
Chronicles of Chaos	9/10
Rock Hard	9.5/10
Sputnikmusic	4.5/5 stars

Passage is the fourth album by Swiss industrial metal band Samael, released on 19 August 1996 through Century Media.

On this album, the band opted for more intensive use of keyboards and industrial sounds, drifting from their black metal roots and progressing in a different direction. Lyrically the band abandoned satanic themes and veered more towards the occult and the cosmic.

While it differs from its predecessors, Passage can be credited for thrusting Samael from the underground scene and giving the band a much larger international audience.

The album was originally recorded with a 17-song track list but was later cut down to 11. The remaining songs can be found on the album Exodus. A second edition was later offered containing 10 classical piano compositions from the album on a second disk.

In 2007, a remastered, re-packaged, special edition was released containing the album's original 17 song track list.

Over a decade after its original release is still considered by many to be a pillar in the black/industrial metal genre.

A video for "Jupiterian Vibe" received regular airplay on MTV's Headbangers Ball.

== Track listing ==
All lyrics are written by Vorph; all music is composed by Xy.

No.	Title	Length
1.	"Rain"	4:01
2.	"Shining Kingdom"	3:37
3.	"Angel's Decay"	3:37
4.	"My Saviour"	4:09
5.	"Jupiterian Vibe"	3:23
6.	"The Ones Who Came Before"	3:42
7.	"Liquid Soul Dimension"	3:42
8.	"Moonskin"	3:57
9.	"Born Under Saturn"	4:18
10.	"Chosen Race"	4:08
11.	"A Man in Your Head"	3:43

== Personnel ==
=== Samael ===
- Vorph – vocals, guitar
- Kaos – guitar
- Masmiseîm – bass
- Xy – keyboard, synthesizer, live & programmed drums

=== Technical personnel ===
- Waldemar Sorychta – production, engineering

== Chart positions ==
Chart (1996)	Peak position
German Albums (Offizielle Top 100)	84
