= Michael Locher =

Swiss musician (born 1969)

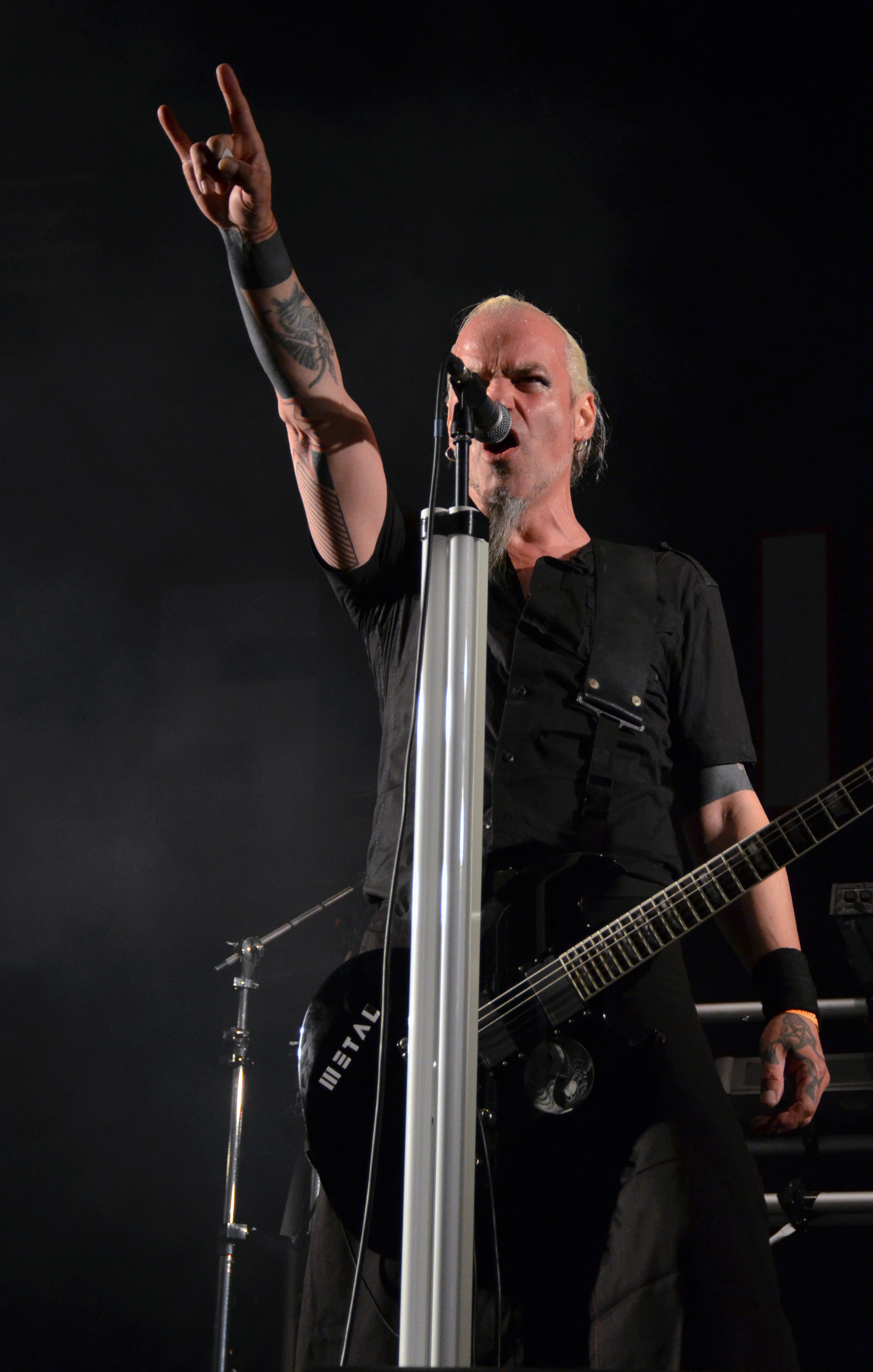
- Vorph at the Fall of Summer Festival 2016

Background information
- Also known as: Vorphalack, Vorph
- Born: 7 January 1969 (age 57); Sion, Switzerland
- Genres: Industrial metal, black metal
- Occupation: Musician
- Instruments: Guitar, vocals
- Years active: 1987–present
- Labels: Osmose, Century Media, Nuclear Blast, Galactical

Michael Locher (born 7 January 1969), also known as Vorphalack or simply Vorph, is a Swiss musician who provides vocals and is a guitarist for the industrial/black metal band Samael.

== Biography ==
Locher was born in Sion. He co-founded Samael in 1987 with his brother Alexandre (also known as "Xytras" or "Xy") on drums. Locher's musical influences include Celtic Frost, Slayer, Iron Maiden, Motörhead, Venom, Bathory and early Possessed. He particularly points to Bathory as a source of inspiration for vocals:

Quorthon from Bathory for the vocals I think was a big influence. To me, at that time, he was probably the guy who pushed the boundaries the furthest in terms of that style of music.

— Michael Locher a.k.a. Vorph

His guitar is a customized ESP Viper with Ernie Ball guitar strings, Boss GT pro, Mesa Boogie Dual Rectifier. During Samael's black metal period, Vorph (then called Vorphalack) played a Jackson King V guitar too. During the Passage era Vorph played a black Jackson Kelly.

Vorph stated in an interview with Dutch webzine Lords of Metal that he does not eat junk food and that he is a vegetarian.
