= Anesidora =

Anesidora (Ancient Greek: Ἀνησιδώρα) was in Greek and Roman mythology an epithet of several goddesses and mythological figures. The name itself means "sender of gifts".

== Mythology ==
- Gaia
- Pandora
- Demeter

== Other uses ==
- Anesidora, a fictional ship in the Alien franchise; see Alien: Isolation
