= List of Alien (franchise) characters =

Main cast of 1979's Alien (left to right: Ian Holm, Harry Dean Stanton, Sigourney Weaver, Yaphet Kotto, Tom Skerritt, Veronica Cartwright and John Hurt)

Alien, a science-fiction action horror franchise, tells the story of humanity's ongoing encounters with Aliens (xenomorphs): a hostile, endoparasitoid, extraterrestrial species. Set between the 21st and 24th centuries over several generations, the film series revolves around a character ensemble's struggle for survival against the Aliens and against the greedy, unscrupulous megacorporation Weyland-Yutani.

The original series consists of four films, Alien (1979), Aliens (1986), Alien 3 (1992) and Alien Resurrection (1997), and revolves around Ellen Ripley's fight against the xenomorphs (aliens) as well as that of her clone. Ripley is the sole survivor of a xenomorph rampage on the space freighter Nostromo, which leads her to a series of conflicts with the species and Weyland-Yutani. Ripley's struggle is the plot of the original series.

The prequel series, Prometheus (2012) and Alien: Covenant (2017), depicts humanity's genesis at the hands of an ancient extraterrestrial race known as the Engineers and the indirect creators of the xenomorphs. A deadly mutagen developed by the Engineers is discovered, which is weaponized by the android David 8, to recreate and perfect the previously long-extinct xenomorph strain. The evolution of the xenomorphs is the main plot of the prequel series.

Several novel series also continue the storylines of characters from the film series, including Alien: Out of the Shadows (2014), Aliens: Vasquez (2019), and Aliens: Bishop (2023). The video game Alien: Isolation (2014), the film Alien: Romulus (2024), and the television series Alien: Earth (2025) explore stand-alone storylines.

== Overview ==
List indicators

This section includes characters who will appear or have appeared in the franchise.

- An empty grey cell indicates the character was not in the film, or that the character's official presence has not yet been confirmed.
- ^{C} indicates a cameo role.
- ^{E} indicates an appearance not included in the theatrical cut.
- ^{MC} indicates a motion-capture-only role.
- ^{P} indicates an appearance in onscreen photographs.
- ^{U} indicates an uncredited appearance.
- ^{V} indicates a voice-only role.
- ^{Y} indicates a younger version of the character.

| Character | Films | | | | | | | Web series | Television series | Alien: The Audible Original Dramas | | | |
| Character | Alien | Aliens | Alien 3 | Alien Resurrection | Prometheus | Alien: Covenant | Alien: Romulus | Alien: Isolation – The Digital Series | Alien: Earth | Alien: Out of the Shadows | Alien: River of Pain | Sea of Sorrows | Alien 3 |
|---|---|---|---|---|---|---|---|---|---|---|---|---|---|
| Character | 1979 | 1986 | 1992 | 1997 | 2012 | 2017 | 2024 | 2019 | 2025 | 2016 | 2017 | 2018 | 2019 |
=== Main characters ===
| Ellen Ripley | Sigourney Weaver | Sigourney Weaver | Sigourney Weaver | Sigourney Weaver | | | Mentioned | Andrea Deck^{V} | | Laurel Lefkow^{V} | Laurel Lefkow^{V} | Laurel Lefkow^{V} | Laurel Lefkow^{V} |
| Aliens | Bolaji Badejo | Carl Toop | Tom Woodruff Jr. | Tom Woodruff Jr. | Appeared | Andrew Crawford Goran D. Kleut | Trevor Newlin Robert Bobroczkyi | Appeared | Appeared | Appeared | Appeared | Appeared | Appeared |
| Ash | Ian Holm | Ian Holm^{P} | | | | | Ian Holm digital effect | | | Rutger Hauer^{V} | | | |
| Bishop II Michael Bishop Weyland | | Lance Henriksen | Lance Henriksen | | | | | | | | | | Lance Henriksen^{V} |
| Rebecca "Newt" Jorden | | Carrie Henn | Danielle Edmond | | | | | | | Mairead Doherty^{V} | | Mairead Doherty^{V} | |
| Dwayne Hicks | | Michael Biehn | Michael Biehn^{P} | | | | | | | | | | Michael Biehn^{V} |
| Anne Jorden | | Holly De Jong | | | | | | | | | Anna Friel^{V} | | |
| Amanda "Amy" Ripley-McClaren | | Elizabeth Inglis^{E}^{P} | | | | | | Andrea Deck^{V} Kezia Burrows^{MC} | | | | | |
| Ripley 8 | | | | Sigourney Weaver Nicole Fellows^{Y} | | | | | | | | Laurel Lefkow^{V} | |
| Elizabeth M. Shaw | | | | | Noomi Rapace Lucy Hutchinson^{Y} | Noomi Rapace^{U}^{P} | | | | | | | |
| David^{8} | | | | | Michael Fassbender | Michael Fassbender | | | | | | | |
| Peter Weyland | | | | | Guy Pearce | Guy Pearce^{U} | | | | Guy Pearce^{V} | | | |
| Charlie Holloway | | | | | Logan Marshall-Green | Logan Marshall-Green^{P} | | | | | | | |
=== Introduced in Alien (1979) ===
| Arthur Dallas | Tom Skerritt | Tom Skerritt^{P} | | | | | Mentioned | | | | | | |
| Joan Lambert | Veronica Cartwright | Veronica Cartwright^{P} | | | | | Mentioned | | | | | | |
| Samuel Brett | Harry Dean Stanton | Harry Dean Stanton^{P} | | | | | Mentioned | | | | | | |
| Gilbert Kane | John Hurt | John Hurt^{P} | | | | | Mentioned | | | | | | |
| Dennis Parker | Yaphet Kotto | Yaphet Kotto^{P} | | | | | Mentioned | | | | | | |
| MU / TH / UR 6000 "Mother / Father" | Helen Horton^{V} | | | Steven Gilborn^{V} | | Lorelei King^{V} | Annemarie Griggs^{V} ( MU/TH/UR 9000 ) | | Robin August^{V} | Tom Alexander^{V} | | Lorelei King^{V} | |
| Jones | Various animal performers | Various animal performers | | | | | | | Various animal performers | Various animal performers | | | |
| Engineers | Appeared | | | | Ian Whyte John Lebar Daniel James | Appeared | Appeared | | | | | | |
=== Introduced in Aliens (1986) ===
| Lieutenant Scott Gorman | | William Hope | | | | | | | | William Hope^{V} | | | |
| Al Simpson | | Mac McDonald | | | | | | | | Mac McDonald^{V} | | | |
| Jernigan | | Stuart Milligan | | | | | | | | Stuart Milligan^{V} | | | |
| Russ Jorden | | Jay Benedict | | | | | | | | Marc Warren^{V} | | | |
| Timmy Jorden | | Christopher Henn | | | | | | | | Matt Keith Rauch^{V} | | | |
| Hicks | | Michael Biehn | | | | | | | | | | | |
| Hudson | | Bill Paxton | | | | | | | | | | | |
| Carter J. Burke | | Paul Reiser | | | | | | | | | | | |
| Frost | | Ricco Ross | | | | | | | | | | | |
| Sergeant Apone | | Al Matthews | | | | | | | | | | | |
| Vasquez | | Jenette Goldstein | | | | | | | | | | | |
| Drake | | Mark Rolston | | | | | | | | | | | |
| Private Spunkmeyer | | Daniel Kash | | | | | | | | | | | |
| Crowe | | Tip Tipping | | | | | | | | | | | |
| Wierzbowski | | Trevor Steedman | | | | | | | | | | | |
| Corporal Dietrich | | Cynthia Dale Scott | | | | | | | | | | | |
| Corporal Ferro | | Colette Hiller | | | | | | | | | | | |
| Van Leuwen | | Paul Maxwell | | | | | | | | | | | |
| Cocooned Colonist | | Barbara Coles | | | | | | | | | | | |
=== Introduced in Alien 3 (1992) ===
| Leonard Dillon | | | Charles S. Dutton | | | | | | | | | | |
| Jonathan Clemens | | | Charles Dance | | | | | | | | | | |
| Harold Andrews | | | Brian Glover | | | | | | | | | | |
| Francis Aaron | | | Ralph Brown | | | | | | | | | | |
| Walter Golic | | | Paul McGann | | | | | | | | | | |
| Robert Morse | | | Danny Webb | | | | | | | | | | |
| David Postlethwaite | | | Pete Postlethwaite | | | | | | | | | | |
| Ted "Junior" Gillas | | | Holt McCallany | | | | | | | | | | |
| Peter Gregor | | | Peter Guinness | | | | | | | | | | |
| Thomas Murphy | | | Christopher Fairbank | | | | | | | | | | |
| Kevin Dodd | | | Phil Davis | | | | | | | | | | |
| Alan Jude | | | Vincenzo Nicoli | | | | | | | | | | |
| Edward Boggs | | | Leon Herbert | | | | | | | | | | |
| Daniel Rains | | | Christopher John Fields | | | | | | | | | | |
| Eric Buggy | | | Niall Buggy | | | | | | | | | | |
| Company Man | | | Hi Ching | | | | | | | | | | |
| Frank Elgyn | | | Carl Chase | | | | | | | | | | |
| Clive William | | | Clive Mantle | | | | | | | | | | |
| Arthur Walkingstick | | | DeObia Oparei | | | | | | | | | | |
| Yoshi Troy | | | Paul Brennen | | | | | | | | | | |
=== Introduced in Alien Resurrection (1997) ===
| Ripley 8 | | | | Sigourney Weaver Nicole Fellows^{Y} | | | | | | | | | |
| Annalee Call | | | | Winona Ryder | | | | | | | | | |
| Dom Vriess | | | | Dominique Pinon | | | | | | | | | |
| Ron Johner | | | | Ron Perlman | | | | | | | | | |
| Gary Christie | | | | Gary Dourdan | | | | | | | | | |
| Frank Elgyn | | | | Michael Wincott | | | | | | | | | |
| Sabra Hillard | | | | Kim Flowers | | | | | | | | | |
| General Martin Perez | | | | Dan Hedaya | | | | | | | | | |
| Dr. Mason Wren | | | | J. E. Freeman | | | | | | | | | |
| Dr. Jonathan Gediman | | | | Brad Dourif | | | | | | | | | |
| Vincent DiStephano | | | | Raymond Cruz | | | | | | | | | |
| Larry Purvis | | | | Leland Orser | | | | | | | | | |
| Anesthesiologist | | | | Carolyn Campbell | | | | | | | | | |
| Dr. Carlyn Williamson | | | | Marlene Bush | | | | | | | | | |
| Dr. Dan Sprague | | | | David St. James | | | | | | | | | |
| Father | | | | Steven Gilborn^{V} | | | | | | | | | |
=== Introduced in Prometheus (2012) ===
| Meredith Vickers | | | | | Charlize Theron | | | | | | | | |
| Janek | | | | | Idris Elba | | | | | | | | |
| Fifield | | | | | Sean Harris | | | | | | | | |
| Millburn | | | | | Rafe Spall | | | | | | | | |
| Ford | | | | | Kate Dickie | | | | | | | | |
| Chance | | | | | Emun Elliott | | | | | | | | |
| Ravel | | | | | Benedict Wong | | | | | | | | |
| Mr. Shaw | | | | | Patrick Wilson | | | | | | | | |
=== Introduced in Alien: Covenant (2017) ===
| Walter One | | | | | | Michael Fassbender | | | | | | | |
| Katherine "Danny" Daniels | | | | | | Katherine Waterston | | | | | | | |
| Christopher "Chris" Oram | | | | | | Billy Crudup | | | | | | | |
| Tennessee "Tee" Faris | | | | | | Danny McBride | | | | | | | |
| Dan Lope | | | | | | Demián Bichir | | | | | | | |
| Karine Oram | | | | | | Carmen Ejogo | | | | | | | |
| Ricks | | | | | | Jussie Smollett | | | | | | | |
| Upworth | | | | | | Callie Hernandez | | | | | | | |
| Maggie Faris | | | | | | Amy Seimetz | | | | | | | |
| Tom Hallett | | | | | | Nathaniel Dean | | | | | | | |
| Ankor | | | | | | Alexander England | | | | | | | |
| Ledward | | | | | | Benjamin Rigby | | | | | | | |
| Cole | | | | | | Uli Latukefu | | | | | | | |
| Sarah Rosenthal | | | | | | Tess Haubrich | | | | | | | |
| Captain Jacob Branson | | | | | | James Franco | | | | | | | |
=== Introduced in Alien: Romulus (2024) ===
| Rain Carradine | | | | | | | Cailee Spaeny | | | | | | |
| Andy Carradine | | | | | | | David Jonsson | | | | | | |
| Tyler Harrison | | | | | | | Archie Renaux | | | | | | |
| Kay Harrison | | | | | | | Isabela Merced | | | | | | |
| Bjorn | | | | | | | Spike Fearn | | | | | | |
| Navarro | | | | | | | Aileen Wu | | | | | | |
| Rook | | | | | | | Ian Holm^{P} Daniel Betts^{V} | | | | | | |
| Offspring | | | | | | | Robert Bobroczkyi | | | | | | |
=== Introduced in Alien: Isolation (2019) ===
| Christopher Samuels | | | | | | | | Anthony Howell | | | | | |
| Nina Taylor | | | | | | | | Emerald O'Hanrahan | | | | | |
| Henry Marlow | | | | | | | | Sean Gilder | | | | | |
| Ricardo | | | | | | | | Richie Campbell Syrus Lowe^{MC} | | | | | |
| Colonial Marshal Waits | | | | | | | | William Hope | | | | | |
| Diane Verlaine | | | | | | | | Jane Perry | | | | | |
| Axel | | | | | | | | George Anton | | | | | |
| Catherine Foster | | | | | | | | Melanie Gutteridge | | | | | |
=== Introduced in Alien: Earth (2025) ===
| Wendy | | | | | | | | | Sydney Chandler | | | | |
| Joe Hermit | | | | | | | | | Alex Lawther | | | | |
| Boy Kavalier | | | | | | | | | Samuel Blenkin | | | | |
| Dame Sylvia | | | | | | | | | Essie Davis | | | | |
| Slightly | | | | | | | | | Adarsh Gourav | | | | |
| Tootles | | | | | | | | | Kit Young | | | | |
| Kirsh | | | | | | | | | Timothy Olyphant | | | | |

== Introduced in Alien (1979) ==
=== Ellen Ripley ===
Ellen Louise Ripley (Sigourney Weaver) is the primary protagonist of the main Alien series. The mother of Amanda Ripley and a warrant officer on the Nostromo, she and the cat Jones are the sole survivors of the expedition. After putting herself and the cat in cryosleep, she is rescued fifty-seven years later and relieved of duty by Weyland-Yutani for the destruction of the Nostromo and her outlandish claims about the Alien. After communication is lost with LV-426, Ripley is sent with a unit of colonial marines on the Sulaco to investigate; the entire expedition, except Ripley, Corporal Hicks, the orphan Newt and the android Bishop, is lost. In cryosleep on the Sulaco, Ripley is impregnated with a queen by a facehugger Alien morph; this triggers a fire, which causes the ship to crash on the prison planet Fiorina 161, killing all aboard, save for Ripley. As the sole human survivor of the crash, Ripley helps the prisoners incarcerated on the planet to defeat an Alien created from an animal impregnated by a second facehugger. Weyland-Yutani arrives to claim the queen incubating in Ripley, prompting her to sacrifice herself by diving into the furnace.

Like the rest of the original ensemble, Ripley was written as a male character in the first draft of the screenplay. Writer Dan O'Bannon noted that the genders of the characters were interchangeable, providing more casting options. When Ridley Scott was brought on to direct Alien, he requested that the character be female, in juxtaposition with the Alien and to make her survival surprising. Broadway actress Sigourney Weaver was considered for the role of Lambert when Scott encouraged her to play Ripley. With the 1986 release of Aliens, Ripley became one of the most critically praised and influential female characters in film. John Scalzi, president of the Science Fiction and Fantasy Writers of America, wrote in a 2011 AMC Networks column that he considered the dynamic and relatable Ripley the best science-fiction character of all time. In 2008, the American Film Institute recognized Ripley in "AFI's 100 Years...100 Heroes & Villains" as the second-greatest female protagonist (behind Clarice Starling) and the eighth-greatest protagonist overall.

=== Arthur Dallas ===
Arthur Koblenz Dallas (Tom Skerritt) is the captain of the Nostromo and the only human crew member with access to Mother, the onboard computer. When he receives a distress signal from the Derelict, an Engineer ship, Dallas steers the Nostromo off course to investigate the beacon. After the Alien hatches from Kane's chest and kills Brett, Dallas enters the ship's labyrinthine air duct network to lure it to the airlock and eject it into space. He is attacked by the Alien and disappears – presumed dead – leaving only his flamethrower.

In a deleted scene, Ellen Ripley detours while escaping from the Nostromo and finds Dallas alive in the Alien nest in the process of mutating into an alien egg; she kills Dallas and destroys the nest with a flamethrower at his request as an act of mercy. According to Skerritt, the scene was cut because its quality was below par and it disrupted the pace of Ripley's escape; it was included in the 2003 director's cut.

When Skerritt first read the screenplay for Alien, he declined the project, unimpressed with its writing quality and budget. After the screenplay was edited and the budget enlarged, Skerritt was approached again and signed on. Halfway through production, he approached writer and executive producer Ronald Shusett and asked if he could trade his salary for a one-half percentage point (.5 percent) share in the film. The role had also been offered to Harrison Ford.

=== Joan Lambert ===
Joan Marie Lambert (Veronica Cartwright) is the navigator of the Nostromo and the only other woman on the ship besides Ripley. Disinclined to take risks beyond her console, she resents being chosen as part of the team to explore the Derelict. After Kane's infestation by the facehugger, she berates Ripley for refusing to allow her and the rest of the team aboard. When the Alien begins to kill her crew, Lambert insists that they evacuate the Nostromo. While preparing to leave on a shuttle, Lambert and Parker are confronted by the Alien which kills them. During Ripley's ICC tribunal, fifty-seven years after the first incident, a screen details the deceased members of the Nostromo crew, including Lambert, who is identified as a trans woman.

In the original draft of Alien, Lambert provided comic relief; this attracted Sigourney Weaver, before the screenplay was edited to make her stern and humorless. Veronica Cartwright then expressed an interest in playing Ripley, auditioning for the role and meeting with director Ridley Scott. She was informed that she had "the part", which she and her agent interpreted as the Ripley role; instead, it was Lambert. Cartwright was initially resistant, since she disliked Lambert's serious demeanor, but accepted after talking with the film's producers about Lambert's being a point-of-view character for the audience. She won the 1980 Saturn Award for Best Supporting Actress.

=== Samuel Brett ===
Samuel Elias Brett (Harry Dean Stanton) is an engineering technician on the Nostromo and a good friend of his engineering chief, Parker. He persistently angles for the increased-pay and bonus awards he feels are due him. While the crew searches for the Alien, Brett tries to retrieve the cat Jones; he encounters the mature Alien, which kills him and drags him into an air duct.

When Harry Dean Stanton auditioned for Brett, he told Ridley Scott he was not a fan of science-fiction or horror films; Scott replied that he was not either, but expected Alien to do well. According to Stanton, he was pleased with the film and said it and Pretty in Pink are the films for which he is best recognized. Several of Brett's scenes were deleted from the original cut, including Ripley and Parker seeing his death and his cocooned corpse in the Alien's lair; they were included in the 2003 director's cut. According to writer Dan O'Bannon, the latter scene hinted that Brett's body was becoming an Alien incubator.

=== Gilbert Kane ===
Gilbert Kane (John Hurt), with a facehugger attached in Alien (1979), was the first character attacked by the species onscreen.

Gilbert Ward "Thomas" Kane (John Hurt) is the Nostromo's executive officer. During the Derelict investigation, he moves closer to an egg to get a better look; a facehugger attaches to him and, unbeknownst to him and the crew, impregnates him with an Alien embryo. Kane remains unconscious until the facehugger dies and falls off. At dinner afterwards, Kane goes into convulsions; an infant Alien bursts through his chest, killing him. His body was later jettisoned into space as a funeral by the crew.

Director Ridley Scott originally cast Jon Finch as Kane after John Hurt declined due to a scheduling conflict. Partway through filming, Finch had an episode of hyperglycemia (from not taking insulin to counter his Coca-Cola intake on set); Scott again asked Hurt, who accepted and replaced Finch for the remainder of the filming. Kane is most closely associated with the "chestbursting" scene. Before the scene's single take, the actors were given minimal information about its details; according to the screenplay, the "creature emerges". Hurt was connected to a prosthetic body with the exploding Alien prop tucked away with meat and fake blood. When the scene was filmed the cast reacted dramatically, with Veronica Cartwright hit in the mouth with fake blood and falling backwards.

=== Ash ===
Ash (Ian Holm) is the Nostromo's science officer, who administers medical treatment, conducts biological research and investigates alien life forms. Abruptly assigned to replace the Nostromo's previous medical officer for the return journey from Thedus to Earth, Ash is a secret android tasked by the Weyland-Yutani Corporation to ensure that a mysterious signal emanating from LV-426 is investigated. When Kane is infested by an Alien facehugger, Ash violates quarantine protocol by allowing him to be brought aboard. He attempts to kill Ripley after the ship's computer, Mother, discloses that Ash's orders are to ensure the Alien's return to Weyland-Yutani's laboratories, even at the expense of the crew. He is disabled by Parker and Lambert, and his identity as an android is revealed. Ash's severed head is briefly powered back up by the crew, seeking useful information; Ash confirms his directive then assures them that they cannot defeat the Alien. The head is incinerated by a furious Parker immediately afterwards.

Ash, absent from the original screenplay by Dan O'Bannon and Ronald Shusett, was conceived by David Giler and Walter Hill when Brandywine Productions acquired it. Although Giler and Hill believed that Alien required a secondary story element, O'Bannon said in the film's audio commentary that he saw it as unnecessary. Shusett praised Giler and Hill's addition of the Ash story line in the 2003 documentary, The Beast Within: The Making of 'Alien, calling it "one of the best things in the movie". In the special-edition DVD audio commentary, director Ridley Scott interprets some of Ash's inhuman behavior (such as the attempted suffocation of Ellen Ripley with a rolled-up pornographic magazine) as reflecting Freudian sexual frustration from being anatomically incorrect. Critic Roz Kaveney analyzes Ash in From Alien to The Matrix: Reading Science Fiction Film, seeing him as a menacing robot who exists before his creators would impose programming alluded to in Isaac Asimov's Three Laws of Robotics.

=== Dennis Parker ===
Dennis Monroe Parker (Yaphet Kotto) is the Nostromo's chief engineer; Brett is his assistant. On the ship, he incessantly demands bonuses for investigating the Derelict's distress beacon. After Dallas' fateful confrontation with the Alien, Parker investigates and finds the flamethrower left behind. When Ash attacks Ripley, Parker and Lambert save her and decapitate the android. After Ripley extracts the meaning of Ash's directive to allow the crew to die, Parker uses the flamethrower to incinerate his remains. He and Lambert are killed by the Alien when it ambushes Lambert in their attempt to flee aboard the shuttle, with the Alien crushing Parker and finishing him off with a head bite as he attempts to save Lambert from the Alien attack.

Yaphet Kotto was offered the role of Parker along with lucrative offers from two other productions. Although his agent advised him to decline the role in Alien because his salary was not specified, Kotto accepted the role. To enhance the on-screen tension between Parker and Ripley, Ridley Scott instructed Kotto to antagonize Sigourney Weaver on set.

=== Aliens ===
The extraterrestrial species referred to as "Aliens" (often called "Xenomorphs", a term introduced in the sequel for any extraterrestrial) are the primary, titular antagonists of the Alien franchise. Introduced in the first film, Aliens are laid as eggs by a queen. This produces a facehugger, which latches onto and impregnates its prey with an embryo. This in turn produces an Alien with some characteristics of its host which ejects itself from the host's rib cage, killing it in the process. Described as "pure" by the android Ash, the Alien's motivation is to ensure the survival of its species; this commonly entails the elimination of creatures, such as humans, who pose a threat. With rudimentary intelligence, the Aliens are difficult to kill.

When writers Dan O'Bannon and Ronald Shusett brainstormed for the original film, they decided to have an Alien impregnate a male orally as a metaphor for rape. O'Bannon suggested to Scott that his collaborator from the failed Dune adaptation, Swiss surrealist artist H. R. Giger, design the Alien. Scott chose the sketch Necronom IV, from Giger's Necronomicon, as the basis for the Alien because of its sexual ambiguity and phallic overtones. The Deacon, a creature predating the Alien which shares several biological traits, appears in the final scene of Prometheus after it explodes from a dead Engineer's chest. The Engineer was impregnated by a trilobite conceived by Elizabeth Shaw after sexual intercourse with an infected Charlie Holloway. Designer Neal Scanlan explained in the book Prometheus: The Art of the Film that the breed borrows physical traits such as femininity from Shaw. A number of performers have played Aliens in the series: Bolaji Badejo in Alien; Carl Toop in Aliens; Tom Woodruff Jr. in Alien 3, Alien Resurrection and the Alien vs. Predator franchise; Andrew Crawford and Goran D. Kleut in Alien: Covenant.

=== MU / TH / UR ===
MU / TH / UR, nicknamed "MOTHER" or "Mother", is the artificial intelligence mainframe computer existing across several ships. In Alien, MOTHER aboard the Nostromo (MU / TH / UR 6000) awakens the crew prematurely, in order for them to investigate the signal emanating from the derelict ship. Upon Kane being infested by a Facehugger, thereby confirming the existence of a life form that could be weaponized by Weyland-Yutani, MOTHER gives Ash authorization to use whatever means necessary to keep the Alien alive, even at the expense of crew lives. With the self-destruction of the Nostromo, MOTHER's memory of the events are destroyed.

In Predator: Concrete Jungle, Mother's origins are explored: the human Isabella Borgia: after expanding her lifespan using Yautja blood founding Borgia Industries, and building the city of Neonopolis together with her son Hunter out of the ruins of New Way City, formed the biological core of the first MOTHER supercomputer, governing the day-to-day operation of Neonopolis. Her human component is eventually killed in 2030 by the Yautja "Scarface", destroying her body in the center of MOTHER's core, with the Weyland-Yutani Corporation assuming control over the city in place of Borgia Industries, and installing Isabella's granddafuther and Hunter's daughter Lucretia Borgia as the new biological source of MOTHER.

In Alien: Covenant (set between the events of Predator: Concrete Jungle and Alien), MOTHER aboard the Covenant maintains a more passive role, with her predominantly providing analytics upon request. When Tennessee attempts to lower the ship's altitude to a dangerously close proximity to the storm above the Engineer home world, MOTHER rejects the order and has to be overridden by both Tennessee and Upworth. MOTHER detects an Alien aboard the Covenant and provides the surviving crew members with information of the creature's location, as well as responding to their orders for corralling it.

In Alien: Romulus (set between the events of Alien and Aliens), MOTHER appears onboard the connected Weyland-Yutani Corporation vessels Romulus and Remus.

In Alien: Earth, Yutani-loyal cyborg Morrow contacts MOTHER onboard the Weyland-Yutani Corporation vessel Maginot.

In Predator: Badlands, MOTHER is now in charge of the Weyland-Yutani corporation, ordering Tessa to retrieve Thia from the Yautja Dek.

The character MOTHER is most commonly psychoanalyzed as be complementary to the feminist theory. The most commonly referenced pertaining to the subject is the Barbara Creed book, The Monstrous-Feminine: Film, Feminism, Psychoanalysis, which perceives MOTHER as being complementary to the archaic mother theme of the 1979 film. Creed cites the crew members being awoken by a figure dubbed "MOTHER" in a womb-like room, without a father figure, and with the comprehensive directive to provide life support, as being the poignant indicator to support her conclusion. Likewise, in Beyond the Stars: Locales in American popular film by Paul Loukides and Linda K. Fuller, MOTHER is presented as the central focus for the context of a mother ship. As the authors describe, MOTHER maintains an intimate connection with the crew, providing a watchful eye when they are asleep, as well as a small, womb-like computer module for direct communication about sensitive matters. MOTHER is voiced by Helen Horton in Alien, Giselle Loren and Tasia Valenza in Predator: Concrete Jungle, Lorelei King in Alien: Covenant, Annemarie Griggs in Alien: Romulus, Robin August in Alien: Earth, and Alison Wright in Predator: Badlands.

=== Jones ===
Jones, nicknamed "Jonesy", is an American Shorthair who is the rodent-control ship's cat on the Nostromo. After the birth and escape of the Alien, Jones is detected by the crew and risks interfering with the ship's motion sensors (which could mistake the cat's movements for those of the Alien). Brett finds Jones in the cargo room, where the Alien kills Brett as Jones watches. When the remaining crew members prepare to escape the ship, Ripley loads Jones into a pet carrier but must temporarily abandon him as the Alien approaches her. The Alien inspects Jones but leaves him alone, since the cat poses no threat. Ripley retrieves Jones and flees with him on a shuttle. She and the cat are in cryosleep for fifty-seven years, until they are rescued. Jones remains Ripley's pet for the duration of her new employment until she departs on the Sulaco, leaving him behind. Four cats were used in Alien, with each exhibiting specific feline behaviors such as scampering and hissing. According to Ridley Scott's audio commentary on the Alien DVD, to capture Jones' fearful reaction to the Alien a screen was placed between the cat and a German Shepherd; when the screen between the animals was removed, the cat immediately hissed.

=== Engineers ===
Space jockey skeleton in 1979's Alien; due to its fossilization and elephantine appearance, the species was not considered humanoid in its first appearance.

The Engineers, also known as space jockeys, are an ancient race of large humanoids which created humanity from their own DNA during Earth's primordial era. In Alien, the fossilized corpse of an Engineer is discovered in the pilot's seat of the derelict alien spacecraft; its suit and helmet were thought to be bones, and is the first victim of the Aliens identified onscreen. The Engineers play a central role in the first prequel, Prometheus, which reveals their biology and intention to infect the human race with an alien contagion and mutagen. In the film, the last surviving Engineer on LV-223 is awakened and immediately tries to resume his mission of delivering the substance to Earth, but he is subsequently stopped by the survivors of the human expedition. Ironically he is killed by an Alien like creature created by the mutagen's effect on a human. The android David 8 pilots an Engineer ship to the species' home world, where he unleashes the mutagen against the population, which kills all the Engineers and all other non-floral life on the planet.

For the Engineer pilot in Alien, a 26-foot (7.9 m) set piece was built at Bray Studios; Ridley Scott and cinematographer Derek Vanlint's children played the body doubles to exaggerate the size of the corpse. In the audio commentary on the 1999 twentieth-anniversary re-release of Alien, Scott said that he envisioned the pilot in the original film as driving a "battlewagon" with a haul of biological weapons and wanted to explore the species' story in fifth and sixth installments of the series. In a 2012 Fandango Media interview, he described the Engineers as "tall and elegant" and representing "dark angels".

== Introduced in Aliens (1986) ==
=== Dwayne Hicks ===
Corporal Dwayne Hicks (Michael Biehn), Sergeant Apone's second-in-command, takes over when Apone and most of the Colonial Marines are captured by the Aliens and commanding officer Lieutenant Gorman is incapacitated. Hicks looks for options for holding out with the survivors of the Hadley's Hope colony until aid arrives, and he and Ripley bond when he teaches her to use a pulse rifle. He is one of four survivors of the military mission. As the survivors escape, Hicks is injured when a spray of acid blood from an Alien hits his chest and face. He is apparently killed during the crash of the Sulaco in Alien 3, after which a body impaled on a broken support brace is found in his cryochamber. In the video game Aliens: Colonial Marines, Hicks is revealed to be alive and was actually kidnapped by mercenaries working for the Weyland-Yutani Corporation. His body is replaced by an anonymous victim to cover up the kidnapping, and he is rescued by Colonial Marines. This is considered canon by some, such as Randy Pitchford, but is ignored by most as the game was met with overwhelmingly negative reviews from critics and players alike.

James Remar, initially cast as Hicks, left the project ostensibly due to "artistic differences" with director James Cameron. In a Sidebar podcast, however, Remar said that Cameron terminated his contract after the actor was arrested for drug possession. Producer Gale Anne Hurd contacted Michael Biehn, who accepted the role and flew to England for filming. In an early draft of the Alien 3 screenplay, Hicks was the central protagonist and Ripley had a minor role. Since his character was killed off in the screenplay's final draft, however, Biehn was never approached to appear in that film. When he learned that he had a minor role and his likeness would be used, Biehn and his agent threatened 20th Century Fox with a lawsuit unless he received compensation similar to Aliens.

=== Carter J. Burke ===
Carter J. Burke (Paul Reiser) is special projects director of Weyland-Yutani Corporation's Special Services Division and an antagonist in Aliens. After telling Ellen Ripley about her daughter's death and hearing her account of the Nostromo incident, Burke uses the information to have LV-426's colonists rendezvous with the Derelict and trigger an Alien outbreak. He persuades her to join the Colonial Marine expedition, to destroy (not extract) specimens, as an adviser in exchange for her regaining her flight license. Burke accompanies the squad aboard Sulaco to safeguard the company's investment in the terraforming colony. His ulterior motives are discovered by Ripley; his rationale is that the Aliens are an important species they cannot exterminate and the facility is a significant investment. Burke tries to have Ripley and Newt impregnated by imprisoned facehuggers, but the Colonial Marines intervene. Although most of the survivors press for Burke's execution, Ripley protests; the Aliens cut the power and use an architectural-design flaw to break into the room. He escapes, leaving the rest of the group to die, but is confronted and cornered by an Alien in the locked medical lab and his screams are heard by those outside.

According to Reiser, Cameron cast him as a villain against type, but failed to surprise the audience owing to the character's demeanor and dialogue (appearing to be "a weasel") in his first scenes. In Alien Woman: The Making of Lt. Ellen Ripley, a 2004 literary analysis of the Alien franchise, Jason Smith and Ximena Gallardo-C. describe Burke as a "monster" who is the by-product of organizational culture and willing to have Ripley and Newt impregnated for capital gain because of their "'natural' wombs". In a deleted scene during Ripley's incursion into the Alien hive, shown in the 2010 Blu-ray edition of the Alien Anthology, she discovers a cocooned Burke who reveals that he has been impregnated; he begs Ripley to kill him, but instead she hands him a grenade for him to detonate. Burke will return in the 2024 Marvel Comics series Aliens: What If...?, in the storyline "What If... Carter Burke had lived?" written by Paul Reiser, his son Leon Reiser, as well as Adam F. Goldberg, Brian Volk-Weiss, and Hans Rodionoff, and illustrated by Guiu Vilanova, exploring an alternate continuity in which Burke survived the events of Aliens.

=== Bishop ===
Bishop (Lance Henriksen), the android executive officer assigned to the Sulaco, is primarily responsible for planetary maneuvering. When he introduces himself to Ripley, he says that his programming demands complete loyalty and an inability to harm humans (unlike Ash); Ripley is initially distrustful. After most of the Colonial Marines are wiped out by the Aliens on LV-426, Bishop is a medic and technician who ensures that the company's dropship receives Ripley, Newt and Hicks. When he boards the Sulaco, he is impaled and bisected by the stowaway Alien Queen. When Ripley defeats the Queen by opening the airlock, Bishop saves Newt. He is placed into cryosleep with Ripley, Newt and Hicks. When the Sulaco crashes into Fury 161 in Alien 3, Bishop is damaged beyond repair and thrown into the prison's landfill. Although his speech and memory are repaired by Ripley so that he can disclose the events leading to the crash, he asks Ripley to shut him down permanently, to which Ripley reluctantly obliges. In Aliens: Bishop, Bishop is once again revived by his creator, Michael Bishop Weyland.

Henriksen was one of the several actors, including Michael Biehn and Bill Paxton, cast in Aliens who had collaborated with James Cameron on The Terminator. Roz Kaveney, in her analysis of Ash in From Alien to The Matrix: Reading Science Fiction Film, draws parallels to Bishop as a representation of the Three Laws of Robotics. Although Ash's programming allows (and encourages) harming humans, Bishop puts human life above all else in accordance with the First Law of Robotics. Bishop was studied by LeiLani Nishime of the University of Texas Press in 2005 as a theoretical dramatization of how humans would deal with the presence of an Other, concerning Ripley's initial apprehension about being near a synthetic after her life-threatening encounter with Ash. According to an article by Anton Karl Kozlovic of the University of Nebraska Omaha, Bishop's altruistic actions (which include rescuing Newt and Ripley) contradict a trend towards technophobia in pre-1990 films.

=== Newt Jorden ===
Rebecca Jorden (Carrie Henn), nicknamed "Newt", is the only surviving colonist of LV-426. She is living in the air ducts of the Hadley's Hope compound when she is discovered by the Colonial Marines' party. Although she is in a state of shock, Newt bonds with the party—particularly with Ripley, whom she sees as a mother figure. During the survivors' escape from LV-426, Newt is abducted by the Aliens, but Ripley infiltrates the hive and rescues her from the Alien Queen. Soon afterwards, the Alien Queen confronts the survivors on the Sulaco; Newt is her primary target, but Ripley intervenes and defeats her. Newt is then put into cryosleep, only to drown in the crash of the Sulaco in Alien 3 when her chamber floods. Out of fear of an Alien infestation, her body is autopsied but drowning is the only finding.

According to Aliens's casting director, Newt was the most challenging role to cast; five hundred schoolchildren auditioned, often smiling when they read their lines. Carrie Henn was discovered by a casting agent when she was living with her father, who was stationed at RAF Lakenheath near Lakenheath in Suffolk. The agent notified the producers, and Henn was cast after her audition at Pinewood Studios. Although Henn received a Saturn Award for Best Performance by a Younger Actor, she did not pursue an acting career and became a teacher in Atwater, California. The creative decision for Newt to die in Alien 3 was opposed by James Cameron, who referred to it as a "Temple of Doom slap in the face".

Henn's real-life brother Christopher was also cast in the film, as Newt's brother Timothy.

=== William Hudson ===
Private William Hudson (Bill Paxton) is the Colonial Marines' comtech expert. Arrogant and overconfident, he soon cracks under the stress of the failed incursion into the Alien hive. Hudson despairs and panics until Ripley and Newt reassure him, enabling him to regain his composure. He fights to the end in the colony's operation room, where the survivors of the party make their final stand, and is pulled through a floor grate by an Alien while providing cover fire. In Aliens: Colonial Marines, Hudson's corpse was discovered in the sewers with a large hole in his chest, revealing that Hudson was impregnated by a Facehugger after he was dragged beneath the grates and later died when a chestburster erupted from his chest.

Paxton was visiting his girlfriend Louise Newbury in the United Kingdom in early July 1985 when he auditioned at Pinewood Studios for director James Cameron, whom he knew from previous projects. Although he was enthusiastic about the role, he found the high-energy Hudson one of his most difficult characters. The character is known for saying, "Game over, man!", for which the 2018 Action-Comedy film Game Over, Man! is named after. According to Paxton, he ad-libbed the phrase. He received the Best Supporting Actor award at the 14th Saturn Awards.

=== Scott Gorman ===
Scott Gorman (William Hope) is commanding officer of the mission to LV-426, and the Colonial Marines do not take kindly to the inexperienced lieutenant. Although he performs adequately when they initially secure the empty colony, he quickly loses control of the situation when the Aliens ambush his troops. Ripley takes over, driving the command vehicle, and Gorman is knocked unconscious. When he comes to, he transfers command of the colony's defense to Hicks. During the Aliens' assault on the operations room, Gorman tries to rescue Vasquez but his pistol runs out of ammunition. Realizing that they are trapped, they embrace and detonate a grenade (taking a number of Aliens with them).

Hope had been offered a leading role in Stanley Kubrick's war film, Full Metal Jacket, when he was offered the role of Gorman. He interacted with the other film's cast and crew, since both were shot near the Battersea Power Station in Nine Elms. The cast who played Colonial Marines (except latecomer Michael Biehn) underwent several weeks of training with United States Marines without Hope. Director James Cameron said that he wanted Hope separated so he would be seen as an outsider, complementing Gorman's onscreen inexperience.

=== Vasquez ===
Privates Vasquez (Jenette Goldstein) and Drake are smartgunners on the Sulaco. One of the few survivors of the assault on the hive, she helps seal off the complex from the Aliens. Vasquez is immobilized when acid blood from an Alien, shot at point-blank range, lands on her leg. When Gorman returns to help her, they are surrounded; she delivers a fond parting quip, and they detonate a grenade. Her origin story and legacy is explored in the novel Aliens: Vasquez, which reveals Vasquez to have had twin children at home: Leticia and Ramón Vasquez.

Producer Gale Anne Hurd, impressed with Goldstein's physique, called her when she was an unemployed bodybuilder in the United Kingdom. After she was cast, Goldstein trained for the role with Marine Al Matthews. Her casting as a Latina later became controversial, since Goldstein, a fair-skinned Sephardic Jewish-American actress, required complexion-darkening makeup and dark contact lenses. According to the actress, her character is "universal" in her ambiguity and androgyny. Jack Halberstam discusses Vasquez in his book, Female Masculinity, calling her an ideal example of female masculinity in film because of her frequent displays of bravado and her violent death. Lara Cory of Little White Lies described Vasquez as "butch, muscular, aggressive and fearless". Goldstein won the Saturn Award for Best Supporting Actress at the 14th Saturn Awards.

=== Apone ===
Gunnery Sergeant Apone (Al Matthews) is the squad leader of the Colonial Marines sent to investigate LV-426. During the first incursion into the atmospheric processor, he enforces Gorman's orders not to use pulse rifle and smartgun ammunition. Shortly after finding a surviving, cocooned colonist whose chest bursts to reveal an Alien, Apone grabs a flamethrower from Frost to incinerate it. In the subsequent Alien attack, he is captured alive. Hudson later states that the life sign computer readouts indicate that Apone was not killed in the attack; presumably impregnated by an Alien, he died when the atmosphere processor exploded or from an Alien gestating in his body.

Matthews said in a 2006 Alien Experience interview that he had moved to the United Kingdom due to the treatment of his fellow Vietnam War veterans and was acting in The American Way when Cameron offered him the role of Apone. Using his military experience, Matthews consulted with the film crew and helped direct the actors playing Colonial Marines. According to fellow Aliens actor Daniel Kash, Matthews improvised much of his performance and based it on his Vietnam War experience. His performance influenced the military science fiction subgenre, with the charismatic black commander inspiring the character of Sergeant Avery Johnson in the Halo video-game franchise.

=== Drake ===
Private Drake (Mark Rolston) is a sarcastic, gruff Colonial Marine who serves as a smartgunner alongside Private Vasquez. It is implied that he and Vasquez may be in a relationship, though this is left ambiguous. Drake and Vasquez disobey Gorman's orders in the Atmosphere Processing Plant and keep their ammunition; when the Aliens assault, their firing damages the plant. Drake is killed during the retreat when Vasquez shoots a nearby Alien, spraying him with its acid blood.

=== Frost ===
Private Frost (Ricco Ross) is a wisecracking Colonial Marine, who has a close friendship with Hicks. Frost is chosen to carry the ammunition in the Atmosphere Processor; when the Aliens attack, Dietrich, having been grabbed by an Alien, inadvertently sets Frost ablaze with her flamethrower. Frost tumbles off a catwalk to his death, while the ammunition explodes.

=== Ferro ===
Corporal Ferro (Colette Hiller) is a marine who serves as the dropship pilot. While flying to rescue the survivors of an ambush by the Aliens, an Alien that stowed away on the dropship attacks and kills her, causing the dropship to crash.

=== Private Spunkmeyer ===
Private Spunkmeyer (Daniel Kash) is a marine who serves as the dropship's co-pilot. While flying to rescue the survivors of an ambush by the Aliens, an Alien that stowed away on the dropship attacks and kills both Spunkmeyer and Ferro, causing the dropship to crash. According to the novelization, Spunkmeyer was underage when he enlisted into the Colonial Marines.

=== Amanda Ripley ===
Amanda Ripley-McClaren, nicknamed "Amy" by her mother, is Ellen Ripley's daughter. Posthumously introduced in Aliens, she died at age sixty-six, two years before the events of the film. Amanda is the protagonist in the 2014 video game Alien: Isolation, which takes place fifteen years after the events of Alien and forty-two years before those of Aliens. After learning that the Nostromo's flight recorder has been found, she joins a crew en route to the Sevastopol space station and encounters Aliens that have run amok. Ripley escapes from the station, which is destroyed when it falls into the gravitational well of the Jovian planet KG348.

Amanda Ripley's mention in Aliens was not included in the theatrical version of the film, since 20th Century Fox was concerned about the film's running time. Sigourney Weaver criticized the cut, seeing Amanda as crucial to Ellen Ripley's character development and her bond with the orphaned Newt. While developing Alien: Isolation, Creative Assembly originally desired a female protagonist and decided to use Amanda as the best way to focus on her mother, Ellen's, traits. The picture model for Ripley in Aliens is Elizabeth Inglis, Sigourney Weaver's mother, and in Alien: Isolation she is voiced by Andrea Deck with motion capture by Kezia Burrows. Deck also reprised her role in Alien: Blackout and Isolation: The Digital Series. Amanda's design in Alien: Isolation was based on pictures from Elizabeth Inglis' youth.

== Introduced in Alien 3 (1992) ==
=== Leonard Dillon ===
Leonard Dillon (Charles S. Dutton) is the Fury 161 preacher and chaplain to the prisoners. An inmate with a history of murder and rape, he turned to God while incarcerated. Dillon is one of the few prisoners to whom Ripley speaks after her arrival; he asks if she has faith, and says that his men have faith enough to accept anyone. He delivers an eloquent eulogy during Newt and Hicks' funeral which touches Ripley. When prisoners try to rape her, Dillon bashes them with a crowbar. Ripley asks Dillon to kill her and the gestating Alien inside her, and he promises to do so when the Alien is dead. Shortly afterwards, Dillon organizes the remaining prisoners to lure the Alien into the foundry and drown it in molten lead. When the Alien attempts to follow Ripley out of the trap, Dillon baits it; when it attacks, Ripley submerges them both in the molten lead.

According to Dutton, Sigourney Weaver was largely responsible for his casting. In the years leading up the production of Alien 3, she promised him a role in the third film. While he was working on Broadway in December 1990, Weaver phoned him that the studio approved his casting and wanted him to fly to London. Although Dutton liked Alien 3, he found its production tumultuous; director David Fincher encountered resistance from 20th Century Fox, and Pinewood Studios was in need of renovation.

=== Jonathan Clemens ===
Jonathan Clemens (Charles Dance) is Fury 161's doctor. When Ripley crashes into the oil sea, he nurses her back to health and shows her around. Clemens performs an autopsy on Newt at Ripley's request, although he is annoyed at not being told why. To gain Ripley's trust, Clemens admits that he got drunk after a long shift as a resident and accidentally killed eleven men being treated after a boiler explosion by misprescribing a painkiller, and that he was secretly addicted to morphine. Sentenced to Fiorina 161, he served his time but remained behind with the other inmates when they refused to leave. Ripley still does not reveal the true nature of the events taking place; as Clemens injects her with a serum, the Alien kills him and drags his body away.

According to Dance, Clemens was requested by 20th Century Fox as a love interest for Ellen Ripley. Director David Fincher initially intended to reunite Paul McGann, Richard E. Grant and Ralph Brown (from Withnail and I) with Grant playing Clemens, but Grant declined the role. Despite Alien 3's poor critical reception, Dance said in a 2014 Daily Beast interview that he considered the film superior to Aliens and its potential was hampered by 20th Century Fox. According to the actor, his role as Clemens exposed him to American audiences and led to a prominent role as Tywin Lannister in Game of Thrones.

=== Harold Andrews ===
Harold Andrews (Brian Glover) is the warden of Fury 161. He becomes increasingly annoyed with Ripley when she leaves the infirmary and takes out his frustration on Clemens, who he distrusts. When Murphy is killed in the ventilation fan, Andrews blames Ripley, suggesting that Murphy was concentrating on her rather than his work. When Golic returns from the scene of Boggs and Rains' death covered in blood, Andrews thinks that the "simple bastard" has murdered them. He does not believe Ripley's story about the Alien and quarantines her to the infirmary, knowing that Weyland-Yutani considers her a high priority. Andrews is organizing a search party for Boggs and Rains in the mess hall when Ripley runs in, screaming, after Clemens is killed in the infirmary. He orders Aaron to escort her back to the infirmary before the Alien snatches and kills him from the air ducts.

In From Alien to The Matrix: Reading Science Fiction Film, Roz Kaveney writes that Harold Andrews bullies Ellen Ripley, who is demoralized after the events of the first two Alien films. According to Kaveney, Andrews' method of directing the prison from monitors is ironic because David Fincher directed the film the same way (which Sigourney Weaver disliked). In David Fincher: Films That Scar, a literary analysis of the director, Mark Browning writes that Harold Andrews' totalitarian control of Fury 161 exempts Dillon's religiosity because Andrews views religion as a tool to prevent violence and provide control. Film critic Malcolm Johnson wrote in a Hartford Courant review that Andrews was a petty but potent dictator, similar to Benito Mussolini.

=== Francis Aaron ===
Francis Aaron (Ralph Brown), nicknamed "Eighty-Five" for his IQ, is Andrews' assistant and a prison guard. After Andrews' death, Aaron tries to take charge but the prisoners refute his authority. Ripley tells him several times that the Weyland-Yutani company does not care about him or any other employee, and are more interested in acquiring the Aliens. Aaron refuses to send the rescue ship away because he wants to see his family again. He helps Ripley with the bio-scan she performs on herself on the crashed spacecraft, and they discover that she has been impregnated with an Alien chestburster. Weyland-Yutani immediately informs the prison that a rescue ship will arrive in several hours to pick her up, and Aaron concludes that the corporation only wants the Aliens. When the prisoners decide to lure the alien into the molten lead, he calls them crazy and locks himself in his office. Michael Bishop lands with his team and tries to convince Ripley to leave with him; Aaron hits him with a large metal rod, nearly ripping his ear off, and is shot dead by Bishop's team.

David Fincher cast Ralph Brown as Francis Aaron, reuniting the actor with fellow Withnail and I cast member Paul McGann. In Alien Woman: The Making of Lt. Ellen Ripley, Jason Smith and Ximena Gallardo-C. consider Aaron's body language and overall reaction to Ellen Ripley's impregnation (his attention is drawn from the bio-scan to the Alien roaming the facility) as indicative of Ripley's own state of mind. In his "Arrow in the Head" review of Alien 3 on JoBlo.com, John Fallon praised Brown for playing the character in a manner reminiscent of Forrest Gump. Michael Nordine wrote in an LA Weekly article that although Aaron is a secondary character, his loyalty to Ripley and betrayal of Weyland-Yutani contradict his apparent company-orientation and lack of intelligence.

=== Walter Golic ===
Walter Golic (Paul McGann) is a mentally-unstable murderer and arsonist who is imprisoned on Fury 161. He sees the Alien killing Boggs and Rains and is later found in the cafeteria eating cereal, his face covered in blood. Golic is presumed to have turned on his fellow inmates, and he is strapped to a bed in the infirmary under the supervision of Clemens and Ripley. When the Alien kills Clemens, he watches the creature admiringly.

McGann was cast as Walter Golic to appear with Ralph Brown, his co-star in Withnail and I. Alien 3 Assembly Cut expands on Golic's part in Alien 3, with Golic persuading Morse to unstrap him in the infirmary when he hears that the Alien has been trapped. He knocks Morse out, goes to the containment chamber containing the Alien, kills Arthur (who is guarding the door) and releases the creature—which promptly kills him. According to the novelization, Golic believed the Alien was communicating with him telepathically and that they were kindred spirits. In an August 1992 Elle magazine article, McGann said that Golic intends to release the Alien in the hope that he can collaborate with it to kill the humans on Fury 161. Alien 3 editor Terry Rawlings said in the 2003 special-edition DVD release of the Alien Anthology that a parallel exists between Golic and Renfield in Dracula; both are deranged lunatics, who fall under the influence of a paranormal entity which they try to appease.

=== Alan Jude ===
Alan Jude (Vincenzo Nicoli) was an inmate at the Fiorina "Fury" 161 Class C Work Correctional Unit, one of several who stayed behind after the facility was officially closed down by Weyland-Yutani. He was involved in battling a lone Xenomorph that was born in the prison in 2179.

Jude was killed acting as bait during a desperate attempt to lure the Xenomorph into the lead mold at the foundry alongside the prison.

=== Robert Morse ===
Robert Morse (Danny Webb) is loud, argumentative, cynical and Golic's only friend. Golic, who has been restrained in the infirmary since the deaths of Boggs and Rains, convinces Morse to free him; he subdues Morse, and releases the creature. After Dillon's death, Morse helps Ripley reach the top of the furnace so she can kill the Alien Queen and then herself by deliberately falling into the vat of molten lead. At the end of the film he is led away by Weyland-Yutani personnel, the only surviving resident of Fury 161. He committed the events of Fury 161 into writing; in the novelization for Alien Resurrection, Call says that she had read all of the 'banned histories', "including 'Morse'".

=== Michael Bishop Weyland ===
Michael Bishop Weyland (Lance Henriksen), also known as Bishop II, is a scientist employed by Weyland-Yutani. Ripley meets him at the furnace, where he tells her that he designed the Bishop android series; his medical team will extract the Alien Queen inside her and destroy it. Ripley does not believe him, and backs away towards the furnace as he begs her to give him the creature. Aaron sneaks up behind him and strikes him with a crowbar, nearly ripping off his ear. He watches in despair as Ripley sacrifices herself by falling into the lead smelter. He appears in Alien 3 and Aliens: Bishop.

Michael Weyland's ambiguous humanity is a subject of debate for viewers and critics, and speculation exists that he is an android more sophisticated than Bishop. In Cinema of Simulation: Hyperreal Hollywood in the Long 1990s, Randy Laist interprets this ambiguity as indicative of a theme of the Alien franchise: what matters is a character's actions, not its species. Michael Weyland is a duplicitous character, and it is irrelevant whether he is a human or an android.

=== Gregor ===
Gregor (Peter Guinness) is one of the prisoners who attempts to rape Ripley, something that leads to a beating at the hands of Dillon. Gregor is later severely burned during the quinitricetyline explosion, and is left covered in bandages for the remainder of the film. During the bait-and-chase sequence, Gregor and Morse literally run into each other. Having mistaken each other for the Alien, the convicts laugh at the situation, before the actual Alien strikes and rips Gregor's throat open.

=== Ted "Junior" Gillas ===
Ted "Junior" Gillas (Holt McCallany) is a prisoner recognizable by his tear drop tattoo. Junior leads the attempted gang rape of Ripley, something that leads to a beating at Dillon's hands. Junior is killed during the quinitricetyline explosion, which claims the lives of several other prisoners.

In the Assembly Cut, Junior survives the explosion and sacrifices himself by using himself as bait to lure the Alien into the nuclear waste tank.

=== Thomas Murphy ===
Thomas Murphy (Christopher Fairbank) is an inmate. While cleaning the vents, Murphy stumbles upon the Alien's shedded skin; the Alien blinds him with acid, and Murphy stumbles into a ventilation fan which tears him apart.

== Introduced in Alien Resurrection (1997) ==
=== Ripley 8 ===
Ripley 8 embraces the Newborn which identifies her as its mother in Alien Resurrection (1997).

Ripley 8 (Sigourney Weaver), also known as Number 8, is a human-Alien hybrid cloned from the DNA of Ellen Ripley and the embryonic Alien Queen recovered from Ripley's blood samples taken from Fury 161. The DNA's integrity has been compromised by the process of infestation and the human and Alien DNA in Number 8 is mixed, creating a humanoid organism with Alien traits such as an empathic link with the rest of the hive, acidic blood, enhanced strength and reflexes and genetic memories. After United Systems Military researchers extract the Alien Queen from Number 8 on the ship USM Auriga in the year 2381, they keep her alive and confined and give her a rudimentary education. When the Aliens breach their containment, Number 8 joins the crew of the mercenary vessel Betty to attempt an escape; she is captured by the Aliens, who bring her to their nest. Number 8's Alien Queen gives birth to a Newborn, a hybrid which identifies Number 8 as its mother after it kills the Alien Queen. Number 8 escapes from the Auriga on the Betty and again encounters the Newborn, which she jettisons into space. After the Betty lands on Earth, Number 8 looks around with the other survivors and wonders about their uncertain future.

20th Century Fox initially conceived Alien Resurrection as centered around a teenage clone of Newt, inspired by Buffy Summers in Buffy the Vampire Slayer. However, the studio reconsidered abandoning the emphasis on heroine Ellen Ripley and told screenwriter Joss Whedon to make the story about a clone of Ripley instead. Although Sigourney Weaver favored Ripley's death at the end of Alien 3 in the hope that it would deter rumored Alien vs. Predator films, she supported Whedon's concept of a human-Alien hybrid because of the character's uncertain loyalty to either half of her genealogy.

=== Annalee Call ===
Annalee Call (Winona Ryder) is the newest crew member of the Betty, an undercover, 'Auton' synthetic (an android manufactured by other androids to appear more human) on a secret mission to kill Ripley 8 and her unborn Alien Queen. After arriving on the Auriga, Call infiltrates Number 8's cell to kill her and discovers that the Queen has been extracted. She is apprehended by Wren, who rounds up the crew of the Betty for execution, but they overpower the USM soldiers and try to escape with Wren in custody. Wren shoots Call, who falls to her apparent death, but she reappears and reveals her synthetic origin. Call orders the Auriga to crash into Earth. On the Betty, Call is confronted by the Newborn; she is saved by Number 8, who ejects it into space.

Annalee Call was originally written for Angelina Jolie; although Jolie auditioned, she turned down the role and Winona Ryder was cast in December 1996. Call had a generally negative critical reception, largely due to a perceived lack of synergy with the film and the franchise. Roger Ebert praised Ryder's acting, but felt that she did not bring a strong presence or purpose to the film except as a familiar face to younger viewers. Nordling agreed in a 2012 Ain't It Cool News analysis, saying that Call's synthetic origin is unnecessary and her only role is that of a surrogate audience.

=== Dom Vriess ===
Paraplegic Dom Vriess (Dominique Pinon) is the Betty's chief engineer. He often whistles the Popeye theme. When the Aliens escape their confinement, Vriess holds his own with a collapsible shotgun while separated from the group. After he rejoins the group, Christie carries him on his back and he helps defend the group from the Aliens until Christie sacrifices himself. The group escapes aboard the Betty, in which Vriess and Johner are co-pilots.

Pinon and Ron Perlman were cast by Alien Resurrection director Jean-Pierre Jeunet largely due to the director's practice of casting recurring collaborators in unconventional, marginal roles. In Deleuze and Film: A Feminist Introduction, Teresa Rizzo explores Alien Resurrection's hybridization theme; the dynamic between Vriess and his wheelchair share a synergy of flesh and prosthetic with Number 8 and her Alien composition.

=== Johner ===
Johner (Ron Perlman) is a crew member and mercenary on the Betty. After the crew boards the Auriga they encounter Number 8, whom Johner tries to seduce. She overpowers him, attacking the rest of the crew as well. The Aliens escape captivity, forcing Johner and the rest of the crew to collaborate with Number 8 to escape from the Auriga. When he asks Number 8 how Ellen Ripley defeated the Aliens, she replies that Ripley died. Aboard the Betty, Johner and Vriess co-pilot their damaged ship to Earth.

Perlman, a frequent collaborator with director Jean-Pierre Jeunet, said in a 2009 AMC Networks featurette that Alien Resurrection was his only film in which he feared for his life. During the filming of the underwater scene, Perlman struggled with the aquatic set and nearly drowned because he could not reach its openings. In a character-breaking occurrence, Perlman nearly compromised a shot of Sigourney Weaver making a basket from behind but editor Hervé Schneid was able to remove Perlman's reaction from the scene. In From Alien to The Matrix: Reading Science Fiction Film, Roz Kaveney interprets Johner and Number 8 as monogamous animals, with a weaker, aggressive male unsuccessfully attempting to seduce a stronger female.

=== Christie ===
Christie (Gary Dourdan), an adept mercenary, is second-in-command of the Betty. After Call is apprehended and the crew rounded up for execution, Christie uses his hidden pair of pistols to shoot them out of their situation. When the crew goes underwater, Christie harnesses Vriess to his back and swims to the opening (which puts them in the middle of a clutch of Alien eggs). Fleeing from the attacking Aliens, Christie is injured and his foot is snagged by an Alien. He saves Vriess by detaching himself, allowing Christie to fall into the water below, sacrificing himself.

Christie's sacrifice in the film is a heavily criticized plot element, with critics from online publications such as Cracked.com and Bloody Disgusting calling it avoidable and unnecessary. In Keyframes: Popular Cinema and Cultural Studies, Matthew Tinkcom and Amy Villarejo write that Christie reinforces an Alien-franchise trope (shared by Parker in Alien and Dillon in Alien 3) where black characters save and sacrifice themselves for Caucasian characters. The theme of hybridization is exemplified by Christie and Vriess, according to Rizzo in Deleuze and Film: A Feminist Introduction; while the two characters are harnessed together, they alternate movement, support and combat.

=== Frank Elgyn ===
Frank Elgyn (Michael Wincott), the Betty's captain, is Sabra Hillard's lover. Elgyn has an illegal partnership with General Martin Perez in which he delivers materials off the books to expedite the Auriga's research and other activities. Elgyn delivers a shipment of humans in cryostasis, which are used as incubators for the Aliens. Elgyn and Perez maintain an understanding that there will be no disruptive activity aboard the station. This agreement is later compromised by Call by her contact with Ripley 8. Shortly after the Aliens escape captivity, Elgyn is killed when one of them pulls him through floor grates and impales him.

Although Roz Kaveney generally criticizes Alien Resurrection in From Alien to The Matrix: Reading Science Fiction Film, she praises the film for depicting Elgyn as a rough character who has tender moments with Hillard; his leadership causes his death early in the film. In his JoBlo.com "Arrow in the Head" review, John Fallon calls Wincott's charisma one of the film's few redeeming qualities (despite the poorly written character).

=== Sabra Hillard ===
Sabra Hillard (Kim Flowers) is the Betty's assistant pilot and Elgyn's romantic partner. After his death, the situation overwhelms her and she breaks down. When the survivors must swim, Hillard's hesitation inadvertently puts her within reach of the Aliens; they catch her, and swim off with her flailing body.

=== Martin Perez ===
General Martin Perez (Dan Hedaya) is the commanding officer of the USM Auriga, overseeing the ship's legal (and illicit) activities. After Ripley 8 is cloned and her Queen embryo is extracted, Perez is uneasy with her enhanced physical and psychological abilities but allows her to live; Dr. Wren and Dr. Gediman continue their research on her. Perez hires Elgyn to abduct a number of humans in cryostasis as incubators for the cloned Aliens; he gives the Betty's crew food and lodging, emphasizing that they cannot interfere with the research on the Auriga. When the Aliens board an escape craft, he sabotages them with a grenade. An Alien bites the back of Perez' head, exposing his brain.

In the drafts of the Alien Resurrection screenplay, writer Joss Whedon included a death scene in which a lifeform was sucked through a gap in the hull of a ship. In the second draft, Perez was sucked through a fist-sized breach in the hull of the Auriga; this was changed in the final version to the Newborn being sucked through the window of the Betty. 20th Century Fox executives were skeptical about the final version, seeing it as a comedic scene contrasting with the overall tone of the Alien franchise, but director Jean-Pierre Jeunet persuaded them to leave the scene in.

=== Mason Wren ===
Dr. Mason Wren (J. E. Freeman) is one of five scientists employed by the USM to clone the Alien Queen. After the Queen is extracted from Ripley, Wren conducts social experiments on Number 8 (whom he considers a predator). He discovers Call infiltrating Number 8's cell, and orders the mercenaries rounded up for execution. They overpower the infantry and take Wren hostage, forcing him to lead them to the Betty. During an Alien attack, Wren shoots Call and escapes from his captors. He confronts the crew of the Betty aboard the ship as Larry Purvis' Alien begins to emerge from his chest. Wren shoots Purvis, who overpowers him and pulls Wren's head to Purvis' chest. The chestburster erupts through Purvis' rib cage and Wren's skull, killing them both.

According to Roz Kaveney in From Alien to The Matrix: Reading Science Fiction Film, Wren is the only character to dominate Number 8. Although Johner unsuccessfully attempts to dominate her sexually, Wren dominates her with physical force and a dehumanizing attitude. In a 2013 Total Film interview, writer Joss Whedon expressed discontent with the casting of J. E. Freeman; the character was intended to have a mysterious element in his unscrupulous activities, which was overshadowed by typecasting.

=== Jonathan Gediman ===
Dr. Jonathan Gediman (Brad Dourif) is one of five scientists who clone Ripley, extract the Queen embryo and manage the cloned Aliens. After the embryo is extracted, Gediman begs Wren and Perez to allow Number 8 to live. When the Aliens escape, they abduct him while he investigates their disappearance. Gediman, seen cocooned in the lair when Number 8 is brought to the Queen, is overjoyed to see the Queen give birth to a hybrid Newborn through a human reproductive system. After killing its mother, the Newborn bites into Gediman's skull and kills him.

Joss Whedon wrote Gediman as a corrupt, twisted character whose amoral activities would become clear later in the film. With the casting of Brad Dourif, however, Whedon felt that the mystery element was compromised because Dourif is commonly cast in unsettling roles. In Alien Woman: The Making of Lt. Ellen Ripley, Jason Smith and Ximena Gallardo-C. describe Gediman's dominance of Number 8 as similar to Wren's, Gediman sees her as a female predator, and Wren views her as a beastly object.

=== Vincent DiStephano ===
Vincent DiStephano (Raymond Cruz), a United Systems Military soldier sent to capture the crew of the Betty, is captured by the mercenaries when the rest of the soldiers are killed by the Aliens. He agrees to cooperate with the survivors to escape from the Auriga. When Call's identity as an Auton is revealed, DiStephano summarizes their history as second-generation synthetics created by other synthetics as sleeper agents. After DiStephano and the group board the Betty, the ship's cargo hatch is stuck open; when Call tries to fix it, she is confronted by the stowaway Newborn. DiStephano checks on her and is caught by the Newborn, which crushes his skull out of curiosity, mirroring Ripley 8's earlier curiosity when she broke the arm of one of the scientists who just removed the embryonic queen that was within her.

Vincent DiStephano was not included in the original screenplay for Alien Resurrection, but director Jean-Pierre Jeunet admired Cruz' previous work and had casting director Rick Pagano arrange a meeting. DiStephano was added to the cast as the remaining soldier and guide for the band of survivors. In Alien Zone II: The Spaces of Science-fiction Cinema, Annette Kuhn calls DiStephano's death at the hands of the Newborn a perverse joke because of its juxtaposition of infantile features and curiosity with gruesome killing.

=== Larry Purvis ===
Larry Purvis (Leland Orser) is a test subject who is kidnapped as an incubator for the facehuggers. After he is impregnated and rescued, Call offers to bring him along so he can be frozen and the Alien embryo surgically extracted later. On the Betty, the survivors are ambushed and held at gunpoint by Dr. Wren when Purvis goes into convulsions. He staggers over to Wren, who shoots him. Purvis stays on his feet and overpowers Wren, pulling the scientist's head to his chest. The Alien erupts through Purvis' rib cage and Wren's head, killing them both.

Larry Purvis' character arc, overcoming victimization and heroically sacrificing himself to defeat his captor, was well received by critics. In From Alien to the Matrix: Reading Science Fiction Film, Roz Kaveney calls the arc one of the most satisfying elements of Alien Resurrection; an otherwise-unremarkable, universally disrespected character ensures the survival of the protagonists and gives Wren poetic justice. Randy Laist interprets Purvis' action as "[turning] the givens of his techno-scientific reinvention into a source of resistance against the techno-scientific apparatus" in Cinema of Simulation: Hyperreal Hollywood in the Long 1990s.

== Introduced in Prometheus (2012) ==
=== Elizabeth Shaw ===
Elizabeth Shaw (Noomi Rapace) is an archaeologist and the central protagonist of Prometheus. In 2089, after discovering a series of identical cave paintings depicting a star chart with her lover, Charlie Holloway, in Quiet Eye: Elizabeth Shaw, they convince Weyland Corporation founder Peter Weyland to finance an expedition to a probable origin candidate: the moon LV-223. In Prometheus, after arriving at the moon and awakening in 2093 on the ship, the USCSS Prometheus, Shaw and Holloway introduce their theory that the star charts were created by Engineers: a hypothetical, technologically advanced species which created humanity. Entering the structure covering the Engineer ship, the Juggernaut (near where the Prometheus settled), Shaw discovers many Engineer corpses and a preserved head—proving her and Holloway's theory. After having sex with an infected Holloway, Shaw is impregnated with an extraterrestrial organism which she has surgically removed. She meets Peter Weyland, who had faked his death to remain alive in cryosleep long enough to meet an Engineer so that his youth could be restored. After talking to Janek about the Engineers, Shaw concludes that they intended to destroy humanity and joins Weyland's expedition. She is subdued after she demands that an Engineer tell her why they intended to destroy humanity. After seeing the Engineer decapitate David and kill the expedition's crew, Shaw convinces Janek to sacrifice the Prometheus by flying the ship into the Juggernaut. She returns to the Prometheus' life-support unit, where the Engineer attacks her; he is subdued and impregnated by Shaw's extraterrestrial offspring. David convinces Shaw to return for his head and body so he can pilot another Engineer ship, and she asks him to take them to the Engineer's home world. With a final report to Earth detailing the events, Shaw and David leave the moon. After David, whom Shaw has repaired, unleashes the mutagen against the Engineers and their ship crashes, Shaw sends a transmission of her singing "Take Me Home, Country Roads" by John Denver. David later confesses to Walter that she "did not die in the crash", as he initially claimed to the team from the colony ship Covenant, eleven years after her disappearance. Walter later finds her dissected corpse, which David had used for his experiments to create a perfect version of the Alien, whilst Daniels finds sketches of what David had done to her.

Shaw's religious passion is the central theme and driving force behind the events of Prometheus, with her search for God triggering the expedition's disastrous outcome. During the development of Prometheus, Charlize Theron, Anne Hathaway, Natalie Portman, Gemma Arterton, Carey Mulligan, and Abbie Cornish were considered for the role of Elizabeth Shaw. Noomi Rapace first came to director Ridley Scott's attention in 2009, when he watched the film adaptation of The Girl with the Dragon Tattoo in which Rapace played Lisbeth Salander. Scott and Rapace met in 2010 and by January 2011, she was signed to play Shaw. The Swedish Rapace trained with a dialect coach to develop a British accent fitting the character's backstory. Shaw was generally well received by critics, with many drawing parallels to Ellen Ripley (to which Rapace was apathetic). In a four-out-of-four starred review of Prometheus, Roger Ebert praised Rapace's performance as in the same strong-female-lead vein as Weaver's in Alien. Rapace was nominated for the Choice Movie Breakout Award at the 2012 Teen Choice Awards. Her return in Alien: Covenant was uncertain during the film's development, with Rapace and the filmmakers making contradictory statements about her involvement. She was confirmed as returning in a smaller capacity in June 2016, with the filming of her scenes lasting a week.

=== David 8 ===
David 8 (Michael Fassbender) is Peter Weyland's synthetic assistant and the creator of the Aliens. The eighth in a line of David models representing Weyland's unfulfilled wish for a son, David was created by a middle-age Weyland, named after the eponymous Michelangelo statue. While the Prometheus is en route to LV-223, David studies the Engineers' (presumed) dialects, human culture and the dreams of the crew. After their arrival, David accompanies the expedition to the Juggernaut, where he acquires a vial of a black, extraterrestrial liquid. David contaminates a drink he gives Holloway to impregnate Shaw with an extraterrestrial life form. He explores the Juggernaut and cuts his feed to Vickers, giving Weyland private-screening access as he learns about a last-surviving Engineer in cryosleep. David prepares Weyland for the expedition to awaken the Engineer. He translates Weyland's request for immortality, and the Engineer decapitates him and kills the rest of the expedition except for Shaw. After Janek crashes the Prometheus into the Juggernaut, David's severed head warns Shaw that the Engineer is coming to kill her. He contacts her after she escapes from the life-support unit, telling her that he would like to help her escape LV-223 by piloting another Engineer ship. After Shaw recovers his head and body, he promises to take her to the Engineers' home world and they leave LV-223. David, whom Shaw has repaired, unleashes the mutagen on the Engineers' home world, wiping them out along with all other non-floral life. David conducts experiments with the mutagen to create the perfect organism, using Shaw's body for the experiments. When an expedition from the colony ship Covenant arrives eleven years later, David saves them from Neomorphs. He leads them to his base situated at the Engineer temple, where he becomes acquainted with his successor android, Walter, and lures Oram to get impregnated by a Facehugger, giving birth to the first Xenomorph. David is confronted by Walter about Shaw's fate, prompting David to disable him. David attacks Daniels, but is interrupted by the recuperated Walter. The two androids fight, with David emerging the victor and discreetly assuming Walter's identity. After escaping to the Covenant, David coordinates the defense against the Alien that infiltrated the ship. After Daniels defeats the creature, David helps her and Tennessee into the sleeping pods. With Daniels in the pod, David reveals his true identity and puts her to sleep. David regurgitates two Facehugger embryos that he refrigerates with the human embryos and, impersonating Walter, sends out a transmission proclaiming that Daniels and Tennessee are the only survivors of the expedition.

After the synopsis of Prometheus was revealed in 2011, writer Damon Lindelof had an MTV interview in which he described David's primary function as the robotic, non-human observer. When Prometheus was released, Lindelof said that David's apathy as a synthetic is a central theme of the film; while his human architects search for their creators, he is disillusioned at being confined by them since he considers himself superior. Michael Fassbender, director Ridley Scott's first choice for the role, was cast as David in January 2011. Instead of borrowing elements of the synthetic characters in the previously released Alien films, Fassbender studied the replicant character Rachel in Scott's 1982 science-fiction film Blade Runner and based his voice on the HAL 9000 computer in 2001: A Space Odyssey and his movement on Olympic diver Greg Louganis, David Bowie in The Man Who Fell to Earth, Dirk Bogarde in The Servant and Peter O'Toole in Lawrence of Arabia. Fassbender, receiving unanimous critical acclaim for his portrayal of David, was nominated for Best Supporting Actor by the London Film Critics' Circle and the Saturn Awards.

=== Meredith Vickers ===
Meredith Vickers (Charlize Theron), an upper-level employee of the Weyland Corporation, is Peter Weyland's estranged daughter and joins the Prometheus expedition as a corporate overseer. After the ship settles down in 2093, she explains her lack of faith in the mission to Shaw and Holloway. While monitoring spectagraphs (sensors deployed by Sean Fifield), Vickers is seduced by Janek in her quarters. She collaborates with David, who gives her a feed of his mission to explore the secrets of the Juggernaut, but is denied access since he is directed by Peter Weyland. When Holloway becomes infected Vickers bars him from the ship and, at his insistence, incinerates him with a flamethrower. As Weyland prepares to meet the Engineer, she warns him that "a king has his reign, and then he dies". After seeing her father's death on a live feed, Vickers orders the Prometheus to return to Earth but Shaw convinces Janek to ram the Prometheus into the embarking Engineer ship. Realizing that she cannot escape, Vickers and her life-support unit are jettisoned to LV-223's surface. Shortly after landing she is caught in the path of the rolling Engineer ship, which crushes her.

Michelle Yeoh and Angelina Jolie were two early casting choices for Meredith Vickers. Although Charlize Theron was initially approached to play Elizabeth Shaw, she declined due to scheduling conflicts with Mad Max: Fury Road. When Fury Road was delayed, Theron was cast as Vickers opposite Rapace. After she was cast, Theron collaborated with director Ridley Scott and writer Damon Lindelof to create scenes developing the character's backstory and persona. She interpreted the character as a villain who maintains a secret agenda undermining that of the mission. Vickers was written, costumed and performed as dissociated from humanity. Her physical similarity to David suggests that his design mimicked Weyland's biological child and raises the possibility that she may be an android herself. However, when asked if Vickers is an android, Lindelof clarified that she is indeed human. Theron's performance was well-received, and she was nominated for a Choice Summer Movie Star – Female award by the Teen Choice Awards. Vickers failing to remove herself from the path of the rolling Juggernaut was an unpopular narrative decision, with film pundits like Robert Fure of Film School Rejects criticizing it for going against the judgment of an otherwise intelligent character.

=== Janek ===
Janek (Idris Elba) is captain of the Prometheus. Following Holloway's suggestion, he lands the ship near the structure containing the Juggernaut. During the expedition Janek remains on the Prometheus, observing the schematics which Fifield's spectagraphs develop. He seduces Meredith Vickers while Sean Fifield and Rafe Milburn radio for direction. Vickers and Janek recognize the Juggernaut as an Engineer ship. While Shaw prepares to join Weyland on the expedition to awaken the Engineer, Janek says that the Engineers had nefarious intentions with the biological weapons and he will do whatever is necessary to protect Earth's interests. When Vickers orders Janek to bring the Prometheus home, Shaw tells him that the Engineer ship is headed to Earth to release the black liquid and annihilate the human race. Janek decides to steer the Prometheus into the Engineer ship, and orders everyone to leave. Assistant pilots Chance and Ravel refuse and help Janek run the Prometheus into the Engineer ship, crippling it, sacrificing themselves, and saving the human race.

In February 2011 Elba, known at the time for playing Stringer Bell in The Wire, reportedly joined the cast of Prometheus in an undisclosed role. When the film was released he described Janek's background, and the character's career as a longshoreman and sailor motivate him to maintain the well-being of his crew. Roger Ebert praised Elba's performance, calling Janek's evolution the most interesting in the film.

=== Peter Weyland ===
Peter Weyland (Guy Pearce) is the elderly founder and owner of Weyland Corporation, Meredith Vickers' estranged father and the creator of David, Weyland wants to meet the Engineers so his youth can be restored. Convinced of the veracity of Shaw and Holloway's findings and hypothesis, Weyland finances the voyage of the Prometheus to LV-223. On the ship, he orders David to "try harder" to uncover the Engineers' secrets. Shaw enters Weyland's quarters, where he prepares to meet the last Engineer (who is in cryosleep). On the Engineer ship, he has David talk to the Engineer; Shaw interferes, and Weyland orders her subdued and shot if necessary. When the Engineer learns about Weyland's intentions, he decapitates David and uses his head to beat Weyland to death. Dying, Weyland tells David that the voyage was in vain. A younger Weyland appears in a flashback in Alien: Covenant, engaging in conversation with a newly activated David.

Writer Damon Lindelof conceived Peter Weyland as a man with a massive ego and a god complex. During the film's early development director Ridley Scott intended Max von Sydow to play Weyland, but he began to favor Guy Pearce when a scene was written with a younger version of the character. To depict Weyland's aging, Pearce wore heavy prosthetics requiring five hours to apply and one hour to remove. The actor worked to replicate the speech patterns and movements of an elderly man. Although Weyland's younger version was omitted from Prometheus' final screenplay, the film marketed the character with a fictional, futuristic TED talk in which Pearce appears without prosthetics. His performance was generally negatively received because of the unconvincing prosthetics and the casting of a 44-year-old actor as a 103-year-old man. However, the Weyland Industries web campaign was recognized by the Key Art Awards. In October 2016, it was reported that Pearce would be reprising his role as a younger version of Weyland in Alien: Covenant.

=== Charlie Holloway ===
Charlie Holloway (Logan Marshall-Green) is an archaeologist who discovers star charts in caves around the world with his lover, Elizabeth Shaw. After awakening from cryosleep near LV-223, he introduces the purpose of the mission with Shaw. While the Prometheus flies over the moon, Holloway spots an artificial arrangement of structures and directs the ship to land near one. He goes with the first expedition crew to the concealed Juggernaut, discovers that the air is cleaner than anywhere on Earth and removes his helmet. After Shaw retrieves a preserved Engineer head, the expedition is informed of an incoming storm and Holloway and the rest of the crew return to the Prometheus. Disappointed by the Engineers' apparent extinction, he sulks and berates Shaw for still being a Christian. David brings Holloway a drink, and they discuss the merits of creating beings; he tainted the drink with a minute organism from a cylinder he brought from he structure, infecting Holloway. Holloway has sex with Shaw shortly afterwards, impregnating her with an alien embryo. After seeing a small, extraterrestrial parasite in his eye, Holloway returns to the Engineer ship and becomes ill. As the expedition returns, Holloway worsens; the infection becomes obvious, and Vickers obeys his request to kill him with a flamethrower outside the ship.

Logan Marshall-Green was first considered for Prometheus when casting director Avy Kaufman saw him in an Off-Off-Broadway play. Kaufman requested an audition tape for what she described as a "science-fiction film directed by Ridley Scott". Scott viewed the tape and offered Marshall-Green the role. In an Empire article, Marshall-Green described Holloway as a thrill-seeking scientist who "looks before he leaps". Unlike Shaw, his deeply religious lover, the actor described Holloway as a scientist, skeptic and atheist. Although Marshall-Green's performance was generally considered competent by critics, the character was criticized. Oliver Lyttelton of IndieWire was disappointed that Holloway contributed to the plot apart from his mutation. In a negative review of Prometheus, Nick Pinkerton of the Village Voice criticized a lack of chemistry between Shaw and Holloway.

=== Fifield ===
Fifield (Sean Harris) is a geologist on the Prometheus. After waking up, he rejects friendly overtures from Millburn and casts doubt on Shaw and Holloway's mission hypothesis. Fifield accompanies the expedition to an artificial structure and deploys his spectagraphs, which begin to develop a layout for the Juggernaut. When the expedition encounters a decapitated Engineer, Fifield abandons his research and leaves the group with Millburn following. They become lost, failing to rendezvous with the rest of the expedition who has left because of the storm, and find a mound of Engineer corpses and a hidden room containing the thawed, mutating black liquid. They also encounter Hammerpedes: extraterrestrial, eel-like creatures which attack them. Fifield decapitates one, and its corrosive blood melts his helmet. The deformed and mutated Fifield returns to the Prometheus, where he attacks the crew and murders several members before he is killed.

Harris reportedly joined the cast of Prometheus in February 2011 with Idris Elba and Kate Dickie. Harris described Fifield as an audience surrogate who is very cautious and questions dangerous situations. Jon Spaihts, author of Alien: Engineers (the original prequel), wrote Fifield as changing directly into an Alien from the black mutagen, tying the film into the Alien canon. During its evolution into Prometheus, Ridley Scott decided to diverge from the previous films and establish a separate canon. In a deleted take of Fifield's mutated face he is more deformed and reminiscent of an Alien, with an elongated cranium under the melted, translucent helmet, long arms and sharp teeth. The character's final depiction retained Fifield's human appearance.

=== Millburn ===
Millburn (Rafe Spall) is a biologist who is a part of the Prometheus expedition. After awakening, he tries to become friends with Fifield (who rejects him). Millburn joins the initial expedition to the Engineers' artificial structure concealing the Juggernaut, tagging along with Fifield after he is upset by the number of corpses. Separated from the rest of the expedition, they are stranded in the ship. Millburn and Fifield enter the room containing the thawed black liquid and encounter the Hammerpedes. When Millburn tries to pet one it attacks him, breaking his arm and jumping down his throat. When the crew of the Prometheus returns the next day, they find Millburn's body with the Hammerpede still in his throat.

Spall auditioned for another role, but Ridley Scott asked him to play Millburn. Trying to duplicate the reaction of the Alien cast to the chestburster scene, the director did not tell the Prometheus cast that a Hammerpede puppet was in the silicon replica of Spall's body; Kate Dickie's scream is genuine. The character of Milburn was criticized, since no biologist would touch an unidentified, extraterrestrial organism displaying hostility. Spall defended his character, citing a deleted scene where Millburn holds a smaller, docile Hammerpede.

== Introduced in Alien: Covenant (2017) ==
=== Walter One ===
Walter One (Michael Fassbender) is an android and first member of the Walter line – made to replace the David line – serving aboard the colony ship Covenant. Walter maintains the ship while the colonists are in cryosleep when there is an unexpected neutrino flare from a nearby star, which damages the ship, forcing him to awaken the crew. After Christopher Oram orders the ship to divert from Origae-6 for the closer and more habitable Engineer homeworld, Walter joins the expedition force that lands on the planet. In the ensuing Alien outbreak, he is attacked by a Neomorph, which bites off his hand. He joins the survivors in taking refuge at David's base, where he becomes acquainted with David, and their differences in programming are revealed in one another. Walter surmises that David killed Shaw and when he confronts him about this fact and refuses David's offer to join him, David impales him with a flute, seemingly destroying him. Walter temporarily recovers and engages David in a melee – David emerges victorious and assumes Walter's identity.

=== Daniels ===
"Danny" Daniels (Katherine Waterston) is a terraforming expert serving aboard the colony ship Covenant and the central protagonist of Alien: Covenant. She awakens from cryosleep when the ship is damaged by a neutrino burst from a nearby star, resulting in the death of her husband and the captain of Covenant, Jacob Branson. When Shaw's transmission is traced back to the habitable Engineer homeworld, Daniels repeatedly states her discontentment with veering off course with the new captain, Christopher Oram. Daniels joins the expedition down to the surface of the planet, where she discovers Shaw's identification card. When the lander explodes, Daniels prevents Christopher from getting himself killed and is subsequently attacked by a Neomorph. David intervenes, and Daniels joins him and the rest of the survivors back to his base. Daniels orders Tennessee to extract them immediately. She is assaulted by David, who forces himself on her, but Walter intervenes, allowing Daniels to reach the cargo lander. The lander is boarded by an Alien, prompting Daniels to exit the vehicle and help kill it herself. Aboard Covenant, which Daniels is now in command of, another Alien is detected, forcing her, Tennessee and David, (secretly disguised as Walter), to work together to dispose of it. Daniels and Tennessee lure the Alien to the terraforming bay, where they impale and eject it into space. The last human awake, Daniels is being returned to cryosleep by David, who inadvertently reveals his identity by not being able to recount Daniels' fantasy about building a log cabin by a lake, which she had previously recounted to Walter. Horrified, but unable to escape, Daniels is returned to stasis.

=== Christopher Oram ===
Christopher Oram (Billy Crudup) is the chief mate aboard the colony ship Covenant and the husband of Karine Oram. With Branson's death as a result of the neutrino flare from the nearby star, Christopher becomes the captain of Covenant, though he perceives his command as being questioned by Daniels and the other crew members due to his religious background. When Shaw's transmission is received from the habitable Engineer homeworld, Christopher orders Covenant to divert to the planet, though his judgment is met with protests from Daniels. After leading a ground expedition to the crashed Engineer ship, Christopher returns to the lander to see it explode. Christopher accepts David's aid on behalf of the survivors and accompanies David back to his base. He searches for Rosenthal, whom he finds decapitated, along with David communicating with the Neomorph that killed her. Christopher kills the Neomorph and holds David at gunpoint, demanding an explanation for his activities. David leads him to his makeshift laboratory, as well as a hatchery, where he keeps a number of Alien eggs. David goads Christopher into approaching an egg, which results in a Facehugger attacking and impregnating him. Christopher is awoken a short time later by David, only to have the first Alien chestburster erupt from his chest, killing him.

=== Tennessee ===
Tennessee (Danny McBride) is the pilot of the Covenant and Maggie Faris' husband. During a space walk to repair the solar recharge sails of the Covenant, Tennessee inadvertently intercepts a signal from Shaw, which prompts the colonization mission to divert towards the signal's source. While the brunt of the crew embarks on an excursion to the surface of the Engineer homeworld, Tennessee pilots Covenant in high orbit. Due to an ionic storm, he is unable to have adequate communication with the expedition. To regain communications, Tennessee brings Covenant dangerously close to the storm, which allows Daniels to privately reveal to him that Maggie is dead. Tennessee pilots a cargo lander down to the surface of the planet and extracts Daniels, Lope, and David impersonating Walter, assisting with killing an Alien in the process. Aboard Covenant, the crew is alerted to an Alien stowaway, prompting Tennessee to work with Daniels to dispose of it. They lure it to the terraforming bay, where it is ejected into space. Tennessee subsequently returns to cryosleep before Daniels does.

=== Lope ===
Dan Lope (Demián Bichir) is the ranking military officer aboard the Covenant who is married to Sergeant Hallett. Lope leads the excursion on the planet's surface to the crashed Engineer ship. On the journey back to the lander, Lope notices Hallett's condition deteriorating, which alarms him. Upon reaching the lander, the ship explodes and a Neomorph attacks while another bursts from his husband's throat. While searching for Oram, Lope is attacked by a Facehugger, but he is quickly and seemingly saved by Cole, who manages to cut it off him, though his face is severely burned by the acid in the process. As Cole is killed by a now mature Alien, Lope escapes with the other survivors to the cargo lander. Aboard Covenant, Lope receives medical treatment, but dies when an Alien erupts from his chest, revealing that despite the short time that the Facehugger was on him, it succeeded in impregnating him.

=== Karine Oram ===
Karine Oram (Carmen Ejogo) is a biologist aboard the Covenant who is married to Christopher Oram. After Branson dies and her husband becomes the new captain of the Covenant, Karine reassures him when he questions whether the crew respects him as their new leader. During the ground expedition towards the crashed Engineer ship, Karine diverts off the path to collect samples for research. Her escort, Ledward, becomes ill from his alien infestation, prompting Karine to help him back to the lander. While attempting to provide Ledward with medical assistance, Maggie Faris witnesses the beginnings of a severe infection on Ledward's back. Out of fear, she locks Karine in with him. A Neomorph bursts out of Ledward's back and mauls Karine to death.

=== Maggie Faris ===
Maggie Faris (Amy Seimetz) is the lander pilot serving aboard the Covenant and Tennessee's wife. Faris pilots the lander carrying the excursion team down through the ionic storm, to the surface of the planet. While the excursion team makes their way to the crashed Engineer ship, Faris stays with the lander, to calibrate its instruments and communicate with Tennessee. She receives communications from Karine Oram that Ledward is ill, prompting her to prepare the medical bay. Upon seeing Ledward's deadly and potentially contagious condition, Faris locks Karine and him in the medical bay, refusing to allow Karine to escape. When the Neomorph emerges and escapes the room, Faris arms herself and attempts to kill it. In the process, she inadvertently shoots a cache of stored explosives, causing the lander to explode. A burning Faris stumbles out of the ship and succumbs to her injuries on the foot ramp.

=== Ricks ===
Ricks (Jussie Smollett) is a navigator serving aboard the Covenant and Upworth's husband. While the excursion team departs down to the Engineer homeworld, Ricks stays in the cockpit of the Covenant alongside Tennessee and Upworth. As Tennessee brings the ship within eighty kilometers of the ionic storm, Ricks protests with his wife. When Tennessee looks to come within forty kilometers, Ricks once again protests with Upworth, but relents when she agrees to utilize the command override to reduce altitude. After the survivors from the excursion are rescued, Ricks and Upworth have sex in the shower. Midway through, a stowaway Alien prods Upworth with its tail and impales Ricks through the back of his head, killing him before moving on to Upworth.

=== Upworth ===
Upworth (Callie Hernandez) is a medic serving aboard the Covenant and Ricks's wife. She is the first crew member to imply a collective crew-hesitancy over returning to hypersleep after the ship's computer "Mother" locates the Denver song transmission's source. She stays aboard the Covenant with Tennessee and Ricks while the excursion team ventures down to the surface of the Engineer homeworld. When Tennessee takes the ship down to within eighty kilometers of the ionic storm, Upworth protests alongside her husband. After Tennessee receives word about the expedition's casualties and insists that the Covenant be brought down within forty kilometers of the ionic storm, putting the ship in jeopardy, Upworth protests again. However, she has a change of heart and cooperates with Tennessee by initiating the command override, allowing the ship to get dangerously close. After the survivors return to the Covenant, Upworth provides a rudimentary treatment for Lope's acid burns, though she admits he will need reconstructive surgery. Upworth and Ricks have sex in the shower but are interrupted when a stowaway Alien prods Upworth between her legs with its tail and kills Ricks, covering her in blood. The Alien kills her in the shower immediately afterward.

=== Hallett ===
Tom Hallett (Nathaniel Dean) is a military officer aboard the Covenant and Sergeant Lope's husband. He embarks on the expedition to the source of Shaw's signal. At the entrance of the crashed Engineer ship, Hallett observes mutated floral pods, which he squeezes, causing the airborne mutagen to be inhaled through his nose. By the time the expedition departs from the crash site, Hallett begins to show symptoms of the parasite, which worries Lope. As they make their way back to the lander, Hallett's condition drastically deteriorates. Upon reaching the lander, which explodes, a Neomorph bursts from Hallett's throat, killing him.

=== Ankor ===
Ankor (Alexander England) is a member of the security unit aboard the Covenant. Shortly after awakening from the neutrino burst, he attempts to save Branson from his cryosleep pod, but he is unable to in time and the captain is burned to death. Ankor assists Tennessee with the spacewalk for repairing the solar recharge sails. Ankor is a part of the expedition to the surface of the Engineer homeworld, where they set off to investigate the intercepted signal at the crashed Engineer ship. Upon returning to the lander and witnessing it explode, the expedition is ambushed by two Neomorphs. Ankor shoots one of them, but the creature responds by whipping his jaw off with its tail, killing him instantly.

=== Ledward ===
Ledward (Benjamin Rigby) is a member of the security unit aboard the Covenant. He is a member of the expedition tracking the signal leading to the crashed Engineer ship on the surface of the Engineer homeworld. Shortly after disembarking from the lander, Ledward is assigned by Lope to escort Karine Oram as she takes samples from the local ecosystem. Ledward excuses himself from his duties momentarily to smoke and urinate, during which time, he disturbs a mutated floral pod, causing airborne mutagen to enter his ear canal. His health immediately deteriorates and he is assisted to the lander by Karine. Inside the lander's medical bay, Faris locks Ledward and Karine in the room, where the first Neomorph bursts out of his spine, killing him.

== Introduced in Alien: Romulus (2024) ==
=== Rain Carradine ===
Marie Raines "Rain" Carradine (Cailee Spaeny) is an orphaned miner living and working in the colony Jackson's Star located on the ringed planet LV-410. In 2142, she fulfilled her work contract and expected to be released and allowed to leave to the planet Yvaga. However, the Weyland-Yutani Corporation doubled her contract hours, refusing her request to leave. She accompanies the crew of the Corbelan IV to attempt to dock with the abandoned research station Renaissance. Along with Andy and Tyler, she encounters the Xenomorph hive while attempting to reach the hangar. She saves Kay and escapes with Andy to the Corbelan IV. While preparing to depart with Andy and Kay, Kay gives birth to the Offspring, which kills Kay and attempts to kill Rain. She ejects the Offspring from the ship and leaves for Yvaga.

=== Andy Carradine ===
Andy Carradine (David Jonsson) is a malfunctioning android who was adopted and reprogrammed by Rain's father, who left Andy as a caretaker for Rain after his death. Due to being an older, malfunctioning model, Andy become more of a brother to Rain than the father he was intended to be. After arriving at the Renaissance with the crew of Corbelan IV, he is given new objectives by Rook, who wants to secure samples of the serum. Due to these objectives, he leads Rain and Tyler to the lab where he collects the samples. Along with Rain and Tyler, he discovers the Xenomorph hive and rescues Kay. He is injured by the Offspring while trying to escape the Renaissance, but survives and leaves with Rain for Yvaga after the Offspring is killed.

=== Tyler Harrison ===
Tyler Harrison (Archie Renaux) is Rain's ex-boyfriend and accompanies her to the Renaissance. Along with Andy and Rain, he goes to the lab to secure samples of serum and encounters the Xenomorph hive where they save Kay. He is killed by the Xenomorphs in the hive, sacrificing himself to save Rain.

=== Kay Harrison ===
Kay Harrison (Isabela Merced) is Tyler's pregnant younger sister. She accompanies the crew of the Corbelan IV to the Renaissance. She is badly injured by the Xenomorph and taken back to the nest where she is saved by her crewmates before injecting herself with a serum, unknowingly causing her unborn baby to form into the offspring alien. She later births the offspring and begins to secrete a strange mixture of breast milk and serum from her breasts. She is killed by her offspring when he begins to feed on her breast milk.

=== Bjorn ===
Bjorn (Spike Fearn) is Tyler and Kay's cousin and also the father of Kay's child (later becoming the offspring). On the Renaissance, he encounters the Xenomorphs cocoon and attempts to shock it. The cocoon explodes and the cocooned Xenomorph attacks him, stabbing him in the eye. He falls and is killed when the Xenomorph's acidic blood drips down onto his face.

=== Navarro ===
Navarro (Aileen Wu) is Bjorn's adoptive sister. She is attacked by a facehugger while on the Renaissance, which impregnates her with a chestburster. She is later killed when the chestburster emerges from her body.

=== Rook ===
Rook (Ian Holm) is an android based on Ash from the original film. He was the science officer on board the Renaissance before the Xenomorph kills the rest of the crew, severing Rook in half in the process. He later encounters the crew of the Corbelan IV when they board his ship. He connects himself to the ships computers and refuses to let the crew leave in Corbelan IV until the samples of Z-01 are on board. He is killed when the Renaissance crashes into the rings of LV-410.

=== Offspring ===
The Offspring (Robert Bobroczkyi) is a Xenomorph-Engineer-human hybrid born on Corbelan IV after Kay injects herself with a serum, causing her unborn baby to transform into the Offspring. After he is born, the offspring injures Andy and attacks Rain, who lures him into a cargo bay and eject the bay into the rings of LV-410, killing the Offspring.

== See also ==
- List of Predator characters
- List of Alien vs. Predator characters
