= Ellen Ripley =

Fictional character in the Alien franchise

- Alien character
- Sigourney Weaver as Ripley in Alien (1979)
- First appearance: Alien (1979)
- Last appearance: Dead by Daylight (2023)
- Created by: Dan O'Bannon; Ronald Shusett
- Portrayed by: Sigourney Weaver; Nicole Fellows (young; Ripley 8)
- Voiced by: Sigourney Weaver (Alien: Isolation); Andrea Deck (Alien: Isolation web series); Laurel Lefkow (Alien: Out of the Shadows and Alien: River of Pain); Lani Minella (Alien Resurrection video game); Molly Scarpine (Dead by Daylight)

In-universe information
- Species: Human
- Gender: Female
- Occupation: Lieutenant (First Class)
- Family: Alan Decker (grandson of Ripley 8)
- Spouses: Alex (first husband, deceased); Paul Carter (second husband, deceased)
- Children: Amanda Ripley (daughter, film canon deceased. Game canon alive.)
- Clones: Ripley 8 Ripleys 1–7

Lt. Ellen Louise Ripley, usually referred to by her surname, is a fictional character and the original protagonist of the Alien film series, played by American actress Sigourney Weaver. Considered one of the greatest characters in science fiction film history, the character earned Weaver worldwide recognition, and remains her most famous role to date.

Alien (1979) and its sequel Aliens (1986) were heralded for challenging gender roles, particularly in the science fiction, action, and horror genres. Weaver's performances are also highly praised: for Aliens, she earned her first Academy Award nomination for Best Actress, which is now seen as a landmark since the Academy, to that point, had given little recognition to the genres of science-fiction and horror. For her role in the franchise, Weaver has also been nominated for a Golden Globe Award for Best Actress in a Motion Picture Drama, a BAFTA Award for Best Leading Newcomer, and four Saturn Awards for Best Actress, winning one for Aliens.

Ripley is often considered one of the most significant female protagonists in cinematic history, and is a prominent figure in popular culture. Today, Ripley's influence extends beyond that of the original film franchise; she has appeared in novels, comic books and video games.

== Biography ==
=== Films ===
==== In Alien (1979) ====
Ripley is introduced as a warrant officer aboard the Nostromo, a spaceship en route to Earth from Thedus. Having been placed in stasis for the long journey home, the crew is awakened when the Nostromo receives a transmission of unknown origin from a nearby planetoid. Following their landing, an unknown creature infiltrates the ship, and kills every other member of the crew. Ripley is the only member to escape from the Nostromo prior to its explosion, which she deliberately started to kill the monster. However, she discovers that the Alien is also aboard the ship's shuttle, but expels it into space before putting herself in stasis for the return trip to Earth.

==== In Aliens (1986) ====
57 years later, Ripley awakes from her stasis. Her testimony regarding the Alien is met with extreme skepticism; she loses her space flight license as a result of what is perceived as questionable judgment. She also learns her daughter, Amanda, has died of old age. However, after contact is lost with a colony on LV-426 (the planet where her crew first encountered the Alien eggs), Ripley accompanies a group of Colonial Marines to investigate. They find the planet infested by many Aliens, who wipe out almost all of the marines. Ripley finally escapes the planet with Corporal Dwayne Hicks, the android Bishop, and Newt, a young girl who is the last surviving colonist. Back on the Sulaco, they are soon attacked by the surviving Alien Queen, which is finally expelled into space by Ripley. Ripley enters hypersleep alongside the three other survivors for the return to Earth.

==== In Alien 3 (1992) ====
The Sulaco launches an escape pod containing the four survivors, which then crashes on Fiorina 'Fury' 161, an abandoned foundry facility and penal colony. Ripley alone survives the crash. Unbeknownst to her, an Alien egg had been aboard the ship. Once hatched in the prison, the creature begins to kill inmates and guards, but strangely refuses to kill her. After rallying the inmates and preparing the defense against the creature, Ripley discovers the embryo of an Alien Queen growing inside her, thus realizing why she had not been attacked. After having killed the Alien by thermal shock, Ripley sacrifices herself by diving into a gigantic furnace just as the alien Queen begins to erupt from her chest, aiming to exterminate the final trace of the Aliens and prevent the Weyland-Yutani Corporation from using it as a biological weapon.

==== In Alien Resurrection (1997) ====
200 years after her sacrifice, scientists manage to use blood samples from Ripley and create Ripley 8 (Sigourney Weaver) and surgically retrieve the Alien Queen embryo from her body. The United Systems Military hopes to breed Aliens to study on the spaceship USM Auriga, using kidnapped hosts delivered to them by a group of mercenaries. The Aliens escape their enclosures, while Ripley and the mercenaries attempt to flee to the Betty. They must destroy the Auriga, lest it make its emergency landing and unleash Xenomorphs on Earth. Ripley is taken to the Alien nest, where the Queen gives birth to a Newborn, a Xenomorph with human traits. The hybrid Alien recognizes Ripley as its mother and kills the Queen. Ripley escapes to the Betty, where she tearfully kills the Newborn when it is discovered aboard attacking the other survivors. The Auriga crashes into Earth, destroying all the remaining Xenomorphs in a massive explosion. From the windows of the Betty, Ripley look down at Earth and, when asked what she wants to do next, says, "I'm a stranger here myself." In an alternate ending, the Betty lands in a ruined Paris.

==== In The Predator (2018) ====
After director Neill Blomkamp announced on February 19, 2015 that his next film would be a fifth Alien movie, Weaver confirmed on February 25 that she would reprise her role as Ripley in the film. On January 21, 2017, in response to a fan question on Twitter asking what the chances were of his Alien project actually happening, Blomkamp responded "slim." In April, Scott said he did not think the film would ever be made. He elaborated that there was never a complete script, just a 10-page pitch, that Fox decided they did not want to pursue any further. Commentators have noted this goes against Weaver's and James Cameron's statements about reading Blomkamp's script for the film, although it is possible Weaver and Cameron were referring to the pitch document. On May 1, 2017, Ridley Scott confirmed that the fifth film is not happening. An alternate ending for The Predator displaying a Weyland-Yutani Corp pod containing Ripley (played by Breanna Watkins) wearing a Weyland-Yutani breathing apparatus shaped like an Alien Facehugger was yet one among several references intended to further connect the Predator films to the Alien films.

=== Video games ===
==== In Aliens: Colonial Marines (2013) ====
Ripley has two cameos in the "Stasis Interrupted" DLC for the game. In this prequel campaign, Ripley is seen being impregnated by a facehugger and also appeared recreating the same final scene of Alien 3. The game also revealed that Hicks actually survived the events of Alien 3 as he was retrieved by another Colonial Marines team, with the body in the stasis chamber that crashed being another marine who was knocked into Hicks' pod during a firefight, dying when the EEV crashed. Ripley, Newt and Bishop's pods were ejected while Hicks had to go with the other Marines.

==== In Alien: Isolation (2014) ====
Ripley in Alien: Isolation

In 2014, Weaver reprised her role as Ripley for the first time in 17 years for a voice cameo in the video game Alien: Isolation, centered on Ripley's daughter Amanda, and more extensively in its two DLCs set during the events of Alien. This game, set 15 years after the events of Alien and 42 years before the events of Aliens, features Ripley's daughter Amanda. Amanda was originally introduced in the extended version of Aliens, when Ripley learns that during her 57-years long stasis, Amanda grew up, married, and died. In the game, Amanda investigates potential clues regarding her mother's disappearance, and goes to the space station Sevastopol in hope to find answers. Near the end of the game, Amanda ultimately finds a vocal message from her mother (voiced by Weaver), who added a personal message to the Nostromo's final log entry at the end of Alien addressed to Amanda, in which Ripley explains the true nature of the disappearance of the Nostromo, tells her she loves her, and hopes that she will get to hear this someday.

Weaver also reprises her role more extensively alongside several other original cast members in the game's two DLCs, set during the events of Alien. Ripley is joined by Dallas (Tom Skerritt), Lambert (Veronica Cartwright), Brett (Harry Dean Stanton), Parker (Yaphet Kotto) and Ash (Ian Holm, likeness only), allowing the player to play through two iconic scenes from the film. With the Nostromo Edition pre-order, the "Crew Expendable" bonus content allows gamers to play as one of the surviving crew members just after Brett's demise to entice the Alien to the ship's airlock. In the "Last Survivor", Ripley initiates the self-destruct sequence before escaping on the Narcissus.

=== Animated ===
==== In Alien: Isolation – The Digital Series (2019) ====
In the web animated series Alien: Isolation – The Digital Series, Ripley was voiced by Andrea Deck in voiceovers for Ripley's final moments to her daughter.

=== Biography of Ripley 8 ===
==== In Alien Resurrection (1997) ====
Two hundred years after Ripley's death, a clone of Ripley is successfully produced aboard the spaceship Auriga. Her DNA proved difficult to separate from that of the alien that was inside her during the events of Alien 3, so the first six clones were useless monstrosities. The seventh clone turned out human enough to warrant an attempt at retrieving the alien inside her, but this also ended in failure. The eighth clone proves successful, and becomes the central character of a new story. However, the separation was still not perfect. Number 8 has enhanced strength and reflexes, acidic blood, and an empathic link with the Aliens, and the aliens have slightly more human traits, including a browner skin coloration and changes to their reproductive cycle. Number Eight learns to talk and interact with humans, but soon Aliens escape their confinement and kill most of the crew. She escapes from her cell and later meets and joins a group of mercenaries; developing a close relationship with their youngest member, Annalee Call. The now fully-grown Alien Queen, having developed a womb because of Ripley's DNA, gives birth to a human-Alien hybrid, who kills the Queen and imprints on Number Eight as its mother. After escaping the Auriga in the Betty, Ripley kills the newborn Alien by using her own acidic blood to burn a hole through a viewing pane, causing the creature to be sucked violently through the small hole and into the vacuum of space, saving Call. In a scene included in the extended edition of the film (referenced in the events of Alien: Sea of Sorrows), the Betty lands on Earth and Ripley and Call discover that Paris is desolate.

==== In Aliens vs. Predator vs. The Terminator (2000) ====
The comic book Aliens versus Predator versus The Terminator continues the storyline of Ripley 8 after Resurrection, seeing Ripley 8 allying with the Predators to defeat both a new wave of Aliens and a group of Terminators created by a long-dormant Skynet program to reinvent itself if it was destroyed, culminating in Ripley 8 apparently sacrificing herself to destroy the original super-soldier/Terminator.

==== In Alien: Sea of Sorrows (2014) ====
At the beginning of Alien: Sea of Sorrows, set 200 years after the events of Alien Resurrection, it is revealed that the crashing of the Auriga at the end of Alien Resurrection caused the destruction in Paris seen at the end of that film. Additionally, the protagonist of the novel, Decker, is stated to be a descendant of Ellen Ripley, but there are several hints throughout the novel revealing that Decker's grandmother was actually Ripley 8 (mainly his empathic abilities, the fact Amanda Ripley-McClaren is stated to have had no children in Aliens, and when Decker is shown a picture of Ripley, he says that she is not the person he sees in his head).

=== Spin-off media ===
Ripley's life and career have been extensively expanded on in various spin-off comics and novels, many of which were written before her death on Fiorina 161, providing instead a chronology continuing on from the end of Aliens. In the Dark Horse novel series, Ripley appears at the end of Book 3, The Female War; but subsequent books, in order to bring the book continuity in line with the film continuity, reveal that she is actually an android created in Ripley's likeness and given false memories. All novels were rebooted in 2012, meaning the only canonical books featuring Ripley are Out of the Shadows (by Tim Lebbon), Sea of Sorrows (by James A. Moore) and River of Pain. In Out of the Shadows, Ripley is woken from stasis 37 years after the events of Alien, fights Xenomorphs alongside several miners, and is put in stasis again the end of the book with her memory of these events erased to spare her from the worst of the psychological trauma she has experienced. Ripley is mentioned repeatedly in Sea of Sorrows, which stars the grandson of Ripley 8, and appears in River of Pain, which takes place before and during the events of Aliens. An Audio-Animatronic Ripley was featured in the Alien scene of The Great Movie Ride at Disney's Hollywood Studios at Walt Disney World from 1989 to 2017.

== Production ==
Although Ripley was originally conceived as male for the first Alien film, director Ridley Scott decided early in production to make her a woman.

== Reception ==
Lara Cory of Little White Lies praised Ripley's character through a feminist lens, writing that Ripley was "not there for our viewing pleasure, recumbent and defined by the male lead", but was "there to carry the story and take us on a journey". Cory also praised Ripley's maternal relationship with the character Newt, writing that Ripley "unashamedly displays" "typically feminine characteristics and they're not condescended to, ignored or even inconvenient; on the contrary, Ripley's relationship with Newt is a driving force of her character and the narrative." Jarek Paul Ervin of Jacobin described Ripley as a "working-class hero", citing her conflict with the megacorporation Weyland-Yutani.

=== "Best-characters" lists ===
Ellen Ripley is often featured in lists of the best characters in film history: in 2008, American Film Institute ranked her as the eighth best hero in American film history in their list of the 100 greatest heroes and villains, the second highest ranked female character after Clarice Starling. In 2009, Entertainment Weekly ranked Ripley fifth on their list of The 20 All Time Coolest Heroes in Pop Culture, calling her "one of the first female movie characters who isn't defined by the men around her, or by her relationship to them." The same year, she was ranked #9 on Empire magazine's compilation of The 100 Greatest Movie Characters in 2008 and #5 in 2015, being the highest ranked female in both.

She was ranked eight on Premiere magazine's list of The 100 Greatest Movie Characters of All Time, with her Defining Moment being "Ripley's nervy refusal to open the ship's hatch so that Kane (John Hurt) can be admitted - with a thing attached to his face." She was the third highest ranked female of the list, after Annie Hall and Scarlett O'Hara. She was ranked 57 on Fandomania's list of the 100 Greatest Fictional Characters. In 2009, MTV selected her as the second Greatest Movie Badass Of All Time, the only women with Sarah Connor, ranked sixth. In 2011, UGO Networks ranked her the 75th Hottest Sci-Fi Girl of All Time. and website Total Sci-Fi ranked her first on their top of the 25 Women Who Shook Sci-Fi, stating "one of the most iconic characters in cinema history" and "one of the most critically analysed characters in the history of cinema." In 2011, Total Film ranked her the best female character of any film.

=== Awards and impact for Sigourney Weaver ===
For her performance in Alien, Weaver was nominated for a BAFTA Award for Most Promising Newcomer to Leading Film Roles and a Saturn Award for Best Actress. Although her performance had already been acclaimed in the first film, Aliens gave worldwide recognition to Weaver: she was the third horror actress in history (after Ellen Burstyn for The Exorcist and Sissy Spacek for Carrie) to be nominated for an Academy Award for Best Actress. She also received a nomination for the Golden Globe Award for Best Actress – Motion Picture Drama, and won the Saturn Award for Best Actress, the first award in her career (except a minor award, the Mystfest Award for Best Actress, won for Half Moon Street).

Weaver was also co-producer of the third and fourth films of the franchise. Although they were less successful critically, Weaver's performance was praised: she received her third and fourth Saturn Award for Best Actress nominations for both films and a nomination for a Blockbuster Entertainment Award for Favorite Actress – Sci-Fi for Alien Resurrection. Although she didn't win awards specifically for Alien 3 and Alien Resurrection, she won the Hasty Pudding Woman of the Year Award for her acting work during the 1997 film year, including Alien Resurrection, The Ice Storm and Snow White: A Tale of Terror.

Weaver won a DVDX Award for Best Audio Commentary (New for DVD) for her audio participation, among numerous other members of the crew, in the audio commentary of Alien in its 2003-reissue in Alien Quadrilogy. On his presentation speech about Weaver before rewarding her for her overall career with the Heroine Award at the 2010 Scream Awards, Aliens director James Cameron stated her main participations in film history as the Alien franchise, Ghostbusters and Avatar.

== Appearances ==
=== Films ===
- Alien (1979)
- Aliens (1986)
- Alien 3 (1992)
- Alien Resurrection (1997)
- The Predator (2018; deleted scene)

=== Animated ===
- Alien: Isolation – The Digital Series (2019)

=== Video games ===
- Aliens (1990 arcade game)
- Alien 3 (1992 NES & Sega Genesis Game)
- Alien Trilogy (1996)
- Aliens vs. Predator (2010)
- Aliens: Colonial Marines (2013)
- Alien: Isolation (2014)
- Aliens vs. Pinball (2016)
- Fortnite Battle Royale (2021)
- Dead by Daylight (2023)

=== Role-playing games ===
- Aliens Adventure Game (1991)

=== Comics ===
- Alien: The Illustrated Story (1979)
- Aliens: Outbreak (1988-1989)
- Aliens: Nightmare Asylum (1989-1990)
- Aliens: Female War (1990)
- Alien 3 (1992)
- Aliens: Newt's Tale (1992)
- Aliens: Space Marines (1992)
- Alien Resurrection (1997)
- Aliens versus Predator versus Terminator (2000)
- Aliens: Field Report (2014)

=== Novels ===
- Alien (1979)
- Aliens (1986)
- Alien 3 (1992)
- Aliens: Tribes (1992)
- Aliens: Earth Hive (1992)
- Aliens: Nightmare Asylum (1993)
- Aliens: The Female War (1993)
- Aliens: Music of the Spears (1996)
- Alien Resurrection (1997)
- Alien: Out of the Shadows (2014)
- Alien: Sea of Sorrows (2014)
- Alien: River of Pain (2014)
- Aliens: Bug Hunt (2017)

=== Books ===
- Alien: The Weyland-Yutani Report (2014)
- Jonesy: Nine Lives on the Nostromo (2018)

== In popular culture ==
- In the February 2019 animated film The Lego Movie 2: The Second Part, the character Rex Dangervest leads a team with velociraptors all believed to be named in reference to protagonists from classic 1970s/1980s movies, "Ripley" being one of them.
- In February 2021, Fortnite Battle Royale introduced Ripley as a cosmetic outfit.
- In August 2023, Dead by Daylight introduced Ripley, alongside the Xenomorph, as playable characters in the DLC Chapter 29: Alien.

== See also ==
- List of female action heroes and villains
- Ripley (crater)
