= Alien: Isolation – The Digital Series =

American animated science fiction horror streaming television series

- Promotional release poster
- Genre: Science fiction; Horror
- Based on: Alien franchise by; Dan O'Bannon; Ronald Shusett and; Alien: Isolation by Creative Assembly
- Developed by: Kinga Smith; Fabien Dubois
- Written by: Jeff Juhasz
- Story by: Dan Abnett; Dion Lay; Will Porter
- Directed by: Fabien Dubois
- Starring: Andrea Deck; George Anton; Richie Campbell; Sean Gilder; William Hope; Anthony Howell; Emerald O'Hanrahan; Jane Perry; Kezia Burrows; Syrus Lowe; Melanie Gutterbridge
- Composers: Joe Henson; Alexis Smith; Christian Henson
- Country of origin: United States
- Original language: English
- No. of seasons: 1
- No. of episodes: 7

Production
- Executive producers: George Goldman; Julien Mokrani; Eric Fantone
- Producers: Steve Tzirlin; Sarah Kinga Smith
- Editor: Romain Rioult
- Camera setup: Single-camera
- Running time: 8–14 minutes
- Production companies: Reverse Engineering Studios (RES); TitraFilm; DVgroup; 20th Century Fox; IGN

Original release
- Network: IGN
- Release: February 28, 2019

Alien: Isolation – The Digital Series is an American adult animated science fiction horror web series directed by Fabien Dubois, based on the Alien franchise created by Dan O'Bannon and Ronald Shusett, and the 2014 video game of the same name by Creative Assembly, that premiered on February 28, 2019, on IGN. The series was developed by Kinga Smith and Fabien Dubois and features most of the actors from the game reprising their roles. It takes place fifteen years after the events of Alien and follows Amanda Ripley, daughter of Alien protagonist Ellen Ripley, as she investigates the disappearance of her mother aboard a decaying space station.

== Synopsis ==
The series takes place fifteen years after the original film and follows Amanda Ripley, daughter of Ellen Ripley, as she accompanies a Weyland-Yutani team being sent to retrieve the flight recorder of the Nostromo (recently located by the crew of salvage vessel Anesidora and being held aboard the Seegson Corporation's remote Sevastopol space station in orbit around the KG-348 gas giant) at the request of Christopher Samuels, an android working for the Weyland-Yutani Corporation, so that Ripley can have closure regarding the fate of her missing mother. Ripley, Samuels, and Weyland-Yutani corporate counsel Nina Taylor travel to Sevastopol aboard the Torrens, a courier ship, only to find the station damaged and its communications offline. After attempting to spacewalk over to the station to investigate, their EVA line is severed by debris, and Ripley is separated from the others and forced to enter the station on her own, encountering hostile worker androids, violent human survivors, and an unknown alien organism that stalks her throughout the station.

== Cast and characters ==
=== Main ===
- Andrea Deck as Amanda Ripley, a freelance ship's engineer determined to learn the fate of her missing mother, Ellen
  - Deck also voices Ellen Ripley in episodes 6 and 7.
  - Kezia Burrows provided the motion capture and likeness for Amanda Ripley
- Anthony Howell as Christopher Samuels, an android and senior employee of the Weyland-Yutani Corporation assigned to lead the team sent to collect Nostromo's flight recorder
- Emerald O'Hanrahan as Nina Taylor, and up-and-coming lawyer in Weyland-Yutani's legal division tasked with ensuring that the company is absolved of responsibility for the loss of Nostromo
- Sean Gilder as Henry Marlow, captain of Anesidora and a survivor trapped aboard Sevastopol

=== Recurring ===
- Richie Campbell as Ricardo
  - Syrus Lowe provided the motion capture and likeness for Ricardo
- William Hope as Colonial Marshal Waits, Sevastopol's chief law enforcement officer

=== Guests ===
- Jane Perry as Diane Verlaine, captain of the Torrens (episode 1)
- George Anton as Axel, a survivor and employee of the Sevastopol's maintenance department who teaches Amanda survival skills (episode 2)
- Melanie Gutteridge as Catherine Foster (episode 4)

== Episodes ==
No.	Episode	Directed by	Written by	Original release date
1	Episode 1	Fabien Dubois	Jeff Juhasz	February 28, 2019
Fifteen years after her mother disappeared on the deep space towing ship Nostromo, Amanda Ripley travels to a remote space station that may hold clues to her mother's fate. But disaster strikes as she arrives at her destination.
2	Episode 2	Fabien Dubois	Jeff Juhasz	February 28, 2019
Amanda discovers that the space station Sevastopol is anything but a safe haven. And mechanical failures and violent colonists aren't the only dangers on the facility.
3	Episode 3	Fabien Dubois	Jeff Juhasz	February 28, 2019
Sevastopol's mystery killer hunts Amanda as she searches for her missing companions.
4	Episode 4	Fabien Dubois	Jeff Juhasz	February 28, 2019
Marlow reveals how the alien came to Sevastopol, and Amanda partners with Colonial Marshal Waits to hunt the creature.
5	Episode 5	Fabien Dubois	Jeff Juhasz	February 28, 2019
Amanda discovers that Sevastopol's android caretakers have an agenda of their own, and powerful outside forces have put everyone's lives in danger.
6	Episode 6	Fabien Dubois	Jeff Juhasz	February 28, 2019
With the alien threat multiplying, Amanda pursues Marlow back to his ship, where the salvager reveals one last secret.
7	Episode 7	Fabien Dubois	Jeff Juhasz	February 28, 2019
Amanda discovers that the alien infestation has grown beyond her worst fears. Her only hope of survival is a shot in the dark.

== Production ==
=== Development ===
On February 13, 2019, Bloody Disgusting reported that two Alien television series were in development, one animated, one live-action. On February 20, 2019, Axis Animation reported that a seven-episode animated adaptation of the 2014 video game Alien: Isolation was in development. On February 27, 2019, it was announced that IGN had given the production of an Alien: Isolation miniseries a series order to consist of seven quarter-hour episodes, each consisting of a combination of cut scenes from the game, newly rendered scenes, and first-person segments in the game that were re-shot and edited for the purposes of the streaming television series, to be exclusively released on IGN the following day. The series was set to be written by Jeff Juhasz and produced by Reverse Engineering Studios (RES) and DVgroup.

=== Casting ===
Alongside the initial series announcement, it was reported that the cast of the original Alien: Isolation game would reprise their characters for the series, including Andrea Deck as Amanda and Ellen Ripley.

== Release ==
=== Marketing ===
On February 27, 2019, the official trailer was released which included the announcement that the show would premiere on February 28, 2019.
