= Alien: Isolation 2 =

Upcoming survival horror video game

- Developer: Creative Assembly
- Publisher: Sega
- Director: Alistair Hope
- Series: Alien
- Engine: Unreal Engine 5
- Platforms: Nintendo Switch 2; PlayStation 5; Windows; Xbox Series X/S
- Release: 2027
- Genre: Survival horror
- Mode: Single-player

Alien: Isolation 2 is an upcoming survival horror video game developed by Creative Assembly and published by Sega. It is a sequel to Alien: Isolation (2014) and part of the Alien franchise. The game has been announced for Nintendo Switch 2, PlayStation 5, Windows, and Xbox Series X/S.

== Gameplay and premise ==
Alien: Isolation 2 retains the survival horror and stealth-based structure of the original game, with players avoiding a persistent Xenomorph rather than confronting it directly. Gameplay shown in hands-on previews included hiding under tables, moving through vents and floor grates, listening for the Alien's movement, repairing damaged systems, and avoiding noise that could reveal the player's position.

The game takes place a few months after the events of Alien: Isolation. The playable character shown in preview builds is Blake, a member of a Weyland-Yutani survey team on a remote colony world. Blake and her team investigate a crashed vessel connected to Sevastopol Station, which brings them into contact with the Xenomorph.

The setting includes a storm-ravaged colony world and the Weyland-Yutani outpost Kurosaki Station. Sega described the planet's surface and the outpost as a new hunting ground for the Alien, requiring players to improvise with tools, techniques, and tactics to survive. Hands-on previews also described exterior areas, including a dead forest and storm-threatened crash site, alongside more claustrophobic interior spaces similar to the first game.

== Development ==
After the release of Alien: Isolation, sequel ideas were discussed within Creative Assembly. In December 2014, lead game designer Gary Napper said that the studio had discussed sequel concepts, and that a possible sequel could retain the first game's focus on a single Alien while expanding environmental interaction. In 2015, studio director Tim Heaton said that a sequel was possible, but questioned whether Sega would fund another expensive AAA project after Alien: Isolation sold about 2.1 million copies without becoming a major commercial breakout. By 2017, a sequel was not in active development, and most of the original game's design team had left the studio.

Creative Assembly announced that a sequel was in early development on 7 October 2024, the tenth anniversary of Alien: Isolation. The announcement was made by Alistair Hope, who had been creative director on the original game. Dion Lay, co-writer of Alien: Isolation, credited Disney's acquisition of 20th Century Fox in 2019 as making an Alien: Isolation sequel "a lot more possible" as Disney wanted to use their newly acquired IP. Alien: Isolation 2 took 12 years to materialise due to the first game's initial mixed critical reception upon release with its subsequent reappraisal in the years since contributing to the sequel eventually being greenlit. Animation director Simon Ridge said that going into production for a sequel immediately after Alien: Isolation released would mean the studio "wouldn't have had this great opportunity to get perspective" on what players appreciated from Alien: Isolation as livestreaming horror games on Twitch and YouTube became more popular. Hope did not want the sequel to simply recreate the original game again and used player feedback to inform how to meaningfully build "a better experience for the sequel". Hope said in 2026 that he had thought about a sequel before the first game was finished, and that the sequel was designed as an evolution of the original game's unscripted, systemic survival horror structure. He said the sequel would combine interior and exterior spaces while retaining the original game's emphasis on line of sight, evasion, and the use of tools to distract or disrupt threats. Art director Ana Sopikova said the sequel would place the Alien on an "unsuspecting colony world", with areas ranging from colony interiors to storm-ravaged landscapes around Kurosaki Station.

Alien: Isolation 2 moves from the proprietary Cathode engine to Unreal Engine 5 with Creative Assembly building their own lighting and audio technology for the title. Creative director Alistair Hope said the move to Unreal Engine 5 "allows us to iterate much faster" in a way the studio couldn't during the development of Alien: Isolation. Hope and Ridge described the work as an extension of the original game's technical and creative approach. Hope and Ridge said the sequel continued to use the 1979 film Alien as a creative reference, while expanding the setting through new environments.

== Release ==
In April 2026, Sega released a teaser trailer titled "False Sense of Security". The teaser showed a dark interior, a rainy exterior area and an emergency telephone booth resembling the save stations from Alien: Isolation. The game was formally revealed at Summer Game Fest on 5 June 2026, where its title, footage and platforms were shown. The reveal trailer showed a stormy colony world and dialogue referring to Weyland-Yutani. Hands-on previews after Summer Game Fest 2026 focused on an early opening sequence in which Blake crosses an exterior colony area, enters a crashed vessel connected to Sevastopol, restores power, and first encounters the Xenomorph. Critics noted that the demo retained the original game's emphasis on hiding, sound, line of sight, and player vulnerability rather than direct combat. Several previews highlighted the contrast between the sequel's open planetary areas and the claustrophobic interiors associated with the first game. However, Game Informer and Den of Geek noted that the demo did not fully show how the Xenomorph would behave in outdoor spaces.
