= Andrew Crawford (dancer) =

Australian ballet dancer

Andrew Crawford is an Australian ballet danseur performing with the Morphoses/The Wheeldon Company, having previously danced with The Monte Carlo Ballet (Les Ballet de Monte Carlo), the Dutch National Ballet, Sydney Dance Company.

Crawford is the brother of halfpipe Snowboarder Holly Crawford. He portrays a neomorph in the science fiction horror film Alien: Covenant. He has also been credited for roles in Brine King and King Ricou in Aquaman as well as the Creature in Sweetheart.
