= Alien: Isolation =

2014 video game

- Developer: Creative Assembly
- Publisher: Sega
- Director: Alistair Hope
- Producers: Jonathan Court; Oli Smith
- Designers: Gary Napper; Clive Lindop
- Programmer: Clive Gratton
- Artist: Jude Bond
- Writers: Dan Abnett; Dion Lay; Will Porter
- Composers: Christian Henson; Joe Henson Alexis Smith
- Series: Alien
- Platforms: PlayStation 3; PlayStation 4; Windows; Xbox 360; Xbox One; Linux; OS X; Nintendo Switch; Android; iOS
- Release: 7 October 2014: PS3, PS4, Win, X360, XOne; 7 October 2014; Linux; 29 September 2015; OS X; 28 October 2015; Nintendo Switch; 5 December 2019; Android, iOS; 16 December 2021
- Genres: Action-adventure, stealth, survival horror
- Mode: Single-player

Alien: Isolation is a 2014 survival horror game developed by Creative Assembly and published by Sega for PlayStation 3, PlayStation 4, Windows, Xbox 360, and Xbox One. Based on the Alien film series, the game is set 15 years after the original 1979 film, and follows the engineer Amanda Ripley, voiced by Andrea Deck. Amanda investigates the disappearance of her mother, Ellen Ripley, aboard the space station Sevastopol, which is in disarray due to years of corporate negligence and the threat of a rampant alien creature. The game emphasizes stealth gameplay, requiring the player to avoid, outsmart, and fight enemies with an assortment of tools and weapons.

Alien: Isolation was designed to resemble the original Alien film rather than its more action-oriented 1986 sequel Aliens, and features a similar lo-fi, 1970s vision of what the future could look like. It runs on an engine built to accommodate the alien's behaviour and technical aspects such as atmospheric and lighting effects. Creative Assembly intended to make Alien: Isolation a third-person game, but used first-person to create a more intense experience. Several downloadable content packs were released, some of which relive scenes from the original film.

Alien: Isolation received positive reviews and sold over two million copies by May 2015. Its retro-futuristic art direction, sound design, and artificial intelligence were praised, while its length received some criticism. Considered one of the best games ever made, Alien: Isolation won several year-end awards, including Best Audio at the 2015 Game Developers Choice Awards and Audio Achievement at the 11th British Academy Games Awards. It saw ports to Linux and OS X in 2015, Nintendo Switch in 2019, and Android and iOS mobile devices in 2021. It was also added to the Amazon Luna service in 2021. A web series adaptation was released in 2019. A sequel, Alien: Isolation 2, was announced in 2024 and formally revealed in 2026.

== Gameplay ==
Alien: Isolation is a single-player action-adventure game with an emphasis on stealth and survival horror. The player controls Amanda Ripley from a first-person perspective, and must explore a space station and complete mission objectives to progress forward in the story while avoiding, outsmarting, and defeating enemies. Specific objectives vary across each of the nineteen missions, but can range from activating computers, talking to NPCs, collecting certain items or reaching specific areas. The player can run, climb ladders, sneak into vents, crouch behind objects to break the line of sight with enemies, and peek over or lean around for a safe view. The player also has the ability to go under tables or inside empty lockers and cabinets to hide from enemies.

Amanda encounters various enemies throughout the station, including hostile human survivors and androids. The player can either eliminate them or avoid them using stealth or distractions. The main antagonist, the Alien (or otherwise referred to by the game's characters as "The Creature"), appears briefly during certain sections across the first four missions, but begins continuously pursuing the player after the completion of mission five, "The Quarantine". The Alien cannot be defeated, requiring the player to use stealth tactics in order to survive. Instead of following a predetermined path, the Alien has the ability to actively investigate disturbances and hunt the player by sight or sound. Along the way, the player can use both a flashlight and a motion tracker to detect the Alien's movements. However, using any of these increases the chance of the Alien finding the player. For example, if the Alien is close enough, it will be attracted by the tracker's sound, forcing the player to use the tracker wisely and remove it as soon as it detects motion. The motion tracker cannot detect enemies when they are not moving and cannot determine if the Alien is up in the ducts or on ground level. On the game's hardest difficulty setting, Nightmare, the motion tracker is unreliable and the in game mini-map, used to navigate and locate objectives, is unavailable.

The player can use the motion tracker to track the Alien's location. When movement is detected in front of the tracker, a circle will appear on its screen, indicating where the movement is located.

Although Amanda gains access to a revolver, shotgun, bolt gun, flamethrower, and stun baton over the course of the game, Alien: Isolation emphasizes evasion over direct combat by providing limited ammunition. The player can also craft useful items by collecting schematics and different materials. Items include EMP detonators, noisemakers, molotov cocktails, and pipe bombs; these can help the player deal with enemies. For example, the noisemaker can be used to attract enemies in a particular direction. The Alien is afraid of fire, so using flame weapons will force it to temporarily retreat. The player has a limited amount of health which decreases when attacked by enemies; health is restored with medkits, which can be crafted with materials in Amanda's inventory, although all of the Alien's attacks (unless it is retreating) will result in instant death.

The space station is divided into sections connected by trams and elevators. Some doors require certain actions before entry is allowed; for example, some require a keycard or entry codes, while others need to be hacked by an access tuner or cut open with a welding torch. Computer terminals and rewiring stations can be used to access information and trigger actions such as disabling security cameras or manipulating the station's air-purification and alarm mechanism. These actions may help to momentarily divert the attention away from the player's position. To save game progress, the player needs to locate a save station terminal and insert Amanda's access card. There is a three second pause before the save can be completed, meaning the player can be killed while attempting to save. If Amanda dies, the player will have to restart from the last saved point. In addition to the campaign mode, Alien: Isolation features a special mode, called Survivor Mode, in which the player must complete objectives within a time limit on different challenge maps while being hunted by the Alien.

== Plot ==
In 2137, fifteen years after Ellen Ripley went missing onboard the USCSS Nostromo, her daughter Amanda Ripley learns from Weyland-Yutani android Christopher Samuels that the Nostromo's flight recorder has been recovered and taken to Sevastopol, a space station owned by Seegson Corporation which orbits the gas giant KG-348 in the Zeta Reticuli system. Samuels offers Amanda a place on the retrieval team to give her closure, and she accepts. Amanda, Samuels and Weyland-Yutani executive Nina Taylor travel to the station via the USCSS Torrens with the help of the ship's captain Diane Verlaine. After finding the station too damaged to dock, the trio attempt to enter it via a spacewalk, but their EVA line is severed by an explosion, and Amanda is separated from the others.

Making her way through the station, Amanda discovers that it has descended into chaos due to the presence of a hostile alien creature onboard. She eventually finds the flight recorder, but discovers that its data has been corrupted. Amanda then makes her way to Samuels and Taylor; retrieving medical supplies for an injured Taylor, she meets Marshal Waits and follows him back to his bureau. There, Amanda meets the imprisoned captain of the USCSS Anesidora, Henry Marlow, who explains he recovered the flight recorder and went to LV-426, where his wife was impregnated by a facehugger before she fatally birthed the creature on Sevastopol. Waits convinces Amanda to lure the creature to one of the station's modules, where it can be ejected into space. However, Waits ejects the module with Amanda still inside, forcing her to space-jump back to Sevastopol using a space suit.

Amanda returns to the bureau to confront Waits, but before she arrives Sevastopol's service androids begin killing the remaining humans, including Waits. Working with Waits' deputy Ricardo, Amanda links up with Samuels, who sacrifices himself to help her access the control core of Sevastopol's artificial intelligence APOLLO and is destroyed in the process. Amanda also learns from Ricardo that Taylor was secretly sent to retrieve the creature and freed Marlow. At the core, Amanda discovers Weyland-Yutani purchased Sevastopol from Seegson before she arrived at the station, ordering APOLLO to protect the creature at all costs. Amanda informs APOLLO that the creature is no longer onboard, but it responds by stating that "reactor scans are unverified". Descending into the reactor, Amanda finds a nest with numerous aliens, and initiates a reactor purge in an attempt to destroy it. However, this inadvertently forces the aliens to leave the nest, and they begin to hunt Amanda again.

Ricardo informs Ripley that Marlow has returned to the Anesidora, and she follows him. There, Amanda discovers a personal message from Ellen before being confronted by Marlow, who attempts to overload the ship's reactor to destroy Sevastopol and the aliens. Taylor, who also went to the Anesidora, knocks out Marlow but is too late to stop the overload and both are killed in the subsequent explosion, forcing Amanda to flee the ship before it is destroyed. The explosion damages Sevastopol's orbital stabilizers, causing the station to slowly drift into KG-348's atmosphere. Amanda contacts Verlaine for extraction, but a facehugger attacks Ricardo, forcing her to leave him. After helping the Torrens detach from the station, Amanda enters the ship just before Sevastopol is destroyed. However, she finds an alien has boarded the Torrens and killed Verlaine as well; cornered into an airlock, she ejects both herself and it into space. Some time later, a searchlight finds an adrift and unconscious Amanda.

== Development ==

Like the original Alien film, Alien: Isolation features a lo-fi, '70s vision of what the future would look like. These concept artworks show both the exterior and interior of the game's main setting, the Sevastopol space station.

Alien: Isolation was developed by Creative Assembly, which is best known for their work on the Total War strategy video game series. A game based on the Alien series from 20th Century Fox was conceived when Creative Assembly finished Viking: Battle for Asgard in 2008, after the publisher, Sega, acquired the rights to develop Alien games in December 2006. A six-person team developed the first prototype to pitch the idea, wherein one player would control the Alien manually while another would conceal themselves in an environment and try to hide from the creature. The game captured the attention of Sega and the project was eventually approved. As Creative Assembly had no experience with survival horror games, it hired people from studios such as Bizarre Creations, Black Rock, Crytek, Ubisoft, and Realtime Worlds. According to the director, Alistair Hope, the team grew from "a couple of guys crammed in with the Total War team" to 100 by 2014.

Creative Assembly designed the game more in line with Ridley Scott's 1979 film Alien than James Cameron's more action-oriented 1986 sequel Aliens. To help them authentically recreate the atmosphere of the film, Fox provided three terabytes of original production material, including costume photography, concept art, set design, photos, videos and sound effects. The artist John Mckellan said, "It was a proper gold mine. We saw angles of things we'd never seen before." During the first stage of development, the developers deconstructed the film to find out what made its setting unique. This would allow them to build new environments that were faithful to it. The composers deconstructed the film soundtrack to identify the main cues and extend the soundtrack to fill in the length of the game. The developers also met the Alien and Blade Runner editor Terry Rawlings, who gave them additional insight.

Rather than pursue a shiny, high-tech science fiction look, the designers recreated the setting and feel of Alien using the work of the concept artists Ron Cobb and Mœbius. As a result, the game features a lo-fi, 1970s vision of the future, with features "clunky" machinery such as phone receivers, monochrome displays and distorted CRT monitors. To create period-authentic distortion on the in-game monitors, the developers recorded their animations onto VHS and Betamax, then filmed those sequences playing on an old portable television while adjusting the tracking settings. As digital hacking had not been conceived in the 1970s, the hacking device was built the way it would have been built on the set of the film, and requires players to tune into a computer's signal while selecting icons on its screen. The team had a rule of not creating anything that the film crew could not have created as a prop in 1979.

Creative Assembly wanted Alien: Isolation to have a story that was closely related to the film. They explored a story set 15 years after the film which would involve Ellen Ripley's daughter and the Nostromo's flight recorder. The writer Will Porter said creating the backstory for Amanda was "refreshing" as he felt that she was an overlooked character. The actress Sigourney Weaver reprised her role as Ellen Ripley to voice small sections because she felt that the story was interesting and true to the film. Along with Weaver, the original Alien cast, which includes Tom Skerritt, Veronica Cartwright, Harry Dean Stanton, and Yaphet Kotto, reprised their roles for the separate downloadable content missions, marking the first time they were reunited since the release of the film. All the characters were created with 3D face scans. The story was rewritten about a year before release; elements of the previous story were discovered in a console build.

Alien: Isolation runs on a proprietary engine that was built from scratch by Creative Assembly. Previously used in Viking: Battle for Asgard, the engine was adapted to accommodate technical aspects such as the atmospheric and lighting effects and the Alien's behavioural design. The engine's deferred rendering allowed artists to place "hundreds" of dynamic lights in a scene and achieve great geometric detail. A major toolchain update occurred six months into development. Although the new tools eventually improved workflow, they initially caused major disruptions because previous work had to be discarded or ported into the new tools, taking valuable development time away from the team. The Alien was designed to look similar to H. R. Giger's original design, including the skull underneath its semitransparent head. However, the designers did alter its humanoid legs with recurved ones to provide the Alien a walk cycle that would hold up to scrutiny during longer encounters with the player. Between 70 and 80 different sets of animation for the Alien were created. The Alien's artificial intelligence was programmed with a complex set of behavioural designs that slowly unlock as it encounters the player, creating the illusion that the Alien learns from each interaction and appropriately adjusts its hunting strategy. The gameplay designer Gary Napper said, "We needed something that would be different every time you played it. You're going to die a lot, which means restarting a lot, and if the Alien was scripted, you'd see the same behaviour. That makes the Alien become predictable, and a lot less scary." The save system was inspired by a scene in the film where Captain Dallas uses a key-card to access Nostromo's computer, Mother.

The developers originally planned to add a feature that would allow players to craft weapons, but the idea was ultimately discarded. According to Hope, "We thought about what people would want to do in order to survive. We explored different ideas, and one of them was fashioning weapons to defend yourself. That was quite early on, but then we realised that this game isn't really about pulling the trigger." Another cancelled feature was the Alien's iconic acid blood as a game mechanic, which could melt through metal like in the film. Although the feature was reportedly implemented at one point, it was removed because the developers felt it would take the game in a "weird" direction. Although the game is played from a first-person perspective, it was developed for a considerable amount of time in third-person view. The perspective was changed after the team realised that first person changed the gameplay experience significantly. Hope explained that, in third-person view, Alien: Isolation would have become "a game about jockeying the camera and looking after your avatar. But in first-person it's you that's being hunted. If you're hiding behind an object and you want to get a better view of your surroundings, you have to move." Development took four years after Creative Assembly pitched the idea to Sega. Alien: Isolation was released to manufacturing on 9 September 2014. It is dedicated to Simon Franco, a programmer who died during development.

== Marketing and release ==
Alien: Isolation was first unveiled on 12 May 2011 when UK government minister Ed Vaizey visited Creative Assembly and revealed on his Twitter account that the studio was hiring for an Alien game. Although no gameplay details were confirmed, Sega confirmed that Isolation would be released for consoles. Sega boss Mike Hayes said it was "very much a triple-A project. We want this to be a peer to the likes of Dead Space 2." Although the game's name was anticipated following a trademark registration in October 2013 and some screenshots leaked in December 2013, Alien: Isolation was announced and confirmed for PlayStation 3, PlayStation 4, Windows, Xbox 360, and Xbox One with the release of a teaser trailer on 7 January 2014. The fact that Sega's previous Alien game, Aliens: Colonial Marines, received a negative public reaction did not affect Creative Assembly. According to Napper, the vocal reaction from the Alien fanbase assured the team that they were building a game the fanbase wanted.

Alien: Isolation was presented at E3 2014, where journalists had a chance to play the game. Polygon described the demo as effective and terrifying. The game was also playable on the Oculus Rift virtual reality (VR) headset that was shown at the show. It was awarded Best VR Game and was nominated for Game of the Show, Best Xbox One Game, Best PlayStation 4 Game, Best PC Game, and Best Action Game at the IGN's Best of E3 2014 Awards. At the 2014 Game Critics Awards, it was nominated for Best of Show, Best Console Game, and Best Action/Adventure Game. In August 2014, a cinematic trailer was shown at Gamescom.

Alien: Isolation was released on 7 October 2014. Isolation was ported by Feral Interactive to Linux and OS X in late 2015, to Nintendo Switch on 5 December 2019, and to Android and iOS devices on 16 December 2021, and was added to the Amazon Luna service on 14 October 2021.

=== Downloadable content ===
Alien: Isolation supports additional in-game content in the form of downloadable content packs. The first two packs, Crew Expendable and Last Survivor, were made available at the time of release. Crew Expendable, included in the "Nostromo Edition", relives a scene from Alien and involves the player controlling Ripley, Dallas or Parker attempting to flush an Alien from the Nostromo's air vents into the ship's airlock. Last Survivor, which was originally made available to players who pre-ordered at certain retailers, is set during the film's finale and involves the player controlling Ripley as she tries to activate the Nostromo's self-destruct sequence and reach the escape shuttle.

Between October 2014 and March 2015, five additional downloadable content packs were released, expanding the Survivor Mode with new features. A season pass to these five Survivor Mode packs could be purchased before they were released. The first pack, Corporate Lockdown, was released on 28 October 2014 and includes three new challenge maps where the player must complete certain objectives. The second pack, Trauma, was released on 2 December 2014 and includes a new character for use in three additional challenge maps. The third pack, Safe Haven, was released on 13 January 2015 and introduces a new character and a new gameplay mode where the player must complete a series of missions under a time limit. The fourth pack, Lost Contact, which was released on 10 February 2015, is similar to Safe Haven, but offers a different playable character and setting. The last pack, The Trigger, was released on 3 March 2015 and includes three additional challenge maps and a new playable character. A collection featuring the base game and all the downloadable content packs was released for Linux, OS X, PlayStation 4 and Xbox One in late 2015.

== Music and sound design ==
Isolation's music was produced by English duo The Flight and Christian Henson. Isolation's sound design was produced by sound designers Byron Bullock and Sam Cooper. Together, music and sound design was nominated for six awards in 2014-2015 and won four of them, namely the "Audio Achievement" award at the 11th British Academy Games Awards, for best audio at the 15th Game Developers Choice Awards and the "Sound Effects" and "Use of Sound, Franchise" at the 14th National Academy of Video Game Trade Reviewers awards.

In 2024, for the game's 10th anniversary, the soundtrack was officially released on vinyl, cassette and streaming by Hollywood Records. Sega also partnered with the Lofi Girl music label for an ambiance music YouTube video.

== Reception ==
=== Sales ===
In the United Kingdom, Alien: Isolation debuted at number two on the all-formats sales chart, behind only FIFA 15. According to Sega, Isolation had sold more than one million copies worldwide by January 2015. By March, it had sold over 2.1 million copies in Europe and the US, below the expectations of Sega.

=== Critical response ===
Reception

Aggregate score
Aggregator	Score
Metacritic	PC: 81/100; PS4: 79/100; XONE: 78/100; NS: 83/100 iOS: 83/100

Review scores
Publication	Score
Destructoid	8.5/10
Electronic Gaming Monthly	8/10
Eurogamer	8/10
Game Informer	7.75/10
GameRevolution	4.5/5
GameSpot	6/10
GamesRadar+	4.5/5
GameTrailers	7.4/10
IGN	5.9/10
PC Gamer (US)	93/100
Polygon	6.5/10
The Guardian	5/5
TouchArcade	5/5

Critical reception for Alien: Isolation was "generally favourable", according to review aggregator Metacritic. Josh Harmon of Electronic Gaming Monthly felt that Alien: Isolation "succeeds as a genuine effort to capture the spirit of the film franchise in playable form, rather than a lazy attempt to use it as an easy backdrop for a cash-in with an ill-fitting genre". Writing for GameSpot, Kevin VanOrd praised the tense and frightening gameplay, stating that "when all mechanics are working as intended, alien-evasion is dread distilled into its purest, simplest form". However, he criticised the "trial and error" progression and frustrating distances between save points. Jeff Marchiafava of Game Informer stated similar pros, but criticised the voice acting and dialogue.

The visuals and atmosphere were praised. Polygon editor Arthur Gies felt that Alien: Isolation is "a beautiful game, full of deep shadows and mystery around every corner", while Dan Whitehead of Eurogamer praised the lighting and unusually compelling environment design. IGN's Ryan McCaffrey gave high marks to the retro-futuristic art direction and sound design, writing: "From wisps of smoke that billow out of air vents to clouds of white mist that obscure your vision when you rewire an area's life-support systems in order to aid your stealthy objectives, Isolation certainly looks and sounds like a part of the Alien universe." Similarly, PC Gamer said that the art design sets Alien: Isolation apart from the likes of System Shock or Dead Space and creates a "convincing science-fiction world, with machines and environments that are functional and utilitarian, rather than overtly futuristic".

The characters were criticised; Game Informer stated that "Amanda exhibits little growth or personality, other than concern for her fellow humans and a desire not to die gruesomely", while Blake Peterson of GameRevolution noted that none of the characters are fully developed. According to him, "we never spend enough time with them to build the emotional bond necessary for their inevitable deaths to mean anything". GameTrailers said that most of the computer terminals contain unoriginal logs to describe predictable events, but also remarked that reading reports from different computer terminals "grounds Sevastopol in an appreciable way".

Writing for GamesRadar, David Houghton praised the Alien's advanced artificial intelligence, stating that "progress becomes a case of 'if' and 'how', not 'when'. Movement is measured in inches and feet rather than metres, and simply remaining alive becomes more exhilarating than any objective achieved." Peterson praised the gameplay as tense, scary and effective, writing that Alien: Isolation is "a solid, incredibly striking example of the [survival horror] genre that uses its first person perspective to greater personalize the horror". PC Gamer credited the crafting system for creating "a lot of unexpected depth", allowing players to outsmart enemies in multiple ways. The Survivor Mode was praised by Chris Carter of Destructoid, who felt that it offered players different feelings and experiences each time they played it.

Although the gameplay was praised by several reviewers, some found Isolation unnecessarily long, repetitive, and unforgiving. In a mixed review, McCaffrey felt that it did not offer many options of survival, requiring players to spend most of their time hiding in lockers "staring at the motion tracker". Polygon criticised the overexposure to the Alien, turning Alien: Isolation into an irritating experience. As Gies explained: "Every time I thought I heard the monster, every blip on my motion tracker, was a cause for a tightness in my chest at first. By the 300th time I dived under a table or into a locker, I wasn't scared anymore — I was annoyed." Despite the criticism, Alien: Isolation was considered "brave" by IGN due to its difficult gameplay, a feature that is uncommon in games with large development costs.

=== Accolades ===
Alien: Isolation received year-end awards including PC Gamer's Game of the Year 2014, Audio Achievement at the 11th British Academy Games Awards, Best Audio at the 15th Game Developers Choice Awards, and four awards at the 14th National Academy of Video Game Trade Reviewers. It was named the best game of 2014 by The Daily Telegraph, second-best by Empire and Time, and fourth by The Guardian. The Daily Mirror named it one of the 10 best games of 2014, and Eurogamer readers voted it the third-best. In 2015, Kotaku named Alien: Isolation the sixth-best horror game, and in 2018 The A.V. Club ranked it the fifth-best and GamesRadar+ ranked it the third-best. GamesRadar, Game Informer, GamesTM, Gaming Bolt, Sports Illustrated and USA Today named Alien: Isolation one of the best video games ever made. (Note: Multiple references:)

List of awards and nominations

Year	Award	Category	Recipient	Result	Ref.
2014	The PC Gamer 2014 Game of the Year Awards	Game of the Year	Alien: Isolation	Won	
2014	GamesRadar's Game of the Year 2014 Awards	Best Horror Game	Alien: Isolation	Won	
2014	Rock, Paper, Shotgun's Bestest Best Games of 2014	Best Horror Game	Alien: Isolation	Won	
2014	New Statesman's The Games of the Year 2014	The Best Game	Alien: Isolation	Won	
2014	Giant Bomb's 2014 Game of the Year Awards	Best Horror Game	Alien: Isolation	Runner-Up	
2014	The Game Awards 2014	Best Action/Adventure	Alien: Isolation	Nominated	
2014	The Game Awards 2014	Best Score/Soundtrack	Alien: Isolation	Nominated	
2014	Kotaku Australia Awards 2014	Console Game of the Year	Alien: Isolation	Won	
2014	Kotaku Australia Awards 2014	Overall Game of the Year	Alien: Isolation	Won	
2014	Kotaku Australia Awards 2014	Biggest Surprise of the Year	Alien: Isolation	Won	
2015	11th British Academy Games Awards	Best Game	Alien: Isolation	Nominated	
2015	11th British Academy Games Awards	British Game	Alien: Isolation	Nominated	
2015	11th British Academy Games Awards	Game Design	Alien: Isolation	Nominated	
2015	11th British Academy Games Awards	Game Innovation	Alien: Isolation	Nominated	
2015	11th British Academy Games Awards	Audio Achievement	Alien: Isolation	Won	
2015	11th British Academy Games Awards	Music	Alien: Isolation	Nominated	
2015	15th Game Developers Choice Awards	Game of the Year	Alien: Isolation	Nominated	
2015	15th Game Developers Choice Awards	Best Audio	Alien: Isolation	Won	
2015	15th Game Developers Choice Awards	Best Visual Arts	Alien: Isolation	Nominated	
2015	14th National Academy of Video Game Trade Reviewers awards	Game Engineering	Alien: Isolation	Won	
2015	14th National Academy of Video Game Trade Reviewers awards	Lighting/Texturing	Alien: Isolation	Won	
2015	14th National Academy of Video Game Trade Reviewers awards	Sound Effects	Alien: Isolation	Won	
2015	14th National Academy of Video Game Trade Reviewers awards	Use of Sound, Franchise	Alien: Isolation	Won	
2015	13th Visual Effects Society Awards	Outstanding Real-Time Visuals in a Video Game	Jude Bond, Al Hope, Howard Rayner, Oriol Sans Gomez	Nominated	

== Future ==
=== Sequel ===
In 2014, lead game designer Gary Napper said the team often discussed ideas for a sequel. Creative Assembly studio director Tim Heaton said in 2015 that a sequel was "not out of the question", but questioned whether Sega would fund another expensive AAA project after Isolation sold about 2.1 million copies without becoming a major commercial breakout. In 2017, Eurogamer reported that rumours of Alien: Isolation 2 being in development were incorrect and that most of the original game's design team had left Creative Assembly.

On 7 October 2024, the tenth anniversary of the game's release, Creative Assembly announced that a sequel was in early development. In April 2026, Sega released a teaser trailer titled "False Sense of Security". The game, titled Alien: Isolation 2, was formally revealed at Summer Game Fest in June 2026 for Nintendo Switch 2, PlayStation 5, Windows, and Xbox Series X and Series S.

=== Other media ===
Two comic book sequels, Aliens: Resistance and Aliens: Rescue, were released in 2019. A spin-off developed by D3 Go, Alien: Blackout, was released for mobile devices on 24 January 2019. It was shut down on 31 October 2023. In 2016, a pinball video game adaptation, Aliens vs. Pinball, was released for the Zen Pinball 2 and Pinball FX 2 video games developed by Zen Studios. A novelisation by Keith DeCandido, and a streaming television series adaptation by Jeff Juhasz and Fabien Dubois, were released in 2019. Alien: Romulus (2024) includes several elements from the game. (Note: Multiple references:) In the expansion pack Cyberpunk 2077: Phantom Liberty (2023), the mission titled Somewhat Damaged draws inspiration from Isolation.
