= Hudson (Aliens) =

Fictional character in Alien franchise

William Hudson
- Alien character
- Bill Paxton as Pvt Hudson in Aliens
- First appearance: Aliens (1986)
- Last appearance: Aliens: Colonial Marines (2013; corpse only)
- Created by: James Cameron
- Portrayed by: Bill Paxton

In-universe information
- Gender: Male
- Occupation: United States Colonial Marines Private First Class

Private First Class William L. Hudson is a fictional character in the 1986 science fiction film Aliens, played by actor Bill Paxton. Hudson is a member of the United States Colonial Marines deployed to the planet LV-426 to investigate the loss of communication with a terraforming colony, only to discover that the colony has been overcome with Xenomorphs. The character has become a fan favourite in the Alien franchise, and has been noted as one of Bill Paxton's most iconic and notable roles. The character's quote "Game over, man!" has been referenced numerous times in popular culture, and the character has been paid tribute to following Paxton's death in 2017.

== Fictional character biography ==
In Aliens Private First Class William Hudson (PFC W. L. Hudson A08/TQ1.0.41776E3) is a member of the United States Colonial Marines deployed on the Sulaco to LV-426 to investigate loss of contact with a terraforming colony. He is armed with an M41A pulse rifle and demonstrates skill with electronics by hacking a lock with a pocket computer and locating the lost colonists by targeting their locator beacons.

Though initially a braggart, Hudson's confidence turns to panic when most of his fellow marines are killed by Aliens during the mission. After the team's dropship is destroyed, he exclaims, "That's it, man! Game over, man! Game over! What the fuck are we gonna do now? What are we gonna do?" Hudson does eventually achieve some redemption after being scolded by Ripley. He regains his composure, and finds the courage to contribute to defending the team from the aliens.

Hudson is later dragged through a floor grating by the Aliens and disappears. The atmosphere processor on LV-426 explodes later in the film, wiping out the Aliens and the rest of the colony and leaving Hudson presumed dead along with the rest of the Marines. Only the characters Ripley, Newt, Bishop, and Corporal Hicks escape the planetoid alive.

== Production ==
Bill Paxton went through basic Marine training to prepare for his role, along with the rest of the actors portraying the Marines (with the exception of Michael Biehn, who was a last-minute replacement to the cast). The actors were allowed to personalize the armor they would wear in the film by decorating as they saw fit. Paxton added the phrase "Contents under pressure... do not puncture" and a reference to his fiancée (later wife), Louise Newbury, to his armor. Producer Gale Anne Hurd stated after Paxton's death "[James Cameron] wrote the role of Hudson specifically for [Paxton]. And there was no question of just how amazing Bill would be in the role. Things like 'Game over, man!' - all of that was their collaboration in creating a character who was the voice of the audience." Bill Paxton claimed to have improvised many of his lines, including the famous "Game over, man!" line. Paxton has also stated in the past that the constant high energy nature of Hudson made him a more difficult character to play, and has cited that Hudson was one of the most difficult roles he faced over his career. A conversation between Ripley and Hudson in the film has been used as analysis for how human beings often demean the heightened intelligence levels of non-human beings. The conversation in question is Hudson's response to the Xenomorphs cutting the power, with Hudson retorting "What do you mean they cut the power? How could they cut the power, man? They're animals!"

=== Alien 5 ===
Paxton was slated to have returned as Hudson for South African director Neill Blomkamp's sequel film to Aliens titled, "Alien 5", alongside Sigourney Weaver returning as Ellen Ripley and Michael Biehn returning as Corporal Dwayne Hicks. However, the project never picked up traction due to Ridley Scott's ongoing Alien prequel films Prometheus and Alien: Covenant. Due to Paxton's death in 2017, it is unlikely the character would return should the project be greenlit.

== Reception ==
Paxton's portrayal of Hudson in Aliens was well received by audiences and critics. The role would go on to become one of Bill Paxton's most iconic and notable roles in his filmography. After Paxton's death in 2017, his co-stars gathered in remembrance of him on April 26, also known as Alien Day (due to the date being aligned with the planet LV-426 from Aliens). Producer Gale Anne Hurd stated that "[Paxton] made going to work fun”. Actress Carrie Henn, who portrayed Newt in the film, stated that Paxton would often hang out with her in between takes to make her more comfortable. Paxton won the Saturn Award for Best Supporting Actor for his performance.

=== In popular culture ===
Hudson's line of "Game Over, Man!" has been parodied in later works of science fiction and popular culture such as Aladdin and the King of Thieves, Family Guy, Halo: Combat Evolved, Robot Chicken and TimeSplitters: Future Perfect.

In Fallout: New Vegas, if the player has the "Wild Wasteland" perk, a character can be heard quoting Hudson during the game's final mission.

In April 2026, online horror game Dead by Daylight introduced Hudson as a playable character, joining previously added Alien characters such as Ellen Ripley, the Xenomorph and Rain Carradine. "Game Over, Man!" also features as an occasional menu voice line said by Hudson.
