= Aliens: A Comic Book Adventure =

1995 video game

- Developer: Cryo Interactive
- Publisher: Mindscape
- Producers: David Locke; Jean-Martial Lefranc; Steve Hutchins
- Designers: Olivier Venet; Olivier Train; Cyrille Thomas
- Programmer: Nicolas Choukroun
- Artist: Bernard Bittler
- Platform: MS-DOS
- Release: May 25, 1995
- Genre: Adventure
- Mode: Single-player

Aliens: A Comic Book Adventure is a 1995 adventure game developed by Cryo Interactive Entertainment and published by Mindscape for MS-DOS. It is loosely based on the Aliens comic book series with many references to the graphic novel Labyrinth.

== Plot ==
Players take on the role of Lt. Col. Henry Hericksen, an ex-Colonial Marine aboard the USS Sheridan who is now the commander of a three-man terraforming team tasked with investigating a distress call originating from a remote outpost known as B54C. Players must search through a mining complex for clues.

The main protagonist, Lt. Col. Henricksen, is a nod to famed sci-fi actor Lance Henriksen, who played the android Bishop in Aliens and Alien³, and Charles Bishop Weyland in Alien vs. Predator. Towards the end of the game, players encounter a "Space Jockey" like huge dead creature found in the spaceship in the first Alien movie.

== Development and release ==
In 1994, Cryo Interactive were instructed to create an adventure game based on the Aliens comic book series being published by Dark Horse Comics at the time, with Mindscape acting as the game's publisher.

The U.S. version of the game was completed in October 1994 and released to manufacturing, of which an initial 120,000 units were produced. In December 1994 Fox disputed that Dark Horse possessed adequate contractual rights to allow sub-licensing of the property to Cryo and Mindscape for a videogame. This caused a delay in the game's release, with Fox eventually relenting and allowing Mindscape to sell only the existing stock, disallowing any further manufacturing or marketing.

== Reception ==
Upon its release, the game received mixed to mostly negative reviews. PC Gamer concluded: "A troubled and disappointing adventure for only the most patient gamer." Joystick said: "The most beautiful adventure game in the world is also one of the most interesting and has a fairly long lifespan."

In a retrospective article, Alexa Ray Corriea and Danielle Riendeau of Polygon wrote Aliens: A Comic Book Adventure "not only made the Aliens feel scary, but added a little more to the franchise by spinning different plot threads through the game." According to Pete Worth of Thunderbolt, "The game featured some high-end graphics and a certain degree of tension but the inventory-based puzzles and grid-based combat were often tedious. Still, it was interesting to see xenomorphs regain their fear-inducing deadliness after being reduced to mere cannon-fodder so often in other games."

On the other hand, Stephen Cleckner of GamesBeat opined "Aliens: The Comic Book Adventure is a frustratingly plodding and tedious excuse of a game." He recommended to "sit through a Let's Play video if you need to experience this thing. For your sake, don't actually try to play it." In 1996, Computer Gaming World ranked it as the #24 Worst Game of All Time as "bad art, plot and action shame the Dark Horse comic series on which it was based."
