= Aliens Infestation =

2011 video game

Aliens: Infestation
- Developer: WayForward Technologies
- Publisher: Sega
- Director: Adam Tierney
- Producer: Brian Burleson
- Designers: Adam Tierney; Cole Phillips
- Programmer: David Wright
- Artist: Marc Gomez
- Writers: Adam Tierney; Cole Phillips; Jeff Pomegranate
- Series: Alien
- Platform: Nintendo DS
- Release: AU: September 29, 2011; EU: September 30, 2011; NA: October 11, 2011
- Genre: Metroidvania
- Mode: Single-player

Aliens: Infestation is a 2011 Metroidvania video game developed by WayForward Technologies and published by Sega for the Nintendo DS handheld console. It is a tie-in to the Alien franchise. The cover art as well as the character designs and avatars were drawn by comic book artist Chris Bachalo.

The game received generally positive reviews, with many calling it a successful callback to the original Alien series and an improvement over the previous games, with particular praise towards the atmosphere, graphics and art design.

== Gameplay ==
Gameplay of Aliens: Infestation is comparable to the Metroid video games, where players are encouraged to search and backtrack for weapons, upgrades, and keys. The player controls one of a party of four marines and explores the U.S.S. Sulaco as well as LV-426 and Phobos in order to investigate the Union of Progressive Peoples (UPP) and Weyland-Yutani's involvement in Xenomorph development. The game incorporates a permadeath mechanic. If a marine falls in battle, another in the party will take their place. The player loses if the entire party is wiped out. Fallen characters can be replaced with any of fifteen displaced marines found throughout the game, each with their own unique dialogue.

== Plot ==
The USS Sephora has discovered the USS Sulaco adrift in space after the events of Aliens and Alien 3. The Colonial Marines are sent aboard the Sulaco to investigate and recover the life form detected aboard the ship.

== Development ==
Aliens: Infestation was developed simultaneously with Aliens: Colonial Marines, releasing ahead of Marines' completion. Because Gearbox Software was busy developing Colonial Marines for PC and home consoles, they chose to delegate the development of a Nintendo DS tie-in to another studio. Gearbox chose to contact WayForward because of the latter company's experience in developing the science-fiction action game Contra 4. Gearbox, Sega, and 20th Century Fox accepted WayForward's initial concept for the game.

When doing their research, game director Adam Tierney focused heavily on Ridley Scott's Alien and James Cameron's Aliens as inspiration. WayForward hired comic book artist Chris Bachalo to design and illustrate the game's characters; some of Bachalo's temporary names for these characters remain in the final game. To capture the films' slasher appeal, while still keeping the player emotionally invested, the development team created 20 unique characters, with the game's dialogue re-written 20 times, to make sure it offered the biggest 'gut-punch' when one dies. In conjunction with the game's 'party of four' mechanic, the developers wanted players to grow attached to their favorites, which, in-turn, increased the likelihood of getting one killed. The game's difficulty was balanced so that the player would lose unique characters at roughly the same rate they are introduced.

The gameplay of Aliens: Infestation was inspired by Metroidvania games such as Super Metroid and Castlevania: Symphony of the Night, along with first-person shooters such as Tom Clancy's Rainbow Six Vegas and Call of Duty 4: Modern Warfare. This resulted in gameplay similar to a Metroidvania but with FPS elements such as manual reloading and taking cover. According to Tierney, the most difficult part of development was the creation of the titular xenomorphs, which were to behave like the creatures in the films but simultaneously function as video game enemies. The team chose to include various forms of Alien based on their appearances in different films.

== Reception ==
Reception

Aggregate score
Aggregator	Score
Metacritic	76/100

Review scores
Publication	Score
The A.V. Club	B+
Destructoid	8.5/10
Eurogamer	8/10
Game Informer	8.25/10
GamePro	3.5/5
GameRevolution	B
GameSpot	8/10
GameTrailers	7.7/10
IGN	8/10
Joystiq	4/5
Nintendo Power	8/10
The Digital Fix	7/10
Digital Spy	4/5

Aliens: Infestation received "generally favorable reviews" according to the review aggregation website Metacritic.

Digital Spy gave it four stars out of five, saying, "In many ways, it feels like the Aliens game we should have been given back in the 16-bit era when the movie series was still relatively new. Whether it has been worth the wait is debatable, but this is certainly a worthy addition to the DS library." However, The Digital Fix gave it seven out of ten, saying that "It can be uneven at times in terms of quality but it is highly enjoyable, especially if you are fan of either the franchise or even if you are just a fan of 'Metroidvania' games."
