= Dwayne Hicks =

Fictional character in Alien franchise

- Alien character
- Michael Biehn as Corporal Dwayne Hicks in Aliens
- First appearance: Aliens (1986)
- Last appearance: Aliens: Colonial Marines (2013)
- Created by: James Cameron
- Portrayed by: Michael Biehn; James Remar (initial production)

In-universe information
- Gender: Male
- Occupation: Senior corporal

Corporal Dwayne Hicks, also known mononymously as Hicks, is a fictional character in the Alien franchise. First appearing in the film Aliens, he was portrayed by actor Michael Biehn. The character is a Senior Corporal of the United States Colonial Marine Corps aboard the USS Sulaco and is one of only four survivors of the Sulaco crew's expedition to LV-426, along with Ellen Ripley, Rebecca "Newt" Jorden, and the android Bishop. Hicks was initially killed during the introduction of the film's sequel Alien 3, a decision that garnered negative backlash from fans of the franchise. Hicks was later rewritten to have survived, as he returns as the main protagonist of the "Stasis Interrupted" DLC in the videogame Aliens: Colonial Marines and as a side character in the game's main story.

== Fictional character biography ==
=== Aliens ===
Corporal Dwayne Hicks and his unit were selected by Lieutenant Gorman (William Hope) to be dispatched on a mission to the planet of LV-426, accompanied by Weyland-Yutani Corporation representative, Carter Burke (Paul Reiser) and the sole survivor of the USCSS Nostromo, Ellen Ripley (Sigourney Weaver). As with the rest of his crew, Hicks believed that the mission was a waste of time, and Ripley's belief that there were alien lifeforms on the planet was nonsensical and they were only going to uncover a communications breakdown at the colony of Hadley's Hope. Eventually, the group discovers a lab with contained "Facehuggers", holes in the floors from the Xenomorph's acid blood, and a young girl hiding from the creatures named Newt (Carrie Henn). The marines descend further into the colony, where they find the Xenomorph's hive. One of the colonists gave birth to a "Chestburster", which was set ablaze by Sergeant Apone (Al Matthews), which woke the aliens and attacked the marines. As the marine squadron was being massacred by the aliens, Hicks, along with Privates Hudson (Bill Paxton) and Vasquez (Jenette Goldstein) were able to escape back to the APC with Newt.

With Apone deceased, and Gorman unresponsive, Hicks automatically assumed command of the ragtag survivors, Ripley, Hudson, Vasquez, Newt, Burke, Gorman and android Bishop (Lance Henriksen). Ripley and Hicks devise a plan to decimate the complex with a nuclear strike from orbit to successfully ensure all Xenomorphs were eradicated. Before the survivors could be escorted back to the Sulaco to safety, a Xenomorph killed pilot Corporal Ferro (Colette Hiller), and crashed their aircraft into the APC. The group scavenge the wreckage for salvageable equipment, and retreat to the Operations Center to regroup with Bishop. They fortify the area by sealing access points and deploying sentry guns at key locations. Bishop then reveals to the group that Atmosphere Processor had been damaged in battle, and would explode in several hours, and that the dropship crash had destroyed the systems that would stop this from happening. In response to this, Hicks formulated a plan that would involve Bishop remotely piloting the second dropship aboard the Sulaco to the surface from the colony transmitter. During this, Hicks instructed Ripley how to use the M41A Pulse Rifle for self-defense. Hicks later responds to a fire alarm that had been set off in the medical lab, only to discover that Ripley and Newt were trapped inside with two live Facehuggers. Hicks rescues Ripley and Newt, and discovers that Burke had intended to smuggle the Xenomorph specimens back to Earth by impregnating Ripley and Newt. Hicks wanted to execute Burke for his treachery, but is stopped by Ripley who demands he face justice for his crimes back on Earth. During this confrontation, the Xenomorphs cut the power to the building and launched an assault on the group.

The ensuing battle claimed the lives of Hudson and Burke, causing the remaining survivors to escape through the colony's ventilation ducts, where Vasquez and Gorman are cornered by Xenomorphs and sacrifice their lives by detonating a hand grenade to avoid being captured and impregnated. The blast caused Newt to fall down a separate shaft, where, despite the best efforts of Ripley and Hicks to save her, she is captured by a Xenomorph. As they attempt to escape, Ripley and Hicks are cornered by a Xenomorph in an elevator, whose acid blood severely burns Hicks' face and begins to melt through his chest armor. Ripley and Hicks make it to the dropship, where Hicks is sedated by Bishop, and encourages Ripley to save Newt, revealing to her his first name and asking her to hurry back before he falls unconscious. Once Ripley returns with Newt and successfully defeats the Queen Xenomorph aboard the Sulaco, Hicks is placed in cryosleep for the return trip to Earth.

=== Alien 3 ===
In the start of Alien 3, an alien egg hatches aboard the Sulaco, with a facehugger attaching itself to Ripley. It injures itself trying to get into her cryotube, with its acidic blood starting a fire in the sub flooring. This causes the cryogenic pods to be ejected into the ocean of Fiorina 161. The crash results in Newt being drowned in her Cryotube, Hicks being impaled and crushed by a support beam and Bishop being damaged further, leaving Ripley as the sole survivor once again. Hicks and Newt's bodies are cremated and Bishop is later switched off after reporting the ship's log and after asking Ripley to put him out of his misery.

=== Aliens: Colonial Marines ===
In the game Aliens: Colonial Marines, it is revealed that Hicks attempted to send a distress call before entering cryosleep, but the message was blocked by Weyland-Yutani and was never transmitted. Hicks was awoken from his hypersleep by colonists Samuel Stone and Turk due to an emergency seeking military aid. A firefight between the Weyland-Yutani corporation and the colonists ensued, which caused a bullet to graze the Facehugger attached to Ripley, causing the acid blood to start an electrical fire. In the scuffle, Turk was knocked into Hicks' open cryotube, and became the casualty witnessed in Alien 3, retconning Hicks' death. Hicks and Stone travelled through the Sulaco, killing whatever Weyland-Yutani PMCs and Xenomorphs they came across before boarding a skiff to the planet Fiorina 161. Hicks and Stone would later observe Ripley sacrificing her life to prevent The company from obtaining the Queen Chestburster she was incubating. Hicks's despair caused the two of them to be located and captured by Michael Bishop.

Hicks and Stone were taken to a Weyland-Yutani ship called The Resolute where they were interrogated for information, which resulted in Stone being executed for failing to comply. Hicks was freed by researcher Rick Levy and the two fought through the ship to transmit Hicks's distress call in the midst of a Xenomorph outbreak. Bishop destroyed the uplink before the transmission could be completed, but the incomplete transmission caught the attention of the USCM, who had sent a squadron to Hadley's Hope. Hicks would later be rescued by the squadron aboard the USS Sephora. The Sephora crew, along with Hicks, confronted Michael Bishop, which resulted in Hicks executing him, revealing that he was simply another android double.

== Production ==
=== Casting ===
Before Biehn was cast, actor James Remar was cast in the role of Hicks, and filmed for two weeks. At the time, Remar was a struggling drug addict and was arrested for possession of illicit substances. The actor's arrest and drug problems prompted James Cameron to fire Remar and hastily cast Biehn. Due to his late casting, Biehn was unable to customize his character's combat armor as the other actors had done. Biehn rejected the padlock heart motif that he was given, joking that it was like a giant bullseye on his chest. Remar still appears briefly in the finished product in a wide shot in the Xenomorph hive. However, the actor's back is facing the camera, making it near impossible to tell the difference between the two actors. Actor Stephen Lang also auditioned for the role but he did not get it, however James Cameron remembered Lang and cast him in his 2009 film Avatar.

=== Alien 3 controversy ===
In William Gibson's initial script for Alien 3, Hicks and Bishop were to become the new main protagonists of the series and were to be deployed onto a space station, with the script ending with a cliffhanger setting up the next installment to take place on Earth. This script was later rejected. While Biehn didn't have a problem with Hicks being killed off, he did object to the character being killed off at the start of the film. Biehn was of the belief that Hicks should have appeared alongside Ripley, to further develop the relationship between the two of them, before being killed. Biehn would later file a lawsuit against 20th Century Fox for the unauthorised use of his likeness in the film. Aliens director James Cameron has gone on record citing his dislike for the treatment of Hicks, Newt and Bishop in Alien 3.

=== Neill Blomkamp's Alien 5 ===
Hicks was set to return in director Neill Blomkamp's Aliens sequel project titled Alien 5. Biehn was set to reprise the role alongside Sigourney Weaver returning as Ripley. However, the project went through development hell due to Ridley Scott's continued prequel films Prometheus and Alien: Covenant. The project was later cancelled after the Disney-Fox merger.

=== Alternate sequels ===
Before production began on Alien³, Dark Horse Comics produced a comic book series that follows-up on the characters after Aliens. In that series, Hicks, Newt and Bishop all survive the escape from the Sulaco with Ripley and continue to fight the Xenomorphs. With the release of Alien³, this comic books series was considered an alternate universe from "official" Alien series canon and when the series was redone for release (the black and white art was coloured and characters reworked) and the Hicks character was renamed to Wilks (with one missed panel still referring to him as Hicks the only reminder of the original text).

The story begins ten years after Aliens, with Newt and Hicks back on Earth. Ripley has mysteriously disappeared and was not on the Marine ship when it arrived back on Earth. Hicks is still in the Marines, but his fellow Marines shun him because they fear he might have some sort of strange alien infection, and the fact that half of his face has hideously scarred by a Xenomorph's acid blood only hampers his social status further.

=== Similarity to other characters ===
Michael Biehn's portrayal of Corporal Hicks is similar to his portrayal of the character Kyle Reese in the movie The Terminator. Both Aliens and The Terminator were directed by James Cameron and in both movies Michael Biehn plays sympathetic but heroic military men that bond with the strong female protagonists.

== Reception ==
The portrayal of Hicks by Michael Biehn was acclaimed by fans and critics alike for the character's intuition, strategic way of thinking, and the chemistry between Biehn and Sigourney Weaver. Hicks quickly became a fan favourite character in the franchise and one of the more recognisable characters. The character's death in Alien 3 was seen as being disrespectful and unsatisfying by fans of the franchise, who have since waited for the character to return to the franchise. The character has also gone on to become arguably Michael Biehn's most iconic and notable performance of his career, alongside Kyle Reese. Due to the backlash from the character's death, Biehn has reprised his role in the sequel videogame Aliens: Colonial Marines, which retcons his death and established Hicks as the true last survivor of the USS Sulaco. Biehn also reprised his role for the audio drama of William Gibson's unused Alien 3 script alongside Lance Henriksen returning as Bishop.

=== Accolades ===
In 1987, Michael Biehn was nominated for Best Actor at the Saturn Awards by the Academy of Science Fiction, Fantasy & Horror Films for his performance as Corporal Hicks in Aliens. The award ultimately went to Jeff Goldblum for his performance as Seth Brundle in The Fly.

Award	Subject	Nominee	Result
Saturn Award	Best Actor	Michael Biehn	Nominated
