= Bishop (Aliens) =

Fictional character in the Alien franchise

- Alien character
- Lance Henriksen as Bishop in Aliens (1986)
- First appearance: Aliens (1986)
- Last appearance: Bishop (2023)
- Created by: James Cameron
- Portrayed by: Lance Henriksen

In-universe information
- Species: Android
- Occupation: Science officer

Bishop, designated HS17B48XG5-D5, is a fictional character portrayed by Lance Henriksen in the science fiction film Aliens (1986). He is an android and the science officer of the Sulaco. Despite struggling to gain the trust of protagonist Ellen Ripley, who was traumatized when the android Ash betrayed her in the previous film, Bishop's actions and self-sacrifice ultimately enable her to survive.

== Fictional biography ==
=== Aliens ===
Bishop (played by Lance Henriksen), the android executive officer assigned to the Sulaco, is primarily responsible for planetary maneuvering. When he introduces himself to Ripley, he says that his programming demands complete loyalty (unlike Ash); Ripley is initially distrustful. After most of the Colonial Marines are wiped out by the Aliens on LV-426, Bishop is a medic and technician who ensures that the company's dropship receives Ripley, Newt and Hicks. When he boards the Sulaco, he is impaled and bisected by the stowaway Alien queen. When Ripley defeats the queen by opening the airlock, Bishop saves Newt. He is placed into cryosleep with Ripley, Newt and Hicks.

=== Alien 3 ===
When the Sulaco crashes into Fury 161 in Alien 3, Bishop is damaged beyond repair and thrown into the prison's landfill. Ripley later reactivates Bishop in order to access the black box recorder of the Sulaco, learning from him that there had been a xenomorph aboard the Sulaco, that it was now on the planet with them, and that this information had been transmitted directly to Weyland-Yutani. After giving Ripley the information she wanted, Bishop asked to be disconnected, stating that while he could be repaired, he would never be the top of the line android he once was; Ripley obliged him. His remains were later retrieved by the Weyland-Yutani Bio-Weapons Division that arrived on the planet to capture Ripley and the xenomorph, headed by Bishop's designer, Michael Bishop Weyland.

=== Aliens: Bug Hunt ===
Bishop's origin is detailed in the 2017 short story "Broken" by Rachel Caine, featured in the anthology Aliens: Bug Hunt. It is revealed in the novel that Bishop was named after the chess piece, given that the fellow identical synthetics he meets are given names based on chess pieces.

Immediately after his activation, Bishop is quizzed by a technician named Dr. Sasaki to ensure he does not suffer from any potentially dangerous faults in his character programming. Sasaki releases Bishop into a room containing other similar androids, although she privately voices her concern that he may be flawed, possessing emotional capabilities exceeding his intended capacity, like that of the decommissioned "David" line. Noting the reactions of people around him to his unorthodox responses, Bishop decides that he is simply "different".

Sometime later, Bishop is attached to a Colonial Marine unit led by Lieutenant Lew "Lucky" Larsen, currently attempting to free a group of hostages on Haarsa Colony. Following a firefight with the hostage-takers, a group of predominantly ex-military criminals known as Company F, Larsen orders Bishop to check the wounded and tag those able to be evacuated, explaining that their orders are to destroy the colony's air converters and abandon the remaining hostages. Realising the destruction of the converters will flood the facility with deadly Pervox gas, Bishop questions his orders, but is overruled.

After tagging the wounded, Bishop then elects to take gas masks to the hostages, ignoring Larsen's attempts to stop him. Upon reaching the rest of the Company F mercenaries, Bishop discovers they are equipped with another Bishop-model synthetic named Rook. As Bishop attempts to reason with the hostage-takers from cover, Rook ambushes him; Bishop easily beats him in hand-to-hand combat and destroys Rook's central processor with his own knife. Then, posing as Rook, he returns to the surviving Company F soldiers. At that moment the Marines destroy the converters with explosives, and poisonous gas spreads throughout the colony. As the mercenaries and hostages are overcome, Bishop places the gas masks he has brought along on the hostages, saving their lives.

Bishop begins ferrying the hostages to the dropship left for him on the landing pad, but when he returns for the final two he is shot by two Company F mercs, who survived in an air pocket long enough to steal gas masks from two of the hostages. As the two mercenaries mock the now partially paralyzed Bishop and knowing they will slaughter the other hostages before leaving, Bishop overcomes his programming that safeguards human life, remotely deactivating the men's gas masks, exposing them to the Pervox, killing them. As his last act, Bishop remotely pilots the dropship into orbit, saving the hostages, before shutting down.

When Bishop reactivates, he finds himself in a med bay being tended to by Private Hudson, under the watchful eye of Sergeant Apone. He learns from these Marines that they recovered him from Hearst Colony to replace their own synthetic, lost in action several missions previously. As they acquaint themselves with their new team member, Hudson teaches Bishop the knife game.

== Production ==
Henriksen was one of several actors, including Michael Biehn and Bill Paxton, cast in Aliens who had collaborated with James Cameron on The Terminator. Roz Kaveney, in her analysis of Ash in From Alien to The Matrix: Reading Science Fiction Film, draws parallels to Bishop as a representation of the Three Laws of Robotics. Although Ash's programming allows (and encourages) harming humans, Bishop puts human life above all else in accordance with the First Law of Robotics. Bishop was studied by LeiLani Nishime of the University of Texas Press in 2005 as a theoretical dramatization of how humans would deal with the presence of an Other concerning Ripley's initial apprehension about being near a synthetic after her life-threatening encounter with Ash. According to an article by Anton Karl Kozlovic of the University of Nebraska Omaha, Bishop's altruistic actions (which include rescuing Newt and Ripley) contradict a trend towards technophobia in pre-1990 films.

In Cameron's original treatment for Aliens, Bishop never actually sets foot on LV-426 and remains aboard the Sulaco in orbit. He also refuses to rescue the survivors at the end of the story, saying that his programming will not allow him to risk the xenomorphs potentially contaminating the ship and subsequently spreading throughout the human race. In William Gibson's unproduced script for Alien 3, Bishop and Hicks became the series' main characters in lieu of Ripley, and they, along with another group of Colonial Marines, are involved in a xenomorph outbreak on a massive space station, where the Aliens are being bred and studied for use as a bio-weapon. The screenplay ended with a cliffhanger setting up a fourth movie that would take place on Earth. The script was eventually rejected, although it is widely available to read online. In 2019, Gibson’s script was adapted into an audio drama by Audible, with both Michael Biehn and Lance Henriksen reprising their roles.

To create the effect of Bishop performing the "knife trick" at inhuman speed, the footage of the scene was sped up. It has also been referenced within the wider Alien and Alien vs. Predator franchises themselves; Charles Bishop Weyland briefly uses a pen to do the game in the 2004 film Alien vs. Predator, the game appears as an unlockable minigame in the 2011 Nintendo DS video game Aliens: Infestation, and is featured the 2017 novel Aliens: Bug Hunt.

== Appearances ==
- Aliens (1986)
- Aliens (novel) (1986)
- Aliens Adventure Game (video game) (1991)
- Aliens: Space Marines (comic) (1992)
- Alien 3 (1992)
- Alien 3 (novel) (1992)
- Alien 3 (comic) (1992)
- Aliens: Earth Hive (novel) (1992) (reference)
- Aliens: Nightmare Asylum (novel) (1993) (reference)
- Aliens: The Female War (novel) (1993)
- Aliens: Colonial Marines Technical Manual (1995, 1996, 2012)
- Alien Trilogy (video game) (1996)
- Alien vs. Predator (2004) (reference)
- Aliens vs. Predator (2010) (reference)
- Aliens: Infestation (2011) (reference)
- Aliens: Colonial Marines (2013)
- Alien: River of Pain (novel) (2014)
- Alien: The Weyland-Yutani Report (2014)
- Aliens: Bug Hunt (novel) (2017)
- Aliens: Bishop (novel) (2023)
