= Alien (franchise) =

Science fiction horror and action franchise

- Official franchise logo
- Created by: Dan O'Bannon; Ronald Shusett
- Original work: Alien (1979)
- Owner: 20th Century Studios
- Years: 1979–present

Print publications
- Novels: List of novels
- Comics: List of comics

Films and television
- Films: Alien (1979); Aliens (1986); Alien 3 (1992); Alien Resurrection (1997); Prometheus (2012); Alien: Covenant (2017); Alien: Romulus (2024); Crossover films: Alien vs. Predator (2004); Aliens vs. Predator: Requiem (2007)
- Short films: Prometheus films: TED 2023 (2012); Quiet Eye: Elizabeth Shaw (2012); Alien 40th anniversary films: Alien: Containment (2019); Alien: Specimen (2019); Alien: Night Shift (2019); Alien: Ore (2019); Alien: Harvest (2019); Alien: Alone (2019)
- Television series: Alien: Earth (2025–present)
- Web series: Alien: Isolation – The Digital Series (2019)

Theatrical presentations
- Play: Alien: The Play (2019)

Games
- Video games: List of video games

Audio
- Soundtracks: Alien (1979); Aliens (1987); Alien 3 (1992); Alien Resurrection (1997); Alien vs. Predator (2004); Aliens vs. Predator: Requiem (2007); Prometheus (2012); Alien: Covenant (2017); Alien: Romulus (2024)

Miscellaneous
- Character(s): List of characters

Alien is an American science fiction horror and action media franchise created by screenwriters Dan O'Bannon and Ronald Shusett, which began as the 1979 film Alien. The series primarily follows deadly encounters between humans and the extraterrestrial Xenomorphs in the future.

Released as seven films distributed by 20th Century Studios (formerly 20th Century Fox) and produced by Brandywine Productions since 1979, the series has led to numerous novels, comics, and video games, and a 2025 television series created by Noah Hawley titled Alien: Earth. Sigourney Weaver starred as warrant officer Ellen Ripley in the first four films, Alien (1979), Aliens (1986), Alien 3 (1992), and Alien Resurrection (1997). The other three films follow different characters, and include prequels Prometheus (2012) and Alien: Covenant (2017), and Alien: Romulus (2024), which is set between the first two films. The films were directed by Ridley Scott, James Cameron, David Fincher, Jean-Pierre Jeunet, and Fede Álvarez.

The film series has also inspired a number of spin-offs—most notably the Alien vs. Predator series, which combines the continuities of the Alien franchise with the Predator franchise and consists of two films as well as various series of comics, books, and video games.

== Premise ==
Weyland-Yutani logo as it appears in Aliens (1986).

The Alien franchise depicts a series of deadly encounters, predominantly spanning the 22nd and 24th centuries, between humanity and the Xenomorph; a hostile, endoparasitoid, extraterrestrial species. Humanity is depicted as a space-faring species with an interstellar dominion; space journeys typically last months, even years, and require the use of cryosleep. Throughout the series, characters are repeatedly manipulated and endangered by the unscrupulous megacorporation Weyland-Yutani Corp, which seeks to profit from the Xenomorph.

The series fictionalizes the origin of the human race. A member of an ancient humanoid species called the Engineers sacrifices himself, allowing his DNA to spark the genesis of mankind. The Engineers' other experiments, designed to exterminate the human race through the means of a deadly mutagen, pave the way for the Xenomorphs to rise and populate through the traumatic implantation of larvae in hosts. Incidents across several generations are chronicled throughout the franchise.

== Background ==
Writer Dan O'Bannon, wanting to write a science-fiction action film, collaborated with screenwriter Ronald Shusett on a script, initially titled Star Beast, but eventually changed to Alien. Brandywine Productions, a company which had a distribution deal with 20th Century Fox, bought the script. The writers expected it to be a low-budget film, but the success of Star Wars inclined Fox to invest millions.

In the original script, the ship had an all-male crew, though it noted that all roles could be played by men or women without major changes to the film. The Ripley character was initially to be played by Tom Skerritt, but when Fox president Alan Ladd Jr. and the producers at Brandywine heard rumors of Fox working on other titles with strong female leads, it was decided to cast a female as Ripley (Sigourney Weaver) and Skerritt became Captain Dallas. Ridley Scott came on as director.

Swiss painter and sculptor H. R. Giger designed the alien creature's adult form and the derelict ship, while French artist Mœbius created the look of the spacesuits and Ron Cobb provided most of the industrial design for the sets.

While Alien was a critical and financial success upon its 1979 release, Fox did not consider a sequel until 1983. That year, James Cameron expressed his interest to producer David Giler in continuing the Alien story. After Cameron's The Terminator became a box office hit in 1984, Cameron and partner Gale Anne Hurd were given approval to direct and produce the sequel to Alien, scheduled for a 1986 release. Cameron wrote the screenplay for Aliens from a story he developed with Giler and Walter Hill.

Following the second film, Weaver was not interested in returning to the series, so Giler and Hill commissioned a sequel without the Ripley character. Fox's president Joe Roth opposed Ripley's removal, and Weaver was offered a $5 million salary and a producer credit to make Alien 3. Giler, Hill and Larry Ferguson wrote the screenplay, based on a story from an earlier script by Vincent Ward, intended to bring closure to the Alien franchise by killing off Ripley, the principal character. Alien 3 faced a mired production, with extensive script difficulties, trouble securing a director, production beginning prior to the completion of a final script, as well as profuse studio interference.

While fans and critics initially did not receive Alien 3 well, and director David Fincher disowned it, the film was a worldwide success and piqued Fox's interest in continuing the franchise. The Assembly Cut, which restored many of the scenes cut from the theatrical version, would later receive more positive reviews, with the film considered a cult classic in some quarters.

In 1996, production on the fourth Alien film, Alien Resurrection, began. Ripley was not in the script's first draft, and Weaver was not interested in reprising the role. She joined the project after being offered an $11 million salary and more creative control, including director approval. The script, set 200 years after Alien 3, resurrected the Ripley character via human cloning. The film, directed by Jean-Pierre Jeunet, experienced an extended production, and screenwriter Joss Whedon later said that he thought it had done "everything wrong" with his script. The film was released in 1997 to mixed reviews and modest box office returns. It has since gained fans for its camp style and dark humor.

Development of a prequel story began in the early 2000s when both Ridley Scott and James Cameron started to develop ideas for a story that would explore the origins of the Alien. In 2002, the development of Alien vs. Predator had taken precedence and the prequel project remained dormant until 2009. Jon Spaihts wrote the first screenplay for the project, but Scott then opted for a different direction and hired Damon Lindelof in 2010, to rewrite the script into a story that focused on the creators of the Aliens, rather than the Aliens themselves. The film, titled Prometheus, was released in 2012 to box office success grossing over $400 million worldwide, and received generally positive reviews.

By 2014, development on the second prequel was underway, with Scott returning as director. The film's screenplay was initially written by Jack Paglen in 2013, but was subsequently rewritten by Michael Green and Dante Harper, before Scott's collaborator from Gladiator, John Logan, wrote the final version. The film, titled Alien: Covenant, commenced production in February 2016 and was released on May 19, 2017. Alien: Covenant was a box office disappointment, grossing $240 million worldwide against a production budget of $97–111 million, while also receiving lukewarm critical reviews.

In March 2022, The Hollywood Reporter reported that Hulu would release a new Alien film, initially reported as a standalone entry in the franchise, to be directed by Fede Álvarez and produced by Ridley Scott. Álvarez had pitched the idea to Scott years prior. It was later clarified that the film was set between Alien and Aliens. Cailee Spaeny was announced to be in talks for the lead role from November of that year. Production on the film Alien: Romulus began in March 2023. It was released in theaters on August 16, 2024. It received positive reviews from critics, and was a box office success having grossed $350 million on a production budget of $80 million.

In October 2024, 20th Century Studios president Steve Asbell said, "We're working on a sequel idea now. We haven't quite closed our deal with Fede [Álvarez], but we are going to, and he has an idea that we're working on." By February 2025, Álvarez confirmed that he is currently writing the script for a sequel stating that it would be the next project on which he begins production, and principal photography tentatively scheduled for later that year. In June, Álvarez stated that pre-production for the sequel was underway, with filming slated to begin in October. In September, Álvarez confirmed he and co-writer Rodo Sayagues have completed a script but will not be returning as director for the sequel, opting instead to be a producer alongside Ridley Scott.

== Films ==
Film	U.S. release date	Director	Screenwriter(s)	Story by	Producer(s)
Main films
Alien	May 25, 1979	Ridley Scott	Dan O'Bannon	Dan O'Bannon & Ronald Shusett	Gordon Carroll, David Giler & Walter Hill
Aliens	July 18, 1986	James Cameron	James Cameron	James Cameron, David Giler & Walter Hill	Gale Anne Hurd
Alien 3	May 22, 1992	David Fincher	David Giler, Walter Hill & Larry Ferguson	Vincent Ward	Gordon Carroll, David Giler & Walter Hill
Alien Resurrection	November 26, 1997	Jean-Pierre Jeunet	Joss Whedon	Joss Whedon	Gordon Carroll, David Giler, Walter Hill & Bill Badalato
Prometheus	June 8, 2012	Ridley Scott	Jon Spaihts & Damon Lindelof	Jon Spaihts & Damon Lindelof	David Giler, Walter Hill & Ridley Scott
Alien: Covenant	May 19, 2017	Ridley Scott	John Logan & Dante Harper	Jack Paglen & Michael Green	David Giler, Walter Hill, Ridley Scott, Mark Huffam & Michael Schaefer
Alien: Romulus	August 16, 2024	Fede Álvarez	Fede Álvarez & Rodo Sayagues	Fede Álvarez & Rodo Sayagues	Ridley Scott, Michael Pruss & Walter Hill
Crossover films
Alien vs. Predator	August 13, 2004	Paul W. S. Anderson	Paul W. S. Anderson	Paul W. S. Anderson, Dan O'Bannon & Ronald Shusett	John Davis, Gordon Carroll, David Giler & Walter Hill
Aliens vs. Predator: Requiem	December 25, 2007	Greg & Colin Strause	Shane Salerno	Shane Salerno	John Davis, David Giler & Walter Hill

Alien story chronology
- 2023 — TED 2023 (2012)
- 2079 — Happy Birthday, David (2012)
- 2089 — Quiet Eye, Elizabeth Shaw (2012)
- 2091 — Project Prometheus: Mission (2012)
- 2092 — Weyland Industries Testimonial (2012)
- 2092 — Prometheus Transmission (2012)
- 2093 — Prometheus (2012)
- N/A — Alien: Covenant — Meet Walter (2017)
- 2094 — Alien: Covenant — Prologue: The Crossing (2017)
- 2104 — Alien: Covenant — Origins (2017)
- 2104 — Alien: Covenant — Phobos (2017)
- 2104 — Alien: Covenant — Prologue: Last Supper (2017)
- 2104 — Alien: Covenant — Crew Messages (2017)
- 2104 — Alien: Covenant — She Won't Go Quietly (2017)
- 2104 — Alien: Covenant (2017)
- 2104 — Alien: Covenant — Advent (2017)
- 2117 — Alien: Covenant — David's Lab: Last Signs of Life (2019)
- 2119 — Alien: Harvest (2019)
- 2120 — Alien: Earth (2025) (TV series)
- 2122 — Alien (1979)
- 2122 — Alien: Ore (2019)
- 2125 — Alien: Containment (2019)
- 2125 — Alien: Specimen (2019)
- 2125 — Alien: Alone (2019)
- 2137 — Alien: Isolation (2014)
- 2137 — Alien: Blackout (2019)
- 2142 — Alien: Romulus (2024)
- 2159 — Alien: Out of the Shadows (2014)
- 2179 — Aliens (1986)
- 2179 — Alien: Night Shift (2019)
- 2179 — Aliens: Colonial Marines (2013)
- 2179 — Alien 3 (1992)
- 2198 — Aliens: Dark Descent (2023)
- 2202 — Aliens: Fireteam Elite (2021)
- 2207 — Aliens: Fireteam Elite 2 (2026)
- 2381 — Alien Resurrection (1997)
- 2381 — Alien: Uncivil War (2024)

=== Main films ===
==== Alien (1979) ====
On its way back to Earth, the commercial towing vehicle Nostromo is diverted to a desolate planetoid by a cryptic signal from a derelict alien spacecraft. Inside the alien ship, the crew discovers thousands of egg-like objects. A creature, released from one of the eggs, attaches itself to a crewman's face, rendering him unconscious. The others break quarantine to return him to the Nostromo. The parasite dies and the crewman wakes up, seemingly unaffected. Soon afterwards, an alien organism bursts from his chest and grows rapidly into a large lethal creature, which the surviving crew attempt to kill. The Nostromo is destroyed in an unsuccessful attempt to kill the creature, leaving Ellen Ripley as the only survivor in the ship's lifeboat.

==== Aliens (1986) ====
After 57 years in hypersleep, Ripley awakens aboard a medical space station orbiting Earth. She recounts the events of the Nostromo but is disbelieved by her superiors in the Weyland-Yutani Corporation, which has now begun to terraform and colonise LV-426, the planetoid from the first film. When contact with the colony is lost, Ripley is persuaded to accompany a squad of marines to investigate. They discover the colonists have been wiped out after being directed by the company to secure the derelict ship reported by Ripley. There is only one survivor, a girl named Newt. The aliens vastly outnumber and quickly overwhelm the marines, who fight for survival. Only a handful, including Ripley and Newt, escape.

==== Alien 3 (1992) ====
Immediately following the events of Aliens, the military ship USS Sulaco, carrying the survivors, catches fire. The occupants are ejected in an escape pod, which crash-lands on the refinery/prison planet Fiorina "Fury" 161. All on board except Ripley are killed. An alien facehugger is also aboard, and impregnates an animal with an alien, which soon begins killing inmates and wardens. Ripley discovers an alien queen is growing inside her, and is determined to kill both herself and the creature before Weyland-Yutani can exploit them.

==== Alien Resurrection (1997) ====
Two hundred years after the events of Alien 3, several clones of Ripley, including the Alien queen she was carrying, are grown by the military aboard the USM Auriga. The military intends to exploit the Aliens, and uses humans kidnapped and delivered to them by a group of mercenaries as hosts for the queen's eggs. The Aliens escape, and Ripley 8 (a clone mixed with Alien DNA) and the mercenaries attempt to escape and destroy the Auriga before it reaches Earth.

==== Prometheus (2012) ====
In 2084, some 30 years before the events of Alien, scientists Elizabeth Shaw and Charlie Holloway discover a star map among the remnants of several ancient Earth cultures. Accompanied by android David 8 and hoping to discover the origins of humanity, they journey aboard the spaceship USCSS Prometheus and arrive in 2093 on the distant planet LV-223 in the Zeta^{2} Reticuli system, the same region of space in which the planetoid LV-426 from Alien is found. There they discover the ancient remains of an advanced civilization, called the Engineers (apparently the same race as the dead pilot from the derelict ship in Alien), who were developing biological weapons in the form of a pathogenic mutagen which could have driven the human race extinct. The horrors they encounter result in the loss of the crew except for David and Shaw.

==== Alien: Covenant (2017) ====
Eleven years after the events of Prometheus, the colony ship USCSS Covenant, carrying thousands of colonists and hundreds of human embryos in cryo-stasis, makes its way towards the planet Origae-6. The crew is awakened by a neutrino blast and intercepts a transmission sent from Shaw, which they decide to trace to an apparently habitable Engineer home world (referred to as Planet 4), devoid of all non-floral life. When several crew members are infected by the same mutagen encountered by the Prometheus crew and give birth to a new breed of Alien, the Neomorphs, the android David 8 rescues them. It is revealed that he brought Shaw to the planet, where he killed all non-floral life and began experimenting on Shaw's corpse to engineer his own breeds of Aliens. His motive to replace human life with Aliens is made apparent, and with the birth of yet another new breed of Alien, a terraforming expert named Daniels and the remaining crew are forced to flee from the world. After disposing of the Aliens chasing them, the crew members return to the Covenant and are put back into cryosleep by someone they believe to be their shipboard synthetic, Walter. Only when Daniels is put in her cryopod does she realize that Walter has been replaced by the identical David. With the crew, colonists, and embryos at his mercy, David contacts Weyland-Yutani back on Earth, stating that while the majority of the crew was killed in the neutrino blast, they would continue to Origae-6.

==== Alien: Romulus (2024) ====
Five downtrodden young space colonists and a synthetic encounter hostile Alien creatures while scavenging a derelict Weyland-Yutani space station in which they plan to scavenge cryopods that enables them to survive a journey to another more liveable planet.

=== Crossover series ===
Inspired by the Dark Horse Comics series, the filmmakers of Predator 2 (1990) incorporated an Easter egg in which an Alien skull was seen in a Predator trophy case. Expansions upon this shared universe between the Alien and Predator franchises followed through comics and video games, leading up to the launch of a film franchise with the release of Alien vs. Predator in 2004, followed by Aliens vs. Predator: Requiem in 2007. The franchise has spawned various comics, novels, video games, and other merchandise based upon or inspired by the films. A third film has been variously rumored since the production of Requiem. In mid-2018, Shane Black, the director of The Predator, expressed his belief that a third Alien vs. Predator could still happen, indicating the studio's interest in both franchises.

In August 2024, Fede Álvarez, the director of Alien: Romulus, also said he was open to directing a third Alien vs. Predator film, proposing to Melanie Brooks and Anthony D'Alessandro of Deadline Hollywood that he would enjoy directing it along with Dan Trachtenberg, the director of the Predator films Prey (2022) and Predator: Badlands (2025): "Maybe it's something I have to co-direct with my buddy Dan. Maybe we should do like [Quentin] Tarantino and Robert Rodriguez did with [From] Dusk till Dawn. I'll direct a half, and he'll direct another half." In October of the same year, Steve Abell (President of Fox Studios) stated that the studio has plans to eventually develop an Alien and Predator crossover film. The Weyland-Yutani Corporation featured in the Alien franchise along with their particular android model featured in Alien: Romulus appears in the upcoming Predator: Badlands film as a stepping stone towards a third Alien vs. Predator film.

==== Alien vs. Predator (2004) ====
In 2004, a Predator mothership arrives in Earth orbit to draw humans to an ancient Predator training ground on Bouvetøya, an island about one thousand miles north of Antarctica. A buried pyramid giving off a "heat bloom" attracts a group of explorers led by billionaire and self-taught engineer Charles Bishop Weyland (Lance Henriksen), the original founder and CEO of Weyland Industries, who unknowingly activates an Alien egg production line as a hibernating Alien queen is awakened within the pyramid. Three Predators descend to the planet and enter the structure, killing all humans in their way with the intention of hunting the newly formed Aliens, while the scattered explorers are captured alive by Aliens and implanted with embryos. Two Predators die in the ensuing battle with an Alien, while the third allies itself with the lone surviving human, Alexa "Lex" Woods (Sanaa Lathan), while making their way out of the pyramid as it is destroyed by the Predator's wrist bomb and eventually does battle with the escaped Alien Queen on the surface. The Queen is defeated by being dragged down by a water tower into the dark depths of the frozen sea, but not before she fatally wounds the last Predator. The orbiting Predator mothership uncloaks and the crew retrieves the fallen Predator. A Predator elder gives Lex a spear as a sign of respect, and then departs. Once in orbit it is revealed that an Alien Chestburster was present within the corpse, thus a Predalien hybrid is born.

==== Aliens vs. Predator: Requiem (2007) ====
Set immediately after the events of the previous film, the Predalien hybrid aboard the Predator scout ship, having just separated from the mothership shown in the previous film, has grown to full adult size and sets about killing the Predators aboard the ship, causing it to crash in the small town of Gunnison, Colorado. The last surviving Predator activates a distress beacon containing a video recording of the Predalien, which is received by a veteran Predator on the Predator homeworld, who sets off towards Earth to "clean up" the infestation. When it arrives, the Predator tracks the Aliens into a section of the sewer below the town. He removes evidence of their presence as he moves along using a corrosive blue liquid and uses a laser net to try to contain the creatures, but the Aliens still manage to escape into the town above. The Predator fashions a plasma pistol from its remaining plasma caster and hunts Aliens all across town, accidentally cutting the power to the town in the process. During a confrontation with human survivors, the Predator loses its plasma pistol. The Predator then fights the Predalien singlehandedly, and the two mortally wound one another just as the US air force drops a tactical nuclear bomb on the town, incinerating both combatants along with the Predalien's warriors and hive, as well as the few remaining humans in the town. The salvaged plasma pistol is then taken to Ms. Cullen Yutani of the Yutani Corporation, foreshadowing an advancement in technology leading to the future events of the Alien films.

=== Future ===
In the mid-1990s, screenwriter Stuart Hazeldine wrote a treatment, Alien: Earthbound. Fox executives were impressed by the script, having read it after Alien Resurrection had entered post-production. According to Sigourney Weaver, Joss Whedon had written an Earth-set script for Alien 5, but Weaver was not interested and wanted it to be set on the original planetoid. She has remained open to a role on the condition that she likes the story. Before 20th Century Fox greenlit Alien vs. Predator, James Cameron had been collaborating on the plot for a fifth Alien film with another writer, but ceased work on learning of the crossover. Cameron stated that the crossover would "kill the validity of the franchise", and that "it was Frankenstein Meets Werewolf" – like "Universal just taking their assets and starting to play them off against each other." Although he liked the final product, he ruled out any future involvement with the series. In late 2008, Weaver hinted in an interview with MTV that she and Scott were working on an Alien spin-off film, which would focus on the chronicles of Ellen Ripley rather than on the Aliens, but the continuation of Ripley's story has not materialized.

In 2015, Sigourney Weaver expressed her interest in returning to the role of Ripley with Neill Blomkamp's story (purportedly titled Alien: Awakening) which would tie into the first two Alien films by taking place after Aliens and foregoing involvement with the other two sequels. This was canceled in favor of Scott's own untitled third prequel (also purportedly titled Alien: Awakening). In February 2019, James Cameron stated that he was working on reviving Blomkamp's project. In June 2020, Brandywine Productions revealed that a screenplay for a new installment in the original series called Alien V, centered around Ripley, had been written by Walter Hill and David Giler. In an interview with The Hollywood Reporter published in September 2022, Hill confirmed that the proposed alternative sequel involving Weaver would not be moving forward. Blomkamp reused some of his proposed concepts for Alien V in his short film Rakka, also starring Sigourney Weaver.

After the acquisition of 21st Century Fox by The Walt Disney Company, it was officially confirmed at the 2019 CinemaCon that future Alien films are in development. In May 2019, Variety reported that the third prequel film was "in the script phase", with Ridley Scott attached to serve once again as director. In September 2020, Scott confirmed that work on the next installment is ongoing, but whether the plot would be connected to Prometheus and Alien: Covenant was undecided. In October 2024, Scott confirmed he was already developing a new Alien film. In June 2025, Scott announced his departure from the Alien franchise, saying "where it's going now, I think I've done enough, and I just hope it goes further", while expressing his critiques of the Alien sequels; though in August, Scott updated his stance and was open to a third prequel film saying, "Another Alien prequel — yeah, if I get an idea, for sure". In October 2025, Sigourney Weaver announced that she has had discussions with The Walt Disney Company and 20th Century Studios to reprise her role in an upcoming project, with a script being written by Walter Hill.

As of March 2026, following the success of Alien: Romulus and the TV show Alien: Earth, a Romulus sequel was said to be in the works. Romulus director Fede Álvarez is writing the screenplay and will co-produce with Ridley Scott. New directors for the sequel are being explored, including Michael Sarnoski, who wrote and directed Pig (2021), A Quiet Place: Day One (2024), and The Death of Robin Hood (2026). In August 2026, Scott confirmed he was working on a sequel to Alien: Covenant that would focus on David creating a "brave new world for himself." In October 2026, Aaron Guzikowski was announced to write a new film.

== Short films ==
Alien short films
Film	U.S. release date	Director(s)	Screenwriter(s)	Producer(s)
TED 2023	February 28, 2012	Luke Scott	Damon Lindelof	RSA Films
Happy Birthday, David	April 17, 2012	Johnny Hardstaff	Damon Lindelof & Johnny Hardstaff	RSA Films
Quiet Eye: Elizabeth Shaw	May 16, 2012	Johnny Hardstaff	Damon Lindelof	RSA Films
Project Prometheus: Mission	May 30, 2012	Chris Eyerman & Evan DeHaven	Ashley Crandall, James Cobo, & Nina Kauffman	Ignition Interactive
Weyland Industries Testimonial	June 27, 2012	N/A	N/A	20th Century Fox
Prometheus Transmission	October 11, 2012	Johnny Hardstaff	Michael Ellenberg & Johnny Hardstaff	RSA Films
Alien: Covenant — Prologue: Last Supper	February 22, 2017	Luke Scott	Will Melton	RSA Films
Alien: Covenant — Meet Walter	March 10, 2017	Luke Scott	Will Melton & Chris Eyerman	RSA Films
Alien: Covenant — Crew Messages	April 17–20, 2017	N/A	N/A	20th Century Fox
Alien: Covenant — Prologue: The Crossing	April 26, 2017	Ridley Scott	John Logan & Dante Harper	20th Century Fox
Alien: Covenant — She Won't Go Quietly	May 5, 2017	Luke Scott		RSA Films
Alien: Covenant — Rick and Morty	May 15, 2017	Justin Roiland	Justin Roiland	20th Century Fox
Alien: Covenant — Phobos	July 19, 2017	Toby Dye	John Logan & Toby Dye	20th Century Fox
Alien: Covenant — Advent	August 15, 2017	Matthew Thorne	Will Melton	20th Century Fox
Alien: Containment	March 29, 2019	Chris Reading	Chris Reading	Tongal Studios
Alien: Specimen	April 5, 2019	Kelsey Taylor	Federico Fracchia	Tongal Studios
Alien: Night Shift	April 12, 2019	Aidan Breznick	Aidan Breznick	Tongal Studios
Alien: Ore	April 19, 2019	Kailey & Sam Spear	Kailey & Sam Spear	Tongal Studios
Alien: Harvest	April 26, 2019	Benjamin Howdeshell	Craig Dewey	Tongal Studios
Alien: Alone	April 26, 2019	Noah Miller	Noah Miller	Tongal Studios
Alien: Covenant — David's Lab: Last Signs of Life	August 15, 2019	Allen Colombo	Milena Westarb	Effie Studios

In 2012 and 2017 respectively, fourteen short films were produced to tie in with the releases of Prometheus and Alien: Covenant. In July 2018, it was reported that 20th Century Fox had joined forces with Tongal to produce short films, intended to coincide with the 40th anniversary of the Alien franchise. By March 2019, the details of the anthology short films were released. Tongal co-founder and CEO James DeJulio stated that the joint-production is "reflective of Tongal's mission to bring creative opportunities to the next generation of talent." The shorts were released weekly on IGN, after which they were uploaded to the Alien Universe web page, as well as all Alien social media pages on May 5 of the same year. All six of the short films premiered at the Emerald City Comic Con in Seattle. The 40th anniversary short films are available as a Movies Anywhere-exclusive bonus feature accompanying the digital release of Alien.

== Television and web series ==
Series	Season	Episodes	Originally released			Showrunner(s)	Status
Series	Season	Episodes	First released	Last released	Network	Showrunner(s)	Status
Alien: Isolation – The Digital Series	1	7	February 28, 2019		IGN	Kinga Smith and Fabien Dubois	Concluded
Alien: Earth	1	8	August 12, 2025	September 23, 2025	FX; FX on Hulu	Noah Hawley	Released
Alien: Earth	2	TBA	TBA	TBA	FX; FX on Hulu	Noah Hawley	Post-production

In 1979, 20th Century Fox considered producing a television series based on the 1979 film Alien, with the intention of ABC picking it up, but its only media coverage was in the June 1980 Fangoria issue #6. In 1992, an animated series inspired by the 1986 film Aliens titled Operation: Aliens was being developed along with an LCD game, board game, a Sega Genesis video game by THQ, and action figures. However, the brand lived on through Kenner toylines as simply Aliens and in the comics series included with the action figures as well as in the Aliens/Predator Universe trading cards set. In 2007, Ain't It Cool News reported that a (since cancelled) animated series inspired by the 1986 film Aliens titled Aliens: War Games was being developed.

=== Alien: Isolation – The Digital Series (2019) ===
In 2014, Sega published the video game Alien: Isolation. In 2019, a seven-episode animated adaptation of the same name was released on February 28. The series, developed by 20th Century Fox, in conjunction with Reverse Engineering Studios and DVgroup, was created using a combination of brand-new scenes animated from scratch, cinematics taken directly from the original game, and digital recreations of first-person scenes from the game. Alien: Isolation is set in 2137, 15 years after the events of Alien and 42 years prior to Aliens, following Amanda Ripley, who is investigating the disappearance of her mother, Ellen Ripley, as she is transferred to the space station Sevastopol to find the flight recorder of the Nostromo only to discover an Alien has terrorized the station, killing the vast majority of the crew. Andrea Deck reprises her role as Amanda Ripley.

=== Alien: Earth (2025–present) ===
On December 10, 2020, as part of Disney's Investor Day presentation, a new TV series project based on the franchise was announced to be in development for FX on Hulu, with Noah Hawley and Scott being involved (the former as showrunner and the latter as producer). It will be set on Earth in the near future, thus marking the first of the franchise to do so without featuring Ellen Ripley. At the 2021 Television Critics Association Press Tour, FX network's John Landgraf said that the series will probably premiere in 2023. A casting sheet for characters Hermit and Wendy shed light on the show's leads. Reports suggested that the TV series would start filming in March 2022, but production was delayed until 2023, due to the COVID-19 pandemic. On April 6, Landgraf stated that the series was in "active preproduction". On July 19, the production of the series began in Thailand with Sydney Chandler, Alex Lawther and Samuel Blenkin being cast as the series' lead roles. Alien: Earth premiered on FX and FX on Hulu on August 12, 2025. Though many people have misinterpreted showrunner Noah Hawley's comments about the series (claiming it takes place in an alternate timeline within the Alien universe rather than being part of the main canon), Hawley actually only said "It's got to be its own thing," going on to talk about how he brings together different influences and doesn't follow the existing template for Alien-universe stories.

== Cast and crew ==
=== Principal cast ===
List indicators

This section includes characters who will appear or have appeared in the franchise.

- An empty grey cell indicates the character was not in the film, or that the character's official presence has not yet been confirmed.
- ^{C} indicates a cameo role.
- ^{E} indicates an appearance not included in the theatrical cut.
- ^{MC} indicates a motion-capture-only role.
- ^{P} indicates an appearance in onscreen photographs.
- ^{U} indicates an uncredited appearance.
- ^{V} indicates a voice-only role.
- ^{Y} indicates a younger version of the character.

Character	Films							Web series	Television series	Alien: The Audible Original Dramas			
Character	Alien	Aliens	Alien 3	Alien Resurrection	Prometheus	Alien: Covenant	Alien: Romulus	Alien: Isolation – The Digital Series	Alien: Earth	Alien: Out of the Shadows	Alien: River of Pain	Sea of Sorrows	Alien 3
Character	1979	1986	1992	1997	2012	2017	2024	2019	2025	2016	2017	2018	2019
==== Main characters ====
Ellen Ripley	Sigourney Weaver	Sigourney Weaver	Sigourney Weaver	Sigourney Weaver				Andrea Deck^{V}		Laurel Lefkow^{V}	Laurel Lefkow^{V}	Laurel Lefkow^{V}	Laurel Lefkow^{V}
Aliens	Bolaji Badejo	Carl Toop	Tom Woodruff Jr.	Tom Woodruff Jr.	Appeared	Andrew Crawford Goran D. Kleut	Trevor Newlin Robert Bobroczkyi	Appeared	Appeared	Appeared	Appeared	Appeared	Appeared
Ash / Rook	Ian Holm	Ian Holm^{P}					Ian Holm (digital effect)			Rutger Hauer^{V}			
Bishop II Michael Bishop Weyland		Lance Henriksen	Lance Henriksen										Lance Henriksen^{V}
Rebecca "Newt" Jorden		Carrie Henn	Danielle Edmond							Mairead Doherty^{V}		Mairead Doherty^{V}	
Dwayne Hicks		Michael Biehn	Michael Biehn^{P}										Michael Biehn^{V}
Anne Jorden		Holly De Jong									Anna Friel^{V}		
Amanda "Amy" Ripley-McClaren		Elizabeth Inglis^{E}^{P}						Andrea Deck^{V} Kezia Burrows^{MC}					
Ripley 8				Sigourney Weaver Nicole Fellows^{Y}								Laurel Lefkow^{V}	
Annalee Call				Winona Ryder									
Elizabeth M. Shaw					Noomi Rapace Lucy Hutchinson^{Y}	Noomi Rapace^{U}^{P}							
David^{8}					Michael Fassbender	Michael Fassbender							
Peter Weyland					Guy Pearce	Guy Pearce^{U}				Guy Pearce^{V}			
Charlie Holloway					Logan Marshall-Green	Logan Marshall-Green^{P}							
==== Supporting characters ====
Arthur Dallas	Tom Skerritt	Tom Skerritt^{P}											
Joan Lambert	Veronica Cartwright	Veronica Cartwright^{P}											
Samuel Brett	Harry Dean Stanton	Harry Dean Stanton^{P}											
Gilbert Kane	John Hurt	John Hurt^{P}											
Dennis Parker	Yaphet Kotto	Yaphet Kotto^{P}											
MU / TH / UR 6000 "Mother / Father"	Helen Horton^{V}			Steven Gilborn^{V}		Lorelei King^{V}	Annemarie Griggs^{V} ( MU/TH/UR 9000 )		Robin August^{V}	Tom Alexander^{V}			Lorelei King^{V}
Jones	Various animal performers	Various animal performers								Various animal performers	Various animal performers		
Engineers	Appeared				Ian Whyte John Lebar Daniel James	Appeared		Appeared					
Scott Gorman		William Hope								William Hope^{V}			
Al Simpson		Mac McDonald								Mac McDonald^{V}			
Jernigan		Stuart Milligan								Stuart Milligan^{V}			
Russ Jorden		Jay Benedict								Marc Warren^{V}			
Timmy Jorden		Christopher Henn								Matt Keith Rauch^{V}			
Hudson		Bill Paxton											

=== Additional crew ===
Crew of Alien films
Film	Crew/detail				
Film	Composer(s)	Cinematographer	Editor(s)	Production companies	Distributor
Alien	Jerry Goldsmith	Derek Vanlint	Terry Rawlings Peter Weatherley	20th Century Fox; Brandywine Productions; Brandywine-Ronald Shusett Productions	20th Century Fox
Aliens	James Horner	Adrian Biddle	Ray Lovejoy	20th Century Fox; SLM Production Group; Brandywine Productions	20th Century Fox
Alien 3	Elliot Goldenthal	Alex Thomson	Terry Rawlings	20th Century Fox; Brandywine Productions	20th Century Fox
Alien Resurrection	John Frizzell	Darius Khondji	Hervé Schneid	20th Century Fox; Brandywine Productions	20th Century Fox
Prometheus	Marc Streitenfeld	Dariusz Wolski	Pietro Scalia	20th Century Fox; Dune Entertainment; Scott Free Productions; Brandywine Productions	20th Century Fox
Alien: Covenant	Jed Kurzel	Dariusz Wolski	Pietro Scalia	20th Century Fox; Scott Free Productions; Brandywine Productions	20th Century Fox
Alien: Romulus	Benjamin Wallfisch	Galo Olivares	Jake Roberts	Scott Free Productions; Brandywine Productions	20th Century Studios (Walt Disney Studios Motion Pictures)

== Reception ==
=== Box office performance ===
Box office performance of Alien films
Film	Release date	Box office revenue			Budget	References
Film	Release date	North America	Foreign	Worldwide	Budget	References
Alien	May 25, 1979	$65,403,354	$122,631,433	$188,034,787	$10.7 million	
Aliens	July 18, 1986	$85,160,248	$98,131,008	$183,291,256	$17 million	
Alien 3	May 22, 1992	$55,473,545	$104,340,953	$159,814,498	$50–55 million	
Alien Resurrection	November 26, 1997	$47,795,658	$113,580,411	$161,376,069	$60–75 million	
Prometheus	June 8, 2012	$126,477,084	$276,877,385	$403,354,469	$125–130 million	
Alien: Covenant	May 19, 2017	$74,262,031	$168,130,018	$242,392,049	$97 million	
Alien: Romulus	August 16, 2024	$105,313,091	$245,552,251	$350,865,342	$80 million	
Total		$559,885,011	$1,129,243,459	$1,689,128,470	$439.7–464.7 million	

=== Critical and public response ===
Critical and public response of Alien films
Film	Critical		Public
Film	Rotten Tomatoes	Metacritic	CinemaScore
Alien	93% (211 reviews)	89 (34 reviews)	—N/a
Aliens	93% (172 reviews)	84 (23 reviews)	A
Alien 3	43% (127 reviews)	59 (20 reviews)	C
Alien Resurrection	55% (167 reviews)	62 (21 reviews)	B−
Prometheus	73% (311 reviews)	64 (43 reviews)	B
Alien: Covenant	65% (407 reviews)	65 (52 reviews)	B
Alien: Romulus	80% (411 reviews)	64 (57 reviews)	B+

The American Film Institute ranked Alien as the sixth most thrilling American movie and seventh-best film in the science fiction genre, and in the AFI's 100 Years... 100 Heroes and Villains list, Ripley was ranked eighth among the heroes, and the Alien was fourteenth among the villains. IGN listed Alien as the thirteenth best film franchise of all time in 2006. Alien was also inducted into the National Film Registry of the Library of Congress for historical preservation as a film which is "culturally, historically, or aesthetically significant."

Critical response of Alien series
Title	Season	Rotten Tomatoes	Metacritic
Alien: Earth	1	94% (200 reviews)	85 (41 reviews)

=== Accolades ===
==== Academy Awards ====
Academy Award nominations for Alien films
Award	Alien	Aliens	Alien 3	Prometheus	Alien: Romulus
Actress		Nominated			
Art Direction	Nominated	Nominated			
Film Editing		Nominated			
Original Score		Nominated			
Sound		Nominated			
Sound Effects Editing		Won			
Visual Effects	Won	Won	Nominated	Nominated	Nominated

=== Alien Day ===
"Alien Day", April 26, has become the fan celebration day for the Alien franchise. The date derives from LV-426, the "426" converting to "4/26" or "April 26". On Alien Day 2016, Neill Blomkamp released new art for his concept of Alien 5, and the Audible Original audio play adaptation of Alien: Out of the Shadows was released. On Alien Day 2017, 20th Century Fox released "The Crossing" prologue short film for Alien: Covenant, and the Audible Original audio play adaptation of Alien: River of Pain was released.

=== Alien: The Play ===
From March 19 to 22, 2019, North Bergen High School (New Jersey, US) staged an adaptation of Alien entitled Alien: The Play, which was widely praised, and granted seals of approval by Ridley Scott, James Cameron, Sigourney Weaver, and Walter Hill. In the aftermath of the play's popularity and approval, North Bergen Mayor Nick Sacco's non-profit foundation pledged funds for more performances. In April 2019, Weaver made a surprise appearance and attended the play.

=== In academia ===
The Bishop character has been the subject of literary and philosophical analysis as a high-profile android character conforming to science fiction author Isaac Asimov's Three Laws of Robotics and as a model of a compliant, potentially self-aware machine. The portrayal of androids in the Alien series—Ash in Alien, Bishop in Aliens and Alien 3, and Call (Winona Ryder) in Alien Resurrection (1997)—has been studied for its implications relating to how humans deal with the presence of an "Other", as Ripley treats them with fear and suspicion, and a form of "hi-tech racism and android apartheid" is present throughout the series. This is seen as part of a larger trend of technophobia in films prior to the 1990s, with Bishop's role being particularly significant as he redeems himself at the end of Aliens, thus confounding Ripley's expectations.

== Music ==
Soundtracks for Alien films
Title	U.S. release date	Length	Composer(s)	Label
Alien: Original Motion Picture Score	1979	33:37	Jerry Goldsmith	20th Century
Aliens: Original Motion Picture Soundtrack	October 25, 1987	39:57	James Horner	Varèse Sarabande
Alien 3: Original Motion Picture Soundtrack	June 9, 1992	47:58	Elliot Goldenthal	MCA
Alien Resurrection: Complete Motion Picture Score	November 11, 1997	45:13	John Frizzell	RCA
Prometheus: Original Motion Picture Soundtrack	May 15, 2012	57:07	Marc Streitenfeld	Sony Classical; Fox Music
Alien: Covenant (Original Soundtrack Album)	May 19, 2017	58:57	Jed Kurzel	Milan
Alien: Romulus (Original Motion Picture Soundtrack)	August 16, 2024	56:56	Benjamin Wallfisch	Hollywood

Soundtracks for other Alien entries
Title	U.S. release date	Length	Composer(s)	Label	Ref.
Alien: Blackout (Original Video Game Soundtrack)	January 29, 2019	15:23	Tommi Hartikainen	Hollywood	
Alien: Isolation (Original Video Game Soundtrack)	October 07, 2024^{[a]}	49:05	The Flight and Christian Henson	20th Century	
Alien: Earth (Original Soundtrack)	August 12, 2025	1:31:47	Jeff Russo	FX Productions, LLC	
Alien: Earth . 5 "In Space, No One..." (Original Soundtrack)	September 2, 2025	28:34	Jeff Russo	FX Productions, LLC	

Notes

- ^{^[a]} released on the 10 year anniversary of the game.

== Home media ==
There have been dozens of stand-alone releases of the individual films on various formats, including Betamax, VHS, Laserdisc, DVD, and Blu-ray. The multiple single releases on VHS were generally the original theatrical cuts of each film.

Laserdisc saw single releases of all theatrical versions, as well as two so-called "box sets" which only contained one film (there were two single releases, one each for Alien and Aliens) but had multiple discs and a large amount of supplemental material with a high retail price tag (around US$100). The Aliens set included a new "Special Edition" cut of the film completed by James Cameron just for this release, which was a significantly extended version of the film.

The films made their DVD debut in 1999, both as part of a boxed set (see Alien Legacy below) and as separate single-disc releases of each film (Aliens was only available in its "Special Edition" cut, not its original theatrical cut, which did not make it to DVD until the next boxed set). Following the Alien Quadrilogy set (see below), each film received individual two-disc releases containing the content of each film from that set. Since then, there have been multiple issues and reissues of the films, in both their theatrical or extended version, though some single releases include both.

In addition to the single releases, there have been seven complete box sets of the series at various points in its history. With the exception of the DVD version of the Aliens Triple Pack, each release contained all films that had come out at the time the sets were released. The seven box sets each had unique characteristics and features which were then sometimes reused in later sets or single releases in one form or another, most notably the Blu-ray Anthology, which includes a detailed archive of many previous releases, including the rare Laserdisc box sets.

- Alien Triple Pack (VHS, 1992), containing the first two films in the series and a third cassette with a 23-minute preview of the then upcoming theatrical release of Alien 3. (Not to be confused with the 2008 DVD set of the same name below.)
- Alien Trilogy (VHS, 1993), a three-cassette packaging of Alien, Aliens (in its LaserDisc Special Edition cut, for the first time on another format) and Alien 3.
- Alien Saga (VHS, 1997), UK boxed set with the first three films plus a "Making of Alien Resurrection" cassette. It was released again in 1998 with the Alien Resurrection film included. A Japan-exclusive Laserdisc pack containing the first three films released in 1999 also had the same name. (A planned U.S. version was canceled as DVDs were quickly taking over the much smaller domestic Laserdisc market in that country.)
- Alien Legacy (VHS/DVD, 1999), a four-volume set containing the 1991 Laserdisc "Special Edition" cut of Aliens, the theatrical versions of the other three films, and on DVD various supplemental materials that were either re-used from Laserdisc or newly created.
- Alien Quadrilogy (DVD, 2003), considered one of the most exhaustive box sets of the DVD era in terms of content and special features, was spread over nine discs: four discs (one disc each) for the theatrical and extended cuts of each film (new "2003" cuts of Alien, Alien 3, and Alien Resurrection and the previously released 1991 "Special Edition" cut of Aliens), four discs containing special features specific to each film, and an extra disc of documentaries and other supplemental content.
  - The films were later re-released as two-disc individual titles as part of 20th Century Fox's Collector's Series.
- Alien Triple Pack (DVD, 2008), a three-disc package including the theatrical cuts of Alien and Alien 3, as well as the "Special Edition" of Aliens. This set reused the name of the 1992 VHS set (this was an unusual release in that Alien Resurrection was not included, making this the first franchise box set it had not appeared in since its release).
- Alien Anthology (Blu-ray, 2010), an exclusive six-disc release featuring two versions of each film (theatrical, and the 2003 cuts from the Alien Quadrilogy set—except for changes to the 2003 Alien 3 "Workprint" version which included having some original voice actors come back to re-record poorly captured dialogue in newly inserted extended scenes, and fixed production errors on the "special edition" of Aliens) and almost all special features and supplements from the previous releases (including an archive of the special edition Laserdisc box sets with all their image galleries and other unique content). As with the Quadrilogy DVD, the two versions of each film were housed on a single disc, while the storage capacity of Blu-ray means the previous five discs of special features were included on the remaining two discs in the set, which held approximately 60 hours of bonus video content and over 12,000 still images. Most subsequent releases of the films on the Blu-ray medium are repackaged versions of the Blu-ray disks contained in this box set. A discount box set without the two additional discs of bonus features was also released.
- Alien/Aliens Dual Pack (DVD), including the theatrical cuts of both Alien and Aliens. A separate dual pack was released containing the theatrical and extended versions of Alien vs. Predator and the unrated Aliens vs. Predator: Requiem.
- Prometheus to Alien: The Evolution (Blu-ray, 2012), containing all of the Alien films, Prometheus, and a bonus material disk for Prometheus.
- All of the Alien films, including Prometheus, have been released in special SteelBook Blu-ray editions, although these do not come in a boxed set. While the Alien SteelBooks themselves contain the Blu-ray disks on their own, the Prometheus SteelBook contains both Blu-ray and Blu-ray 3D versions of the film, as well as a bonus feature Blu-ray disk with seven hours of content. With the exception of Prometheus, the films had been previously released as DVD Definitive editions, which featured SteelBook casing and contained both DVD versions (theatrical and directors cuts) of the films and a bonus feature disk.
- Alien: The 35th Anniversary Edition (Blu-ray, 2014), released to mark the 35th anniversary of the release of the film, containing both a Blu-ray and a Digital HD copy, a reprint of Alien: The Illustrated Story and a series of collectible art cards containing artwork by H. R. Giger related to the film. The disk itself is the same as the respective disk on the 2010 Anthology Blu-ray release, and contains MOTHER mode, despite the lack of the required bonus disk. A reprint of the novel by Alan Dean Foster was also released, along with reprints of all other novels, with the Alien Resurrection novel available as of May 2015.
- The Alien Universe box set was released exclusively through Walmart on April 18, 2017, and included four limited edition poster cards designed by the Mondo art company.
- The Alien: 6-Film Collection, released in 2017 in regular Blu-ray and SteelBook, contains the first six films in the franchise.

== Other media ==
There exists a great number of spin-offs in other media, including a large number of crossovers with the Predator franchise.

=== Print media ===
Alien print media has been published since shortly before the release of the original eponymous film, in 1979. The full library of these literary works include novelizations of the films, original content that expand upon the fictional universe, comics and companion books for both the cataloging of in-universe elements and supplemental works concerning the development of the franchise. These include works by special effects company Amalgamated Dynamics Incorporated (ADI), which assisted with the effects in Alien 3 and Alien Resurrection.

==== Novels ====
Several novelizations of each of the six films and some comic books as well as original canonical novels based on the franchise have been released. The original novels include Alien: Out of the Shadows, Alien: Sea of Sorrows, Alien: River of Pain, marketed as the "Canonical Alien Trilogy" and the short story collection Aliens: Bug Hunt. Out of the Shadows and River of Pain were adapted into audio dramas in 2016 and 2017 respectively released on the Alien Day of the respective year. Alan Dean Foster published Alien: Covenant – Origins, a novel set between the events of Prometheus and Alien: Covenant. Titan Books would also release a series of different novels, including for example Aliens: Phalanx in 2020 and Alien: Uncivil War in 2024.

==== Comic books ====
In addition to Alien: The Illustrated Story, a graphic novel adaptation of the original film, there have been numerous limited series set in the Alien universe, as well as non-canonical crossover appearances of the Alien. In addition to Alien vs. Predator comics featuring the Alien and Predator battling, Dark Horse Comics published Fire and Stone between 2014 and 2017, crossing over the continuities of the Prometheus prequel series with the Alien vs. Predator franchise.

Dark Horse Comics also published a number of other miniseries crossovers, featuring the Alien species as an enemy pitted against prolific characters from other continuities. In 1995, the miniseries Superman/Aliens featured Aliens fighting against Superman, while his powers are diminished. Between 1997 and 2002, a two-part miniseries called Batman/Aliens was published, depicting Batman fighting against a horde of Aliens in a jungle bordering Mexico and Guatemala. In 1998, WildStorm, (now a part of Image Comics), and Dark Horse Comics published an intercompany crossover event called WildC.A.T.s/Aliens, featuring the Wildcats battling the Aliens. Green Lantern Versus Aliens, an intercompany crossover event between Dark Horse and DC Comics, features a plot beyond either continuity, where the Aliens residing on the Green Lantern planet Mogo get out of control and must be exterminated. In 2003, Dark Horse published Judge Dredd vs. Aliens, depicting an Alien invasion in Mega-City One, necessitating for Judge Dredd to intervene, to destroy the infestation.

In July 2020, Marvel Comics announced that it had acquired the comic book rights to the Alien franchise, in addition to the rights to the Predator and Alien vs. Predator franchises. Marvel announced the Alien series in December 2020, with Phillip Kennedy Johnson writing and Salvador Larroca illustrating it. Issue #1 was released in March 2021.

==== Picture books ====
Jonesy: Nine Lives on the Nostromo is a 2018 picture book that retells the plot of Alien (1979) from the perspective of Jones, the ship's cat from the film.

=== Video games ===
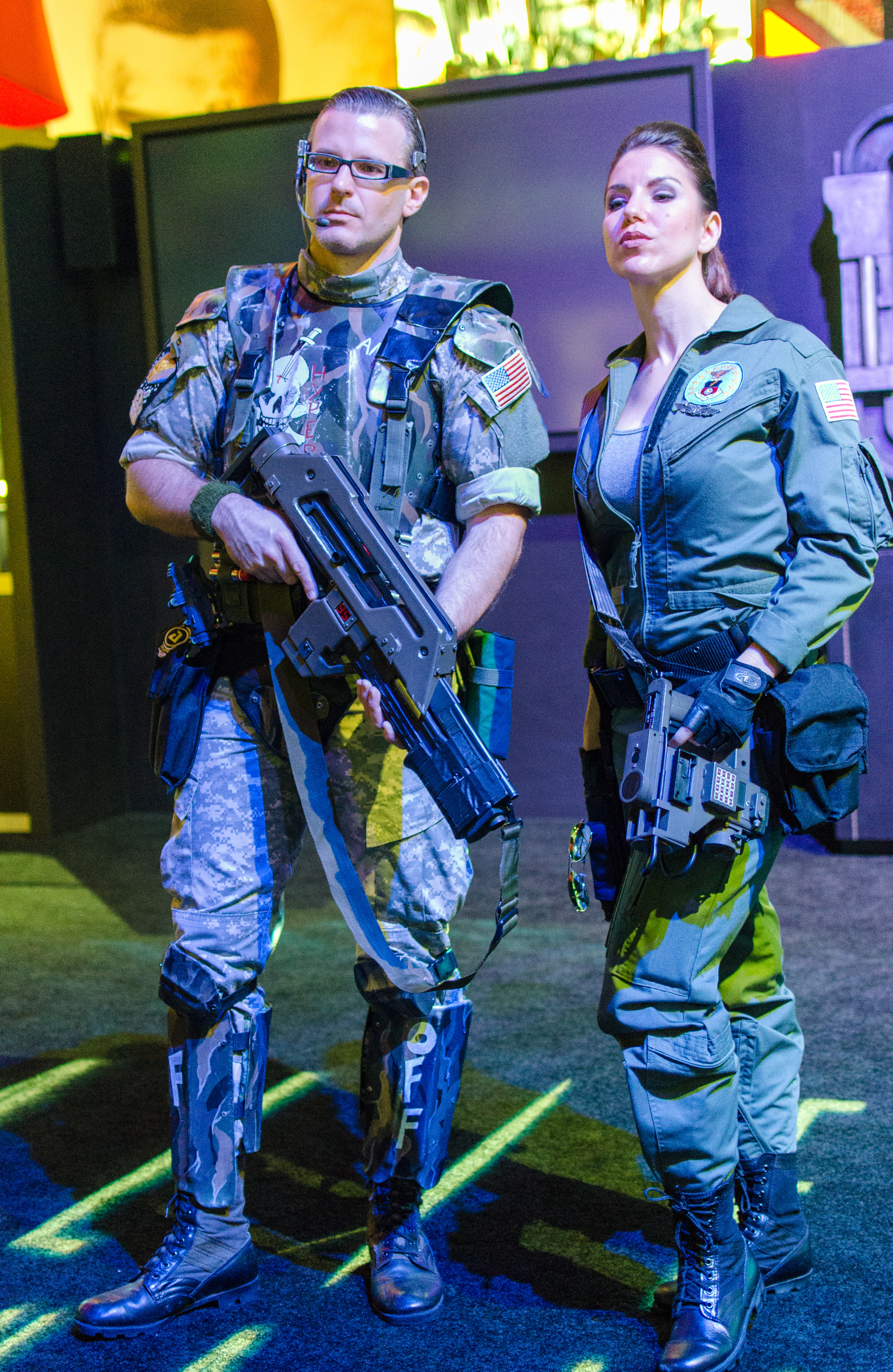
Promotion of Aliens: Colonial Marines at E3 2012

Since the launch of the Alien franchise, there have been numerous video games released over the years, spanning a variety of genres. In addition to appearances in crossover video games, including those from the Alien vs. Predator franchise, Mortal Kombat X, and Dead by Daylight, the four films from the original series were adapted into video games, typically multiple times.

The first release was Alien (1982) for the Atari 2600, inspired heavily by Pac-Man. A second adaptation of the first film was released in 1984.

The sequel, Aliens was adapted into four different video games: two different 1986 games titled Aliens: The Computer Game, one of them a collection of minigames by Activision, and the other one a first-person shooter by Software Studios; as well as two different games titled Aliens, a 1987 MSX platformer by Square and a the other one a 1990 arcade shoot 'em up by Konami.

Acclaim Entertainment released three different games based on Alien 3; two different run and gun platformers - one for consoles in 1992, another for the SNES a year later - and a Game Boy adventure game in 1993. Sega also released a light gun arcade game Alien 3: The Gun in 1993. Acclaim's first-person shooter Alien Trilogy was released in 1996 and their adaptation of Alien Resurrection was released in 2000 as a PlayStation first-person shooter.

Other Alien games include Mindscape's adventure game Aliens: A Comic Book Adventure (1995), the first-person shooter Aliens Online (1998), the Game Boy Color action game Aliens: Thanatos Encounter (2001), the mobile phone game Aliens: Unleashed (2003), and the arcade game Aliens: Extermination (2006). In 2014, Play Mechanix and Raw Thrills released Aliens: Armageddon, a rail gun first person shooter that hit arcades soon after. Between 2016 and 2017, Zen Studios released downloadable content packs in a product line called "Alien vs. Pinball", featuring three virtual pinball tables based around the Alien and Alien vs. Predator franchises for Zen Pinball 2, Pinball FX 2 and Pinball FX 3.

In 2006, Sega made a deal with Fox Licensing to release two Alien video games for sixth generation consoles. The first was Aliens: Colonial Marines, a first-person shooter by Gearbox Software that was released in 2013 for the Xbox 360, PlayStation 3 and Windows. The game is set between Aliens and Alien 3, following a group of marines sent to investigate the Sulaco who wound up crash-landing on LV-426.

The second was Alien: Isolation, a survival-horror game by Creative Assembly that follows Ripley's daughter, Amanda, who is stranded aboard an Alien-infested space station. The game experienced a long development cycle, with it finally being released in late 2014 for seventh generation consoles. During the prolonged development of Alien: Isolation, Sega also released a Nintendo DS game Aliens Infestation in 2011. Furthermore, a spin-off featuring Amanda Ripley called Alien: Blackout was released for mobile devices in 2019.

Aliens: Dark Descent, a real-time strategy game developed by Tindalos Interactive in collaboration with Disney's 20th Century Games and published by Focus Entertainment was announced during the Summer Game Fest in June 2022 and was released on June 20, 2023. The Dark Descent story is set 19 years after the events of the original trilogy films. It received generally positive reviews from critics.

On October 7, 2024, the 10 year anniversary of the aforementioned Alien: Isolation's release, Sega and Creative Assembly announced that a sequel to Alien: Isolation was in early development.

On December 19, 2024, Survios developed and published Alien: Rogue Incursion, a virtual reality game. On September 30, 2025, the Evolved Edition was released as a non-VR version of the game. Alien: Rogue Incursion is the first of a two-part story, with a second game in development.

=== Merchandising ===
Despite Alien being widely considered a mature and non child-appropriate series, merchandise — including action figures, board games and role-playing games — has been manufactured and marketed to a wide range of age groups. Prior to the release of the first film, 20th Century Fox executives signed a deal with Kenner Products, for the production of a board game called Alien Game, as well as action figures, marketed for being family-friendly. Following the release of the film and the outcry from parents about its nature of being a graphic and mature horror film, the product lines were abruptly cancelled. The merchandising efforts for the franchise remained largely stagnant until the release of the more action-based sequel, Aliens, seven years later. From thereon out, merchandise has been produced on a rolling, ongoing basis.

From the franchise's inception until Kenner's closure in 2000, the company was a major manufacturer of Alien action figures. From 1992 to 1995, Kenner produced a line of action figures dubbed Aliens, initially intended to promote a cancelled animated series called Operation: Aliens. In 1996, Galoob released the Micro Machines Alien line of miniature toys, but ceased production the following year, due in large to the violent and graphic nature of its packaging art. Following the founding of Hong Kong collectible toy company Hot Toys, one of the first lines the company began producing was Alien. In 2014, Funko released a line of action figures heavily inspired by the original 1979 Kenner line called ReAction. In the 2010s, the National Entertainment Collectibles Association (NECA) took a prominent role in the manufacturing of Alien action figures, with the majority being largely inspired by the Kenner line of action figures, as well as new additions depicting the prequel films and crossover continuities, such as Alien vs. Predator and Superman/Aliens.

Following Kenner's ill-fated first foray into the board game market with Alien Game, merchandising efforts in the medium were stagnant, until Leading Edge Games released the cooperative game Aliens in 1989. Leading Edge Games released Aliens Adventure Game in 1991, to mixed reviews and commentary that states it functions closer to a board game than a traditional tabletop RPG. In 1993, British toy company Peter Pan Playthings Ltd released a board game called Operation: Aliens — Combat Game, in which up to four players play as Colonial Marines and compete to reach the center of the board and self-destruct the Alien-infested facility. In December 2019, Swedish publisher Free League Publishing released a tabletop role-playing game called Alien: The Role-Playing Game, featuring two game modes. An upcoming licensed board game titled Alien: USCSS Nostromo is set for release in 2020. However, in 2018, a French board game designer named François Bachelart accused the game's publisher, Wonder Dice, of theft of a game concept he pitched to them years prior. Wonder Dice published a press release, in which they threatened to sue anyone who would question their legal practices.

=== Theme park attractions ===
An Alien-themed attraction debuted at the Genting SkyWorlds Theme Park in Malaysia in February 2022. The Park, previously known as '20th Century Fox World', has faced significant delays during construction, however, a licensing deal with Fox and new parent company The Walt Disney Company was reached. Pre-show footage of the ride was released online, and appears to detail a Weyland-Yutani themed drop tower attraction.

Alien was also previously represented in The Great Movie Ride at Disney's Hollywood Studios at Walt Disney World from 1989 until the attraction's closure in 2017. The attraction featured a scene based on the first film, in which riders were taken through the Nostromo, encountering Audio-Animatronic representations of Ripley and a Xenomorph.

== Alien vs. Predator franchise ==
Inspired by the Dark Horse Comics series, the filmmakers of Predator 2 (1990) incorporated an easter egg in which an Alien skull was seen in a Predator trophy case. Expansions upon this shared universe between the Alien and Predator franchises followed through comics and video games, leading up to the launch of a film franchise with the release of Alien vs. Predator in 2004, followed by Aliens vs. Predator: Requiem in 2007. The franchise has spawned various comics, novels, video games, and other merchandise based upon or inspired by the films. A third film has been variously rumored since the production of Requiem. In mid-2018, Shane Black, the director of The Predator, expressed his belief that a third Alien vs. Predator could still happen, indicating the studio's interest in both franchises, with Françoise Yip then reprising her role as Cullen Yutani from Requiem in a silent cameo appearance in The Predator, after her speaking scenes were cut.

=== The Predator (2018) ===
Stuntwoman Breanna Watkins, in scenes that were filmed but not used, portrayed a masked Ellen Ripley in one alternate ending of Shane Black's The Predator (2018), and an unmasked adult Rebecca "Newt" Jorden in a second alternate ending, meant to tie the main Predator franchise to the Alien franchise in which the characters first appeared, in a manner separate from the pre-existing Alien vs. Predator franchise and incorporating the plot element of time travel; Watkins later elaborated that of the two roles portrayed, while she was serving as a stand-in for Ellen Ripley ahead of a failed attempt at a Sigourney Weaver cameo, that she had actually portrayed Newt Jorden in the original ending, and had been in early discussions about potentially reprising the role in a potential Alien vs. Predator-focused sequel to The Predator.

=== Predator: Badlands (2025) ===
The 2025 film Predator: Badlands would reveal Elle Fanning portrays dual roles of Thia and Tessa whom as robot synthetics, the Weyland-Yutani corporation is also featured integrating element from the Alien series into a Predator film.

== See also ==
- List of films featuring extraterrestrials
- List of monster movies
- List of space science fiction franchises
