= The Babadook (soundtrack) =

Film score by Jed Kurzel
- Released: 7 May 2017
- Recorded: 2013–2014
- Genre: Film score
- Length: 27:59
- Label: Waxwork Records
- Producer: Jed Kurzel

Jed Kurzel chronology
Assassin's Creed (2016)	The Babadook (2017)	Alien: Covenant (2017)

The musical score to the 2014 Australian psychological horror film The Babadook written and directed by Jennifer Kent, was composed by Jed Kurzel. The film score was not released alongside the film and was published by Waxwork Records for a physical release in vinyl LP formats, and was eventually launched on 7 May 2017.

== Development ==
Jed Kurzel composed the film score, who admitted that the film was mostly in line with the Rosemary's Baby (1968) and Who Saw Her Die? (1972). He noted that Kent had a strong vision for the film, being very much into sound design and how music and sound play off each other to create a creepy horror element. Kurzel closely worked with Kent to achieve the right tone and sound that the director intended.

Kurzel admitted that "with horror movies you've got the big loud notes and the big reveal of the monster" which he disliked as it mostly accompanied for theatrical moments, and he wanted for a more subliminal and creepy approach. They usually avoided such regular tropes and went ahead experimenting with the sound and music, not making the audiences aware that how those two elements stood out or intertwine each other.

Kurzel ended up experimenting with his four-year-old daughter's voice cutting, looping and delaying which led them to make unnerving pieces that were voices trapped within the mother Amelia's head, that led to the formation of more structured musical pieces, while subsequently working on the mix, so that they could get the sense of hearing things like Amelia.

== Release ==
The soundtrack was not released along with the film. In early 2017, Waxwork Records announced the first-ever soundtrack release for the film score through a "black with red haze" vinyl, with the record sleeve featured a recreation of the pop-up book from the film. The album was released in LP records on 7 May 2017.

== Track listing ==
Side A
No.	Title	Length
1.	"Amelia's Dream / Swing"	2:36
2.	"Book Opening"	0:37
3.	"The Babadook Theme"	1:11
4.	"It's In My Room"	1:27
5.	"Shopping Mall"	3:02
6.	"The Basement / The Magician"	1:41
7.	"Don't Let It In / Ruby's Party"	3:57
Total length:		14:31

Side B
No.	Title	Length
8.	"Falling"	0:56
9.	"The Book Returns / Police Station / Falling"	2:11
10.	"Méliés"	1:01
11.	"Locking Up The House"	0:47
12.	"Amelia Taken Over"	1:25
13.	"Gliding"	1:45
14.	"Stairs"	1:02
15.	"Exorcism"	1:15
16.	"The Babadook End Credits"	3:05
Total length:		13:27

== Reception ==
David Rooney of The Hollywood Reporter wrote, "The unsettling sound design is also sharp, making sparing use of Jed Kurzel's music until panic takes hold." Betsy Sharkey of Los Angeles Times wrote, "Composer Jed Kurzel adds the right level of eerie." Don Kaye of Den of Geek wrote, "composer Jed Kurzel takes simple themes and imbues them with a sense of menace and fear." Heather Phares of AllMusic denoted the score as "equally thrilling".

Michael Gingold of Fangoria wrote, "Composer Jed Kurzel and sound designer Frank Lipson conjure up an aural atmosphere to match, highlighted by the eerie whispers of the Babadook as it hovers over Amelia's body and mind." Diane Carson of KDHX noted the music and sound design being well utilized. Frank Hatherley of Screen International and Scott Foundas of Variety described the score as "scary" and "terrifying".

Richie Correlli of Horror DNA wrote, "The magnificence of this album is how expertly Kurzel stays to his themes. The record maintains a steady sound and mood by keeping to a limited timbre and tempo pallet. It does this without sounding stale or repetitive. Album length may have something to do with this. The record is under 30 minutes long. Listeners who prefer to drop the needle and zone out to the music may be disappointed when they have to get up and flip the disc before they reach the 15-minute mark. But a shorter album with no filler is arguably better than a long album that drags." Sarah Ward of Screen Hub wrote, "An atmospheric score by Jed Kurzel (Snowtown), both delightfully dulcet in teasing refrains, and hauntingly dark in the most frightening segments, ties it all together."
