= Jonesy =

Jonesy may refer to:

== People ==
- Brendan Jones (radio personality) (born 1968), Australian radio host
- Steve Jones (musician), Sex Pistols guitarist and radio host
- John Paul Jones (musician) (born 1946), member of the band Led Zeppelin
- Justin Roderick Jones (born 1983), Australian explorer, member of the duo Cas and Jonesy
- Jesper Kyd (born 1972), Danish video game composer

== Fictional characters ==
- Jonesy, a character in the HBO series Carnivàle
- Jonesy, a character in the TV series Letterkenny
- Evan 'Jonesy' Jones, in the Australian police drama series Blue Heelers
- Gary Ambrose 'Jonesy' Jones of the Stephen King book Dreamcatcher and the film Dreamcatcher
- Jonesy Hecht, in the musical film All That Jazz
- Jonesy Garcia, in the Canadian animated sitcom 6teen
- Officer Jones (nicknamed Jonesy), in The Flash TV series
- Jonesy (fictional cat), the ship's cat in the film Alien
- Agent John 'Jonesy' Jones, and his snapshots (alternate versions) in the game Fortnite Battle Royale and Fortnite: Save the World
- Sonar Technician 1st Class Ronald "Jonesy" Jones, USN, in the film The Hunt for Red October
- Paul Young, also known as "Jonesy" from the movie, Last of the Grads (2021)
- Indiana Jones, title character of Indiana Jones media franchise, born Henry Walton Jones Jr. and occasionally called "Jonesy" by his companion George "Mac" McHale

== See also ==
- Jones (disambiguation)
