= Aliens: Fireteam Elite 2 =

- Developer: Cold Iron Studios
- Publisher: Daybreak Game Company
- Director: Chris Cross
- Composer: Austin Wintory
- Series: Alien
- Engine: Unreal Engine 4
- Platforms: Windows; Nintendo Switch 2; PlayStation 5; Xbox Series X/S
- Release: PC, PS5, Xbox Series X/S; August 25, 2026; Switch 2 Early 2027
- Genre: Third-person shooter
- Modes: Single-player, multiplayer

Aliens: Fireteam Elite 2 is a third-person shooter developed by Cold Iron Studios and published by Daybreak Game Company. A sequel to Aliens: Fireteam Elite (2021), the game was released for Windows, PlayStation 5, and Xbox Series X and Series S in August 2026. A Nintendo Switch 2 version is set to release in early 2027.

== Gameplay ==
Like its predecessor, Aliens: Fireteam Elite 2 is a third-person shooter. In the game, the player assumes control of a Colonial Marine who must explore the Storr Boon's Mining Facility on the planet LV-558 while fighting against a wide variety of enemies ranging from Xenomorphs to hostile synthetic androids. In each mission, the player is accompanied by three allies who can be controlled by another player or by an AI. Throughout the game's 15 missions, players will explore four different biomes, each with its own environmental features. Gameplay parameters can be adjusted using "Challenge Cards", which can introduce both gameplay perks and debuffs. The game also features a separate horde mode. At launch, the game will support cross-platform play and voice chat.

Before each mission, players can explore the spaceship the USS Endeavor where they can purchase new items from vendors and customize their player avatar. Players can choose one from several character classes: Duelist, Machinist, Marauder, Hunter, Medic. Each class has its own unique skill. For instance, the Hunter class can place electric traps to slow down enemies, and the Machinist can deploy stationary turrets. A sixth class, Specialist, allows players to mix skills from different classes together for a more versatile character build. Fireteam Elite 2 also added four elemental ammo types: fire, cyro, electric, and piercing, with each targeting the weaknesses of different enemies. Players can wield three weapons at a time: a primary weapon, a sidearm with infinite ammo, and a Signature weapon such as smart guns, flamethrowers, and rocket launchers. Each weapon can be further customized with attachments and traits.

== Development ==
After reviewing player feedback on the original Fireteam Elite, the team at Cold Iron Studios decided to introduce a fourth playable character. They felt a fourth character opened up more gameplay opportunities, particularly for players to combine abilities. Its implementation was described by the team as a "constant challenge" as they needed to manage the "attention economy" of each player since there were four times the amount of assets and enemies in the game. To increase cooperation between players, the team also added the Specialist class which introduce additional flexibility for coordination. Several quality-of-life features, such as the ability to crouch, were added, as friendly fire is enabled in higher difficulty levels. It also worked closely with 20th Century Studios to create designs for new alien types in the game. According to director Chris Cross, Fireteam Elite 2 had a larger emphasis on its narrative when compared with its predecessor, adding that it had "an actual throughline with the story".

In 2023, Cold Iron Studios announced that they were developing a new project that would build on the "success of Aliens: Fireteam Elite". Details of the game, then codenamed "Project Macondo", were leaked in July 2024. Cold Iron Studios and publisher Daybreak Game Company officially announced the game on May 16, 2026. The game is set to be released for Windows, PlayStation 5, Xbox Series X and Series S on August 25, 2026. A Nintendo Switch 2 version was set to release on September 29, 2026, but was delayed to early 2027. At launch, players can also purchase downloadable content packs which includes costumes and weapons inspired by Ellen Ripley, Herk Mondo, and Rain Carradine.

== Reception ==
Fireteam Elite 2 received "mixed or average" reviews upon release, according to Metacritic.
