= Alien: Covenant (soundtrack) =

2017 film soundtrack album

Alien: Covenant (Original Soundtrack Album)

Soundtrack album by Jed Kurzel
- Released: May 19, 2017
- Studios: Abbey Road Studios, Air Lyndhurst Studios
- Genre: Film score
- Length: 58:57
- Labels: Milan; Fox Music
- Producer: Jed Kurzel

Jed Kurzel chronology
Assassin's Creed (2016)	Alien: Covenant (Original Soundtrack Album) (2017)	Jupiter's Moon (2018)

Professional ratings
Review scores
Source	Rating
Allmusic	3.5/5 stars

Alien: Covenant (Original Soundtrack Album) is a soundtrack album for the 2017 science fiction film, Alien: Covenant, composed by Jed Kurzel. It was released on May 19, 2017, by Milan Records and Fox Music. A vinyl pressing of the soundtrack was released on July 7, 2017.

== Background ==
In February 2016, Harry Gregson-Williams confirmed that he will be scoring Alien: Covenant. Gregson-Williams had previously collaborated with director Ridley Scott on Kingdom of Heaven (2005) and Prometheus (2012). However, in November 2016, Gregson-Williams revealed that he was no longer attached to the film.

Upon the release of the film's first trailer, it was revealed that Australian musician and composer Jed Kurzel would take over composing duties. "When I first met Ridley, we talked a lot about these organic-sounding instruments being corrupted either by foreign sounds or from within themselves," said Kurzel on his writing process. "Even within the more lush orchestral pieces there are elements suggesting a threatening presence, like breaths and pulses."

The Alien: Covenant score makes extensive use of Jerry Goldsmith's main title from the Alien soundtrack and also quotes the tracks "Life" and "We Were Right" from Gregson-Williams' Prometheus score.

== Critical notes ==
Mihnea Manduteanu of Soundtrack Dreams noted "“Alien” is a franchise that's dear to many and has been around since forever; everybody has an idea about how the movie should be and especially how the music should sound and when the precedent scores where written by people like Jerry Goldsmith or James Horner the expectations and tempers are high. Luckily Jed Kurzel is a guy who knows his worth and his hands were not shaking on this one. He brought his own dark and discreet sound and stitched the iconic Jerry theme in it. The “Alien” theme appears for the first time in “The covenant” and man it sounds gorgeous. That unforgettable ping and that frightening pulse have haunted me for years and I was glad to hear them again. They recur during this score and the movie in all the right places and do a great job of connecting this film and score to the history."

James Southall of Movie Wave wrote "...I'm pleased to say that Alien: Covenant is an infinitely more accomplished piece of work than the composer's previous effort. It's by no means an easy listen, but this is an Alien movie so one shouldn't expect it to be – it's a very effective piece of work that straddles two styles, summed up by the opening two cues."

Rob Wacey of Allmusic stated "While incorporating elements of familiar scores, Kurzel also brings a fresh layer to the palette, with the occasional thudding of electro-bass and subdued kick drums that ring out through continuous reverb, swallowing up the mix as foreboding strings cut in and out."

== Track listing ==
All music is composed by Jed Kurzel.

No.	Title	Length
1.	"Incubation"	1:07
2.	"The Covenant"	3:25
3.	"Neutrino Burst"	2:57
4.	"A Cabin on the Lake"	1:55
5.	"Sails"	3:18
6.	"Planet 4 / Main Theme"	2:06
7.	"Launcher Landing"	1:19
8.	"Wheat Field"	1:39
9.	"Spores"	2:17
10.	"The Med Bay"	7:25
11.	"Grass Attack"	3:16
12.	"Dead Civilization"	2:51
13.	"Survivors"	1:35
14.	"Payload Deployment"	1:46
15.	"Command Override"	1:47
16.	"Face Hugger"	3:56
17.	"Chest Burster"	1:24
18.	"Lonely Perfection"	3:21
19.	"Cargo Lift"	4:44
20.	"Bring It to My Turf"	2:05
21.	"Terraforming Bay"	3:02
22.	"Alien Covenant [sic] Theme"	1:42
Total length:		58:57

== Charts ==
Chart (2017)	Peak position
Belgian Albums (Ultratop Flanders)	198
