= TED 2023 =

2012 American short film

- Directed by: Luke Scott
- Written by: Ridley Scott; Damon Lindelof
- Based on: Prometheus by: Jon Spaihts; Damon Lindelof; Ridley Scott
- Produced by: Ridley Scott; Damon Lindelof
- Starring: Guy Pearce
- Production companies: RSA Films; 20th Century Fox
- Release dates: February 28, 2012 (3 minutes); October 9, 2012 (7 minutes)
- Running time: 7 minutes (October 9, 2012); 3 minutes (February 28, 2012)
- Country: United States

TED 2023, also known as Thus Spoke Zarathustra, The Peter Weyland Files: TED Conference, 2023 and Peter Weyland's 2023 TED Talk, is a short film based on the science fiction action media franchise Alien. Released in parts from February 28 and June 11 to October 9, 2012, as promotion for the franchise's fifth film, Prometheus, the film was directed by Luke Scott and written by Ridley Scott and Damon Lindelof, through RSA Films and 20th Century Fox. Starring Guy Pearce as Peter Weyland, the film follows the CEO as he delivers a speech about his vision for the future at the 2023 TED Conference. The film depicts the character's narration of the Prometheus tale from classical mythology and the intended apotheosis of humanity. It streamed on YouTube on October 7, 2012.

The first short film in the Alien franchise, it received a generally positive critical reception on its initial release, and further positive appraisal in 2023 for perceived comparisons between Pearce's portrayal of Weyland and the controversies of Elon Musk.

== Plot ==
In 2023, almost a century before the events of Alien (1979), and almost seventy years before the events of Prometheus (2012), famous entrepreneur/inventor and the founder of the latest form of the Weyland Corporation, Sir Peter Weyland, gives an influential talk at the annual 2023 TED conference in Wembley Stadium after having a glass of whiskey. After quoting Lawrence of Arabia, Weyland lists humankind's major technological breakthroughs before a captivated audience, he lays out the company's ambitious plans for the future, stressing the tale of Prometheus and apotheosis of man in his talk.

== Production ==
As a part of the viral marketing for the 2012 science fiction film Prometheus, several short films revolving around the film's characters in the years preceding the events of the film were released, the first of which, TED 2023, would star Guy Pearce as Peter Weyland, following him delivering a speech about his vision for the future at a futuristic vision of a TED conference, an annual technology and design event held in Long Beach, California, in 2023. The segment was conceived and designed by Ridley Scott and Damon Lindelof, and directed by Scott's son, Luke. The production was made in collaboration with, and made available through TED because Lindelof wanted to introduce new audiences to the conference itself, having felt "it would be really cool to have one of the characters from the movie give a TED Talk". Lindelof said that the scene takes place in a futuristic stadium because "a guy like Peter Weyland—whose ego is just massive, and the ideas that he's advancing are nothing short of hubris—that he'd basically say to TED, 'If you want me to give a talk, I'm giving it in Wembley Stadium.'"

TED community director Tom Rielly helped the film's producers gain approval for the use of the TED brand, which had not previously been used for promotional purposes. Rielly was involved in designing the 2023 conference, and said that the association generated millions of unique visits to the TED website. The video's release was accompanied by a fictional TED blog about the 2023 conference and a tie-in website for the fictional Weyland Corporation.

== Release ==
TED 2023 was first released on February 28, 2012 as Peter Weyland's 2023 TED Talk (titled onscreen as TED 2023), running three minutes long. A three-minute precursor, Thus Spoke Zarathustra, was made available via an easter egg link to the website "Whatis101112.com" in the closing credits of Prometheus, released on June 11, 2012. An extended seven-minute version of the film (melding both segments together), The Peter Weyland Files: TED Conference, 2023 (again titled onscreen as TED 2023), was released with the Blu-ray disc and DVD release of Prometheus on October 9, 2012.

== Online game ==
On March 6, 2012, the Weyland website was updated to allow visitors to "invest" in TED 2023 as part of an online game, which would reveal new media in promotion of Prometheus.

== Reception ==
Matt Goldberg of Collider complimented TED 2023 as "a clever and captivating piece of viral marketing [which] makes me want a spin-off featuring just [Peter] Weyland", while lauding Guy Pearce's "hypnotic [performance] as the ambitious, eloquent, and somewhat terrifying CEO", while Jordan Raup of The Film Stage praised the film as "a breath of fresh air" compared to "so many [other] viral campaigns seemingly going through the motions".

In a 2023 retrospective, Toussaint Egan of Polygon called TED 2023 as "weird premonition in itself", noting it as "just one example of how the inexorable march of time has eclipsed the wildest prognostications of speculative fiction [with] the most interesting thing about the video [being] not its thematic or narrative relationship to Prometheus, but how it stands as an inadvertent time capsule of a moment in our collective culture when tech CEOs were, as a whole, held in a much higher regard", in particular in comparison to Elon Musk, "Silicon Valley's wealthiest pariah", who is noted like Pearce's portrayal of Peter Weyland as "a man who wants to do whatever he wants, and [to] be adored for being the guy who can do whatever he wants", before concluding to call the film "a fascinating touchstone of sci-fi popular culture and Hollywood ephemera [that is] more than worth revisiting, if not to put into stark relief the ways in which our collective culture's depiction of tech CEOs has or has not evolved, then just to see Guy Pearce hamming it up as Weyland in all his vainglorious glory".
