= Jones (fictional cat) =

Alien franchise character

- Alien character
- Jones in the arms of Ellen Ripley
- First appearance: Alien (1979)

In-universe information
- Species: Cat
- Gender: Male
- Occupation: Ship's cat

Jones, commonly known as Jonesy, is a fictional ginger American Shorthair cat from the Alien franchise. He is the ship's cat on the Nostromo, the setting of the first film of the franchise. In Alien, Jones was portrayed by four lookalike cat actors.

== Character biography ==
=== In Alien ===
Jones's small size allowed him to comfortably share a hypersleep capsule with one of the crew members during the Nostromo's long journeys. When the Alien began stalking the ship's occupants, Jones was apparently of little interest to the creature (most likely because his biology made him unsuitable for reproduction) and he survived the incident unscathed; however, he was inadvertently responsible for Brett's death. When the crew deployed motion trackers to locate the Alien, they detected and found Jones instead, who fled upon discovery. Brett was tasked with recovering and securing him; in the process, the Alien ambushed Brett and Jones watched as the Alien dragged Brett's body into the air shafts. Ellen Ripley later found Jones and put him in a carry case. At one point, Ripley was forced to abandon Jones to the Alien, but, while the Xenomorph was notably distracted by the cat, it did not attack him. Jones was later recovered and put in hypersleep aboard the Narcissus after escaping with Ripley.

=== In Aliens ===
Jones is rescued along with Ripley, but remains behind when she travels with the Marines to investigate the colony. After featuring in a nightmare sequence, he plays no further part in the story.

=== In books ===
Anne Billson's compilation Cats on Film includes her short story My Day by Jones: A Cat's Eye View of an Alien. Jones is also the protagonist of a book adaptation of Alien titled Jonesy: Nine Lives on the Nostromo. Jones is mentioned in Alien: Out of the Shadows but is kept safely out of harm's way.

== Reception ==
Jones has been described as "one of the most beloved cats in horror cinema" and "one of the most famous felines of the screen" by Screen Rant and Film School Rejects respectively. Jones has been called "the true hero of Alien" due to his characterization as a survivor who teaches the human characters of the film valuable lessons. He is also appreciated by fans as he is the only significant character in the franchise that has lived a full and long life, having survived facing the Alien on multiple occasions. Insider listed Jones as one of the top 15 best movie cats of all time, calling him a "survivor". The website Collider has also listed him as one of the best cats in cinema, as well as one of the best animal sidekicks in horror.
