= Aliens: Dark Descent =

2023 real time strategy video game

- Developer: Tindalos Interactive
- Publisher: Focus Entertainment
- Director: Romain Clavier
- Producers: Hippolyte Simon; Léo Millot; Ugo Ribaud
- Designers: Tristan Clavier; Clément Seurat
- Programmer: Dimitri Chambonneau
- Artists: Edouard Boccard; Sergey Kritskiy
- Writers: Matthew Ward; Thibault Claudel
- Composer: Doyle W. Donehoo
- Series: Alien
- Engine: Unreal Engine
- Platforms: PlayStation 4; PlayStation 5; Windows; Xbox One; Xbox Series X/S
- Release: June 20, 2023
- Genre: Real-time tactics
- Mode: Single-player

Aliens: Dark Descent is a real-time tactics horror video game developed by Tindalos Interactive in collaboration with 20th Century Games and published by Focus Entertainment. Set in the Alien universe, the game was released for PlayStation 4, PlayStation 5, Windows, Xbox One, and Xbox Series X/S on June 20, 2023. It received generally positive reviews from critics.

== Gameplay ==
In the game, players must issue commands to a squad of four colonial marines as they battle both Xenomorphs and rogue agents.

The Dark Descent story is set in the year 2198, 19 years after the events of the original trilogy films. It is a real-time tactics video game played from a top-down perspective. Players need to issue commands to a squad of four colonial marines, who must battle the Xenomorphs and rogue agents from the Weyland-Yutani Corporation. The game features five starting character classes, each with their own unique weapons and abilities. While combat happens in real time, players can briefly slow time to a crawl in order to issue commands or set up an ambush. Players are encouraged to explore the moon station, discovering short cuts and deploying motion trackers which allows players to track alien movements. They can also use a welder to open locked doors, and can weld doors shut as they retreat from one room to another. The changes to level layout are permanent. Welding a door may stop the Xenomorphs from advancing, but it may also block the player's route in subsequent visits.

Between missions, players can upgrade and customize their marines. Players need to maintain not only the physical health but also the mental health of these characters. Each character has their own mental traits. Their combat performance may be affected if they were put under too much strain. They may miss their shots, behave irrationally, or even sabotage the player's mission. Squad members may die permanently after being attacked. Players can evacuate during a mission to prevent losing the entire squad. According to the developer, each mission in the game lasts "anywhere between 20 minutes and an hour".

== Story ==
In the year 2198, on the moon of Lethe, the USS Otago prepares for a shakedown. Meanwhile, at Pioneer Station, a shuttle, the Bentonville, drops off cargo. A mysterious infiltrator releases its contents: deadly Xenomorph aliens, which begin to massacre the crew. Noticing Bentonville's cargo weight discrepancy, Deputy Administrator Maeko Hayes recommends the ship be detained but her supervisor McDonald refuses. Hayes encounters the aliens in the docking bay, trying to weld the doors shut. As the shuttle leaves, McDonald and the control staff are attacked and impregnated by Facehuggers. Narrowly escaping, Hayes realizes more Xenomorphs are in Bentonville's remaining cargo and reluctantly activates the Cerberus Protocol, a Weyland-Yutani planetary quarantine procedure using armed satellites. Bentonville and a freighter, Baldrin, are destroyed with all hands while the Otago is crippled. Hayes is extracted by Sgt. Jonas Harper and his squad of Colonial Marines to the crash-landed Otago, where he takes command and deputizes Hayes as his Intelligence officer. The Marines enter the Dead Hills settlement, killing a Xenomorph Queen under the colony. After scouting the Berkley's Docks spaceport for parts to repair the Otago, the Marines encounter the Darwin Era, an anti-Weyland-Yutani cult who revere the Xenomorphs as a higher stage of evolution. Upon returning, Hayes admits to Harper that she activated Cerberus; despite this, they continue to work together. Hayes also works with chief medical officer Bookard, Weyland-Yutani xenobiologist Becker, chief engineer Corrigan, ship psychologist Kabiri, and armory head Sgt. Martinez to find materials and personnel in the field to bring to Otago.

Harper traces the origin of the Xenomorph containers to Olduvai, Lethe's main Trimonite refinery. In its mines, they encounter Guardians: modified cultists containing Chestbursters in their bodies who are ignored by the Xenomorphs along with discovering the cult is taking people to the Cassandra Project. Harper briefly reminisces on this "Cassandra", before Joseph Marlow, Darwin Era's leader and a former Weyland-Yutani scientist, addresses the Marines directly, implying that Cassandra is working with him. Hayes, originally planning to use the Otago's last escape pod as a beacon to send out a distress call, instead uses it as an improvised missile to rescue the Marines just before they are overrun. Returning to the Otago, Harper discloses to Hayes that Cassandra is his daughter from his time on Lethe, as he was born on the planet. The Otago is directly attacked by Xenomorphs, but the Marines fight them off; Harper, who gets painful flashes and visions when Xenomorphs are nearby, begins to fall ill. Director Barbara Pryce, Weyland-Yutani's head of operations on Lethe, contacts the Marines and informs them that Cerberus is entering Phase 2: full nuclear sterilization of Lethe. The Marines storm Pioneer to try to stop Cerberus and kill another Queen, but it is too late to stop Cerberus. With little time, the Marines rush to repair Otago's hull, hypersleep chambers, and boost power to its energy shield to break the blockade. Pryce offers an atmospheric processor's power core, as well as looking for Cassandra and rescuing her from Marlow, in exchange for being allowed access to Otago.

The Marines raid the processor, stealing its core, killing another Queen, and recovering an APC, but Harper steadily weakens. The Marines then salvage a hypersleep gas-mixer chip from the USCSS Monterro, an old M-class vessel used during a prior rebellion against Weyland-Yutani for which Harper was present. A Guardian sneaks onboard Otago to persuade Harper to join Darwin Era, revealing that Marlow is using Cassandra for a project allowing communication with the Xenomorphs using her innate telepathic connection to the alien's hivemind, a trait that Harper shares with her and is the cause of his visions and failing health, before the Chestburster erupts from him and kills him. Harper confronts Pryce, who has dispatched men to find Cassandra, led by former Marine Theo Stern, in the Tantalus underground laboratory but Pryce had lost contact with them. The Marines infiltrate the lab and recover Stern, who joins the Marines, but they find from old footage that Cassandra has already been moved elsewhere to a new location and they narrowly escape the lab's self-destruct. During the escape, they capture Marlow who divulges that Pryce is playing them; she destroyed Tantalus and left Stern to die to tie up loose ends. Unable to get Cassandra's location from Marlow, Harper kills him after discovering that it is a Synth recreation of the real Marlow, before falling unconscious.

Meanwhile, back on Otago, Becker, working with Pryce to erase his debts to the company, cripples the ship's defenses and releases a Xenomorph Warrior that emerged from the captured Guardian, which kills Bookard while Weyland-Yutani commandos arrive to capture the ship. Hayes narrowly fends off the mercenaries with the ARC, though it is ruined by the commandos gunship; Becker gets the drop on her and holds her at gunpoint, but is killed by the Xenomorph. Hayes manages to lure the Xenomorph into the ship's reactor when it restarts, frying it and securing the ship. With Harper in critical condition and Kabiri unable to effectively treat him without Bookard, Stern and Hayes storm Pharos Spire, Weyland-Yutani's headquarters on Lethe, to extract Marlow's location from Pryce. She divulges that Marlow had set up in an ancient alien city under Olduvai, which is where he is keeping Cassandra prisoner and desperately tries to bribe Hayes to take her with them. Disgusted, Hayes renounces Pryce as less human than a Synth and leaves her to die. As Pryce furiously states she is human, Xenomorphs begin to swarm the facility.

As Cerberus prepares to launch Phase 2, Hayes, determined to atone for serving Weyland-Yutani, decides to raid Marlow's city and save Cassandra. The now-repaired Otago takes to the air and the Marines launch an all-out assault on the mine, killing a Queen and many cultists. Hayes, Martinez, and Stern descend to and enter the underground city, which contains mummified remains of a giant, wormlike alien species and large Xenomorph eggs. They also discover the corpse of the real Marlow, who had died from a chestburster long ago, and countless non-hostile Marlow Synths he had created to continue his work on the Cassandra Project. Finding Cassandra and freeing her, a gargantuan Xenomorph made from one of the ancient aliens wakes up, killing Stern and Martinez. The women are cornered, but Harper uses the last of his strength to briefly immobilize the Xenomorph, allowing them to escape at the cost of his own life. The remaining Marines stay behind to hold off the endless swarming Xenomorphs while Hayes and Cassandra extract to Otago as the nuclear missiles start to fall. Otago's shields hold; the ship breaks the blockade and leaves Lethe's orbit. After mourning Harper, Hayes, Cassandra, and the remaining crew enter hypersleep as the Otago enters deep space.

== Development ==
Dark Descent is developed by French studio Tindalos Interactive, which had previously developed the Battlefleet Gothic: Armada series of real-time strategy video game. According to managing director John Bert, the game was inspired by both tactical and computer role-playing games. The game was announced during Summer Game Fest in June 2022. It was released for PlayStation 4, PlayStation 5, Windows, Xbox One and Xbox Series X/S on June 20, 2023.

== Reception ==
Reception

Aggregate scores
Aggregator	Score
Metacritic	(PC) 75/100 (PS5) 76/100 (XSX) 80/100
OpenCritic	62% recommend

Review scores
Publication	Score
Eurogamer	3/5
Famitsu	31/40
Game Informer	8/10
GamesRadar+	3.5/5
Hardcore Gamer	4/5
IGN	7/10
PC Gamer (US)	84/100
Push Square	8/10
Shacknews	7/10
TechRadar	3/5

Aliens: Dark Descent received "generally favorable" reviews, according to review aggregator Metacritic. Fellow review aggregator OpenCritic assessed that the game received strong approval, being recommended by 62% of critics. In Japan, four critics from Famitsu gave the game a total score of 31 out of 40.

Rock Paper Shotgun praised how the game recreated the atmosphere of Aliens, using elements of the franchise to help build tension, "It's the first to really capture the white-knuckle vibe of setting up perimeters, quipping out that last line of top-tier banter you've been saving, and seeing the shapes on the motion tracker creep closer and squeal louder". Eurogamer felt that the game didn't do anything to distinguish itself from other games inspired by XCOM: Enemy Unknown, "Descent doesn't introduce any memorable mechanics or stylistic flourishes at the campaign level. It's as spare and utilitarian as the boxy grey architecture of the Otago itself". While enjoying the Onslaught mechanic for increasing tension, IGN criticized the technical state of the game, writing, "These issues are just a bit too frequent and a bit too game-breaking for me to look the other way".

GamesRadar+ thought the game added interesting, unique flourishes to the tactical game formula, especially the safe room mechanic, "It's a brilliant and original feature that makes you stop and consider your squad of toughs as a little more human than just walking guns". Game Informer disliked the game's controls, "Unfortunately, stealth sections through packs of sleeping Xenomorphs make squad movement feel cumbersome. And at times, crouching and clicking other buttons aren't snappy, leading to deadly encounters with enemies". PC Gamer liked the increasing infestation that progressed each day, saying that it made the player make hard choices, "It's a fascinating mixture of ideas that creates tons of emergent conundrums".
