= Music of Assassin's Creed =

Video game franchise soundtrack album list

The Assassin's Creed video game franchise has generated several soundtrack albums. Danish composer Jesper Kyd composed the soundtrack albums for the first three games in the series and the twelfth game, while others has composed for the other games.

== Assassin's Creed (2007) ==
Jade Raymond, the producer of Assassin's Creed, said: "For Assassin's Creed we wanted the score to capture the gruesome atmosphere of medieval warfare but also be edgy and contemporary." The musical score was composed by Jesper Kyd in 2007. Six tracks were made available online to those who have purchased the game; a password was given to people to insert at the soundtrack section of the Ubisoft website. The soundtrack is available from various online music stores. Several tracks are also available on Kyd's MySpace, his official website, and his YouTube channel. The released tracks have the archaic Latin chorus and dark orchestral music, while "Meditation Begins" features a kind of Saltarello with a very ominous, dark, ambient overtone with men whispering in Latin. The atmosphere in these tracks is what Jesper Kyd is known for and is effective in situ.

Assassin's Creed Soundtrack (Note: While the song "The Chosen (Assassin's Creed)" by Intwine featuring Brainpower was made contributing to the game, it was not featured in the game nor its soundtrack. Other songs used in previews and trailers, such as "Teardrop" by Massive Attack and "Lonely Soul" by UNKLE, are also not present on the soundtrack.)
No.	Title	Length
1.	"City of Jerusalem"	3:11
2.	"Flight Through Jerusalem"	3:39
3.	"Spirit of Damascus"	1:31
4.	"Trouble in Jerusalem"	4:04
5.	"Acre Underworld"	3:24
6.	"Access the Animus"	9:34
7.	"Dunes of Death"	1:46
8.	"Masyaf in Danger"	3:43
9.	"Meditation Begins"	2:47
10.	"Meditation of the Assassin"	3:43
11.	"The Bureau"	3:12

== Assassin's Creed II ==
The score to Assassin's Creed II was composed by Kyd. It was recorded at Capitol Records with a 35-piece string ensemble and 13-person choir, with featured vocals by Melissa Kaplan. A soundtrack was released via download on November 16, 2009. 14 tracks of the soundtrack were also released on the game disc available with the special pre-order Black edition of Assassin's Creed II.

In the marketing, "Genesis" by Justice was used in the "Visions of Venice" trailer.

== Assassin's Creed Brotherhood ==
Assassin's Creed Brotherhood (Original Game Soundtrack)

Soundtrack album by Jesper Kyd
- Released: November 16, 2010
- Genre: Video game soundtrack
- Producer: Ubisoft Music

The music in Assassin's Creed: Brotherhood was composed by Jesper Kyd, who created the scores to previous Assassin's Creed games. The soundtrack was released digitally on November 16, 2010. A physical CD-DA release of the soundtrack accompanied selected retail editions. However, the track-listing is altered from the digital release — the CD has 22 tracks, including 3 exclusive pieces, but is missing "Apple Chamber" present in the digital release.

Assassin's Creed Brotherhood (Original Game Soundtrack)
No.	Title	Length
1.	"Master Assassin"	3:21
2.	"City of Rome"	5:32
3.	"Cesare Borgia"	2:21
4.	"Flags of Rome"	2:36
5.	"The Brotherhood Escapes"	1:58
6.	"Brotherhood of the Assassins"	3:03
7.	"The Pantheon"	3:06
8.	"Villa Under Attack"	2:13
9.	"Echoes of the Roman Ruins"	2:51
10.	"Borgia Tower"	2:14
11.	"Borgia Occupation"	3:02
12.	"Roman Underworld"	3:46
13.	"Countdown"	3:30
14.	"Borgia — The Rulers of Rome"	3:57
15.	"Ezio Confronts Lucrezia"	2:56
16.	"Battle in Spain"	1:39
17.	"Fight of the Assassins"	2:38
18.	"Desmond Miles"	4:41
19.	"VR Room"	2:43
20.	"Apple Chamber"	4:55

Assassin's Creed: Brotherhood [Codex Edition/Collector's Edition] – Game Soundtrack
No.	Title	Length
1.	"Borgia Occupation"	3:03
2.	"Master Assassin"	3:20
3.	"Cesare Borgia" (Extended from the digital release)	3:01
4.	"Infiltrating the Borgia Castle" (Flags of Rome in the digital release)	2:36
5.	"City of Rome"	5:33
6.	"The Brotherhood Escapes"	2:03
7.	"Brotherhood of the Assassins"	3:03
8.	"The Pantheon"	3:05
9.	"Villa Under Attack"	2:13
10.	"Echoes of the Roman Ruins"	2:52
11.	"Rome Countryside"	3:01
12.	"Borgia Tower"	2:13
13.	"Roman Underworld"	3:45
14.	"Countdown"	3:34
15.	"Borgia — The Rulers of Rome"	4:00
16.	"Ezio Confronts Lucrezia"	2:58
17.	"Legacy of the Borgia Family"	2:31
18.	"Battle in Spain"	1:36
19.	"Fight of the Assassins"	2:37
20.	"Desmond Miles"	4:47
21.	"VR Room"	2:49
22.	"End Fight (AC2 Bonus Track)"	1:37

== Assassin's Creed III ==
The score to Assassin's Creed III was composed by Scottish composer Lorne Balfe, who previously co-composed the soundtrack of Assassin's Creed: Revelations with longtime Assassin's Creed series composer Jesper Kyd. The game's soundtrack is the first soundtrack of the series' main games to not feature Kyd. The soundtrack was released via digital download on October 30, 2012.

== Assassin's Creed IV: Black Flag ==
Assassin's Creed IV: Black Flag (Original Game Soundtrack)

Soundtrack album by Brian Tyler
- Released: October 16, 2013
- Genre: Video game soundtrack
- Length: 2:01:33
- Label: Ubisoft Music

The soundtrack for Assassin's Creed IV: Black Flag was composed by American composer Brian Tyler, who also composed the soundtrack of the previous Ubisoft title Far Cry 3. Additional compositions and arrangements were provided by Sarah Schachner, Omar Fadel, Steve Davis, Mike Kramer, Jeremy Lamb, Matthew Llewellyn, and Robert Lydecker. The soundtrack was released on Amazon MP3 and iTunes on October 14, 2013. Two other soundtracks have also been released:

- Assassin's Creed IV: Black Flag (Game Soundtrack — Sea Shanty Edition), a second soundtrack containing a set of 16 sea shanties composed by various artists, was released on Amazon MP3 and iTunes on October 29, 2013.
- Assassin's Creed IV: Black Flag (Game Soundtrack — The Complete Edition), a complete soundtrack including the two previous soundtracks as well as the multiplayer soundtrack composed by Joe Henson and Alexis Smith, was released on Amazon MP3 and iTunes on December 2, 2013.
- Assassin's Creed IV: Black Flag (Game Soundtrack — Sea Shanty Edition, Vol. 2), a third soundtrack containing a set of 25 sea shanties composed by various artists, was released on Amazon MP3 and iTunes on June 16, 2014.

The score to the Freedom Cry DLC was composed by French composer Olivier Deriviere. It was recorded at Avatar Studios in New York with La Troupe Makandal, a dedicated group for Haitian music, and at Galaxy Studios in Belgium with the Brussels Philharmonic.

== Assassin's Creed Syndicate ==
The score to Assassin's Creed Syndicate was composed by American composer Austin Wintory. The lyrical songs in the game, murder ballads, were composed by Wintory and Australian musical comedy band, Tripod. The soundtrack was released on Amazon MP3 and iTunes on October 23, 2015. Bear McCreary composed the score for the Jack the Ripper downloadable content, in which a soundtrack album was released on December 1, 2015.

== Assassin's Creed Odyssey ==
The musical duo of Joe Henson and Alexis Smith, collectively known as The Flight, served as the composers for Assassin's Creed Odyssey. The two previously composed the music for the multiplayer portion of Assassin's Creed IV: Black Flag (2013). Since Odyssey is a massive role-playing game, the team described the music composition process as an intimidating challenge, especially since they were not given a lot of time to complete the production of the game's soundtracks. The team listened to Greek and Mediterranean folk music for inspirations, but did not listen to the scores of other games in the series. One exception was "Ezio’s Family," which was present in nearly all games in the series. The team purchased and used dulcimers, lyres, panpipes, and a bouzouki during the recording process to give the music "a strong geographical stamp". Each region featured in the game has its own musical styles. For example, the Athenian homeland utilizes homophonic melodies to elicit a stately, dignified atmosphere which is fitting for the birthplace of democracy. The main theme, "Legend of the Eagle Bearer" was composed in an hour, but battle themes such as the track "On The Battlefield" were more challenging for the team and took more time.

== See also ==
- Assassin's Creed (soundtrack), the soundtrack to the film adaptation
