= Assassin's Creed (soundtrack) =

Assassin's Creed (Original Motion Picture Soundtrack)

Film score by Jed Kurzel
- Released: December 21, 2016
- Genre: Film score
- Length: 66:27
- Label: Verve
- Producer: Jed Kurzel

Jed Kurzel chronology
Macbeth (2015)	Assassin's Creed (2016)	Alien: Covenant (2017)

Assassin's Creed (Original Motion Picture Soundtrack) is the soundtrack to the 2016 film Assassin's Creed directed by Justin Kurzel, based on the video game franchise of the same name. The film featured musical score composed by singer-songwriter Jed Kurzel. The album was released through Verve Music on December 21, 2016.

== Background ==
Initially, Jesper Kyd, who originally scored for the video game franchise, was reported to do the same for the film. But he was ultimately replaced by Justin's brother, composer Jed Kurzel. Assassin's Creed is their third film together. Since Jed has not been familiar with the video game series, the scoring process was more about finding the music appropriate for the film instead of being authentic to the series. The score accompanying the film featured 21 tracks written and produced by Jed and was released through Verve Music on December 21.

== Reception ==
Tim Grierson, writing for Screen International, summarized that Jed's music accompanied with the cinematography of Adam Arkapaw "give Assassin’s Creed a brooding grandeur". Anton Smit of Soundtrack World wrote "The movie and score sadly do not get high praise here. But not all is bad in the Assassin’s Creed world." Harry Windsor of The Hollywood Reporter wrote "composer Jed Kurzel capably steps into the blockbuster frame with a nicely hurtling score, traditional for the 15th century and electronic for this one until they begin to overlap, as the modern Assassins shake off their shackles for a franchise-bait ending that’s all too abrupt." Rob Leane of Den of Geek wrote "Jed Kurzel’s memorable score – chockfull of pulsing drums – heightens these thrilling scenes even further."

David Ehrlich of IndieWire described the score as "haunting" and felt that it "sounds closer to Tim Hecker than it does Hans Zimmer". Elena Lazic of Little White Lies called it an "astonishing" score that "lends a pulsating, often breathlessly exciting feel to proceedings. The loud, percussive soundtrack elevates the material and hints at what could have been: an epic personal and historical journey through time and space with repercussions for the whole of humanity." Chris Bumbray of JoBlo.com described it as a "thundering" score. Rashid Irani of Hindustan Times wrote that "the wall-to-wall background score by the director’s younger brother, Jed Kurzel, is importunate."

== Track listing ==
Assassin's Creed (Original Motion Picture Soundtrack) track listing
No.	Title	Length
1.	"Young Cal"	2:38
2.	"The Execution"	2:40
3.	"Abstergo"	4:18
4.	"The Animus"	4:41
5.	"First Regression"	4:13
6.	"Cal Recuperates"	1:25
7.	"The Cure for Violence"	1:54
8.	"The Bleeding Effect"	2:25
9.	"Research Room"	3:33
10.	"Second Regression"	3:42
11.	"Underground"	2:27
12.	"The Creed"	4:07
13.	"The Apple"	3:42
14.	"Columbus"	2:11
15.	"You're Not Alone"	5:52
16.	"The Mutiny"	1:24
17.	"Leap of Faith"	1:40
18.	"Seville"	6:28
19.	"The Assassinations"	1:25
20.	"Future Glory"	2:21
21.	"He Says He Needs Me (3D and Young Fathers)"	3:21
Total length:		66:27

== Charts ==
Chart performance for Assassin's Creed (Original Motion Picture Soundtrack)
Chart (2017)	Peak position
UK Soundtrack Albums (OCC)	27

== See also ==
- Music of Assassin's Creed
