= Colonial Marines =

Colonial Marines may refer to:

== Military ==
- American colonial marines, Patriot naval infantry consisting of militiamen which served in various units during the American Revolutionary War
- Continental Marines, the naval infantry corps of the Continental Navy during the American Revolutionary War
- Corps of Colonial Marines, two British military units made up of freed American slaves which fought during the War of 1812
- Troupes de marine, a corps of the French Army intended for amphibious and overseas operations

== Fiction ==
- Colonial Marine Corps (Battlestar Galactica), a fictional military organization in the Battlestar Galactica fictional universe

=== Alien franchise ===
Alien (Xenomorph/Space-Jockey) fictional universe

- United States Colonial Marines (Aliens), a fictional military organization
- Aliens: Colonial Marines Technical Manual, a 1995 guide to the fictional United States Colonial Marines depicted in the 1986 film Aliens
- Aliens: Colonial Marines (cancelled video game), a cancelled 2002 PlayStation 2 video game by Fox Interactive and Electronic Arts
- Aliens: Colonial Marines, a 2013 video game developed by Gearbox Software

== See also ==
- Colonial (disambiguation)
- Marine (disambiguation)
