= Alien Resurrection (soundtrack) =

1997 film soundtrack

Alien Resurrection: Complete Motion Picture Score

Soundtrack album by John Frizzell
- Released: November 11, 1997
- Genre: Soundtrack
- Length: 45:13
- Label: RCA Records 09026 68955 2
- Producers: John Frizzell, Mark Cross

Professional ratings
Review scores
Source	Rating
Allmusic	4/5 stars
Soundtrack-express	3/5 stars

Alien Resurrection: Complete Motion Picture Score is the official soundtrack album of the 1997 science fiction film Alien Resurrection. Composed by John Frizzell, the soundtrack features themes such as romance and eroticism. Taking seven months to write and record, Frizzell included strange sound elements such as a gong and rub rods, to create a unique score. It was released on November 11, 1997.

== Reviews ==
Steven McDonald of Allmusic thought it was "A dark and stormy score that fits the cold atmosphere of the film perfectly". Awarding it 4 out of 5 stars, McDonald stated that Frizzell occasionally embraced grand, traditional horror film writing, citing the main title as reminiscent of horror scores from the 1960s and 1970s. He also praised the score's blend of orchestra, synthesizers, sampled sounds and choral voices, observing that these elements created striking musical textures through the use of dissonant and jarring sonorities. Although the score incorporated many conventional horror techniques, he concluded that it was an effective release with several particularly interesting moments.

Writing for Assignment X, Daniel Schweiger praised John Frizzell's score as one of the composer's strongest early works, commending its blend of bold orchestral writing and experimental electronic textures. He noted that, after paying tribute to Jerry Goldsmith's original Alien theme, Frizzell developed a distinctive musical identity that captured the conflict between Ripley and the xenomorphs. Schweiger particularly praised the score's intense action writing, describing the brass performances as relentlessly energetic and pushing the orchestra to the brink of anarchy during the film's suspense and escape sequences. He described the score as among the most exciting music composed for a science fiction horror film, and concluded that its energetic orchestration and stylistic fusion successfully combined elements reminiscent of Goldsmith and James Horner while establishing Frizzell's own musical voice.

Writing for BBC Music Magazine, Jonathan Broxton described the score as an ambitious work that anticipated later trends in film scoring by combining large-scale orchestral writing, choir and electronic elements. He praised its richly textured sound world, noting its use of extended orchestral techniques to blur the boundaries between conventional music and sound design, and argued that the score deserved greater recognition. John Fallon of JoBlo.com felt it was "An adequate score that supports its whacked out scenes properly."

Matt Peterson of Track Sounds, however, was negative stating, "it is quite disarrayed and incoherent. The lack of any solid thematic material hurts the viability of this music for the film, and destroys its listening potential on CD." Peterson described it as lacking orchestral depth, thematic development and overall cohesion. He argued that the orchestration sounded thin and was undermined by an overreliance on electronic textures, synthesised effects and conventional horror film devices, including dissonant passages, sudden orchestral crashes and frequent crescendos. Peterson considered "Post-Op" ("Ripley's Theme") to be the score's strongest cue, but felt it was the only memorable theme and was repeated too often throughout the album. He also criticised much of the action music as directionless and lacking clear structure. While acknowledging that the music occasionally complemented the film's atmosphere, Peterson concluded that the score relied on chaotic textures rather than strong craftsmanship.

== Track listing ==
All music is composed by John Frizzell, except as noted.

No.	Title	Length
1.	"Main Title"	2:06
2.	"Post-Op"	1:20
3.	"Docking the Betty"	1:16
4.	"Priva Son D'Ogni Conforto" (composed by George Frideric Handel, sung by Maureen Forrester)	5:27
5.	"Face Huggers"	2:10
6.	"Call Finds Ripley"	3:02
7.	"The Aliens Escape"	4:12
8.	"Ripley Meets Her Clones"	2:19
9.	"What's Inside Purvis?"	2:28
10.	"They Swim..."	6:28
11.	"The Chapel"	2:35
12.	"The Abduction"	3:33
13.	"The Battle with the Newborn"	6:03
14.	"Ripley's Theme"	2:14
Total length:		45:13

== Personnel ==
- John Frizzell – composer, producer
- Artie Kane – conductor
- Patrick Weber – engineer
- Tom Hardisty – engineer (assistance)
- Joe Gastwirt – mastering
- Ramon Breton – mastering
- René Mandel – mastering
- Mark Cross – producer

== Expanded Edition ==
Alien Resurrection: Original Motion Picture Soundtrack

Soundtrack album by John Frizzell
- Released: October 5, 2010
- Genre: Soundtrack
- Length: 2:20:37
- Labels: La-La Land Records LLLCD 1145; Fox Music LLLCD 1145
- Producers: Nick Redman, Michael Matessino, Didier C. Deutsch

La-La Land Records and Fox Music released an expanded limited edition album (catalogue number LLLCD 1145) on October 5, 2010, including the original 1997 release (track 9 onwards on disc 2). The record was limited to 3500 copies. The CD booklet contains exclusive detailed liner notes.

Disc 1

1. Main Title (2:12)
2. Entering the Ship (containing "Main Title (Ripley's Theme)" from Alien, composed by Jerry Goldsmith) (1:21)
3. Post-Op (1:21)
4. Make Us Proud/Meat By-Product (1:58)
5. Fiora 16/Inbred (1:51)
6. Docking the Betty (1:19)
7. Face Huggers (2:11)
8. Basketball/Foot Massage/Fast Learner (3:56)
9. Call Finds Ripley (5:01)
10. Gun Fight (1:17)
11. The Aliens Escape (6:36)
12. Hose/Elgyn's Death/Ripley Believe It (3:57)
13. Twelve/Vriess Reappears/Telling Vriess (4:09)
14. Ripley Meets Her Clones (3:43)
15. After Tube Blow Up (1:18)
16. What's Inside Purvis? (4:25)
17. They Swim... (8:58)
18. Call's Fake (1:47)
19. The Chapel (3:17)
20. Mean Streak (1:42)
21. The Abduction (3:50)
22. Birth of the Newborn (4:52)

Disc 2

1. Call Meets the Newborn (6:09)
2. Ripley and the Newborn (3:14)
3. Finale (1:59)
4. Alien March (End Credits) (3:26)
5. Main Title (alternate) (2:15)
6. Elgyn's Death (alternate) (3:03)
7. Finale (alternate-brass version) (1:58)
8. Finale (alternate #2) (1:51)
9. The Original 1997 Soundtrack Album: Main Title (2:08)
10. Post-Op (1:20)
11. Docking the Betty (1:17)
12. Priva Son D'Ogni Conforto (from Handel's Julius Caesar) – sung by Maureen Forrester (5:28)
13. Face Huggers (2:12)
14. Call Finds Ripley (3:02)
15. The Aliens Escape (4:13)
16. Ripley Meets Her Clones (2:20)
17. What's Inside Purvis? (2:27)
18. They Swim... (6:27)
19. The Chapel (2:35)
20. The Abduction (3:34)
21. The Battle With the Newborn (6:03)
22. Ripley's Theme (2:12)
