= Ash (Alien) =

Alien franchise fictional character

- Alien character
- Ian Holm as Ash in Alien (1979)
- First appearance: Alien (1979)
- Last appearance: Alien: Romulus (2024)
- Created by: Dan O'Bannon; Ronald Shusett
- Portrayed by: Ian Holm
- Voiced by: Dave B. Mitchell (Alien: Isolation); Rutger Hauer (Alien: Out of the Shadows audio play)

In-universe information
- Species: Hyperdyne Systems 120-A/2 android
- Occupation: Science officer

Ash is a fictional character in the film Alien (1979) portrayed by actor Ian Holm who, while known in the UK as a stage actor, was at the time unknown to American audiences. Ash serves as the secondary antagonist of the first film. The character is the science officer of the Nostromo, who breaks quarantine by allowing Kane, a member of the crew, back on board after he has been infected by an alien life form. It is later discovered that Ash is not human as he appears, but a Hyperdyne Systems 120-A/2 android, a sleeper agent who is acting upon secret orders to bring back the alien lifeform and considers the crew and cargo to be expendable.

== Character development ==
=== Alien ===
At the beginning of the film, Ash is depicted as quiet, logical and scrupulously adherent to company regulations. When the Nostromo ostensibly discovers a signal on the planet LV-426, Ash ensures that the crew investigates by pointing out that failure to do so will incur a total forfeiture of their personal shares in Weyland-Yutani, per company regulations. Ash originally claims the message is indecipherable, but after landing on LV-426 Ripley is able to determine that it is likely some form of warning, and not an SOS as previously assumed. Even so, Ash convinces her that heading out after the search party to warn them would be futile. Once the search party returns, Ash breaks quarantine protocol (disobeying Ripley, the ship's second ranking officer) and allows the infected Kane back on board, seemingly out of compassion, and is later seen marveling at the creature attached to him. Ash repeatedly ignores Parker's urging that Kane be placed in frozen suspension.

Ripley becomes suspicious of Ash as a result of these actions. Captain Dallas discloses that Ash replaced the vessel's regular science officer two days before the ship left Thedus. When Ripley, by checking the main computer, discovers the real reason for the Nostromo's diversion, Ash assaults Ripley, attempting to kill her by forcing a rolled-up pornographic magazine down her throat. In the midst of their struggle, two of the surviving crew members, Parker and Lambert, arrive and rescue Ripley. Ash is struck over the head twice with a canister, the first time causing him to malfunction and the second decapitating him. When even that fails to kill him, he is electrocuted with a cattle prod.

His severed head is reactivated to provide the crew with the truth about the creature. Ash complies, revealing that secret company protocols dictate that he must bring the creature back to earth for study by the weapons division, with the crew's lives being "expendable". After informing them of all he knows about the creature, Ash tells the crew that "You have my sympathies", regarding their chances of survival. Ripley then unplugs him and Parker incinerates his head with a flamethrower.

Ripley's experiences with Ash left her with a great hostility towards androids, seen with her reaction to Bishop in the sequel Aliens.

=== Alien: Out of the Shadows ===
Midway through the novel, following Ripley's escape from the Nostromo at the end of Alien, Ash's programming had secretly remained in control of the Narcissus, Ripley's escape pod. After keeping the shuttle drifting for thirty-seven years, he detected the distress call sent out by the Marion and rerouted the shuttle to intercept it, hoping to continue with his mission to acquire a xenomorph specimen for Weyland-Yutani. Soon after arriving at the Marion, Ripley learned of Ash's survival and he eventually revealed himself to the group (the explanation for his voice having changed, which occurs only in the audioplay adaptation of the book, being the Seegson terminal he uploaded himself into). Throughout the incident aboard the Marion, and on planet LV-178 below, Ash continued to plot against the survivors. After learning that a crew member had been impregnated with a chestburster, Ash planned to arrange the deaths of the rest of the crew, hoping that the crew member would then enter hypersleep aboard the Narcissus, allowing him to deliver her — and the embryo she carried — to Earth. However, the crew member committed suicide before Ash could put his scheme into motion.

With his plans to recover a xenomorph in ruins, Ash, apparently driven insane by the years he had spent drifting alone aboard the Narcissus, planned to continue his journey with Ripley, with whom he imagined he had developed an intimate connection. However, before the Narcissus departed the Marion, Ash was finally destroyed when Hoop wiped the AI's program from the shuttle's mainframe using a computer virus. As Ash died, he made one last mission log to Weyland-Yutani, musing to himself that as his messages hadn't been going through to Weyland-Yutani, he has written the equivalent of a diary. With Ash destroyed, Ripley drifted through space for a further twenty years before being rescued (see Aliens).

=== Alien: Romulus ===
Rook, an android science officer onboard the space station (sectioned Romulus and Remus), is depicted as having a resemblance to Ash; while they are not the same person, they share similar knowledge in operating systems.

== Interpretation and analysis ==
=== Otherness ===
Kaveney characterizes Hill's and Giler's "menacing robot" as a counter-revisionist robot, from an era where the image of the robot in science fiction was reverting to its pre-Isaac Asimov characterization of "a competitor to humanity who would sooner or later turn on us or pass for human and mis-lead us". The revelation that Ash is, in the words of crewman Parker at the crux of the fight scene, "a goddamned robot", is a pivotal point of the plot of the film, that forces, for the audience, a retrospective wholesale reinterpretation of all his prior actions. Moreover, as Nicholas Mirzoeff observes, with Ash, Alien recapitulates the idea central to Invasion of the Body Snatchers that "the most frightening monster is the one that looks exactly like other humans" and that "the replica human is almost as threatening as the extraterrestrial itself". Indeed, in a direct echo of Body Snatchers, when Ash is first hit by the canister, causing him to go berserk, he emits a high-pitched squealing noise, just as do the aliens in Body Snatchers. Like the alien organism itself, Ash (and indeed the sentient ship's computer, named "Mother") is presented as, in the words of M. Keith Booker, a "distinctive mode of intelligent existence that seems alien to our own", and is in fact (if one counts the dead pilot of the crashed spaceship) one of a number of sentient non-humans that humanity encounters in the film.

Roz Kaveney believed the revelation that Ash is not human is "in a sense no surprise". It comes as a shock to the characters in the film, however. Byers disagreed and placed the revelation as one of the film's "most shocking scenes", where Ash's difference from the other crew members is "shown to be a difference not simply of degree", as the audience might have theretofore supposed, "but one of kind." (It is Ash who points out, at the start of the film, that their contracts with the Corporation require, under penalty of total forfeiture of shares, the crew to investigate any signs of intelligent life. It is Ash, not yet revealed to be an android, who follows the secret Order #937 stating "crew expendable", apparently, at that point, loyal to the Company even to the extent of sacrificing his own life.) Ash's unmasking shows him to be a traitor, who has been working in the Company's interests all along, because he has been programmed to do so. Worse still, the theretofore benevolent Corporation, that supposedly mandates its crews to rescue spaceships broadcasting distress signals, is revealed as a profiteering entity that cares not at all for human lives, and considers them to be commodities of no more inherent worth than the android machine that they programmed to capture and return a specimen of the alien.

=== Revelation ===
Thompson observes that in hindsight it is clear that Ash is in fact beginning a scientific analysis of the alien, for the Corporation, in these scenes, to which Kane's welfare is largely irrelevant. Ash is acting as the midwife for the organism within Kane. He is anxious when monitoring the activity of the rescue party, in contrast to his lack of apparent emotion at other times, and violates protocol in order to ensure that Kane, with the alien inside him, is brought aboard the Nostromo. When the young alien emerges from Kane's chest, Ash urgently tells the others not to touch it, which in hindsight seems to be out of concern for the survival of the alien rather than the welfare of the human crew members.

=== Loyalty to the Corporation ===
Ash is, in the words of Per Schelde, the "perfect Corporation man". He reflects the Corporation's views, and is its functionary. He is an inhumane science officer who lacks human values, an example of the "mad scientist" or "mad doctor" stereotype of fiction. However, from the character's own viewpoint, according to Mary Pharr, he is neither. He is aware that he is Corporation property and comfortable with his programming, confident and purposeful. He cares neither for the human crew of the Nostromo nor for the humans of the Corporation (who, Pharr notes, would have received a very unpleasant surprise had Ash been successful in transporting the alien back to Earth). His interest is in "collating", the collection of knowledge. When Ripley and the other crewmen power up his head in order to question him about how to kill the alien, he expresses admiration for it. It is, he says, a "perfect organism" whose "structural perfection is matched only by its hostility". He admires the creature's purity as "a survivor, unclouded by conscience, remorse, or delusions of morality." Pharr believes that here Ash is, in fact, describing his ideal self.

=== Sexual metaphors and undertones ===
Other commentary focuses more on the sexual metaphors and undertones of the character. Gerard Loughlin notes that Holm's "subtly prissy" performance of the role conveys a sense of "otherness" for Ash. This was suggested yet further by material that never made it into the released film. Ridley Scott reveals, in the DVD commentary, the existence of a deleted scene where the two female characters discuss Ash, where they discover that neither have had sexual intercourse with him. "I never got the idea that he was particularly interested", states Lambert to Ripley (the scene does appear in the novelization). Loughlin observes that this is suggestive of homosexuality on Ash's part, although his true nature is revealed when he attempts to kill Ripley with the pornographic magazine; an act which is both an echo of the way that the alien "facehugger" infests its victims, and a sexual symbol of phallic penetration and rape by an android that, even if it did have a phallus (which is not specified in the film), would probably have been sexually non-functional.

Thompson relates the assertion, echoed by Gallardo and Smith, that Ash's use of the pornographic magazine against Ripley "relat[es] pornography to violence against women", but disputes it, stating that this analyzes the scene by itself, without taking into account the larger context of the rest of the film. Thompson points out that this is a clumsy and inefficient way to attempt to kill Ripley, as evidenced not the least by the fact that it takes long enough that other characters are able to turn up on the scene and intervene. Thompson states that rather than relating to pornography and the nature of the magazine, Ash's assault is structured as it is by the filmmakers in order to allude to the "facehugger"'s infestation of its victims, as observed by Ash in an earlier scene where Kane is being CT-scanned. Although not in itself explicitly sexual, it does involve the creature's reproductive cycle. Thompson argues that Ash is here simply emulating the creature that he so admires. Ash's instructions from the Corporation, Thompson argues, did not explicitly state that he kill any member of the crew, and it is possible that Ash acquired his notions of the proper way to kill a human being from observing the alien. Thompson qualifies this interpretation by noting that it is not one that is likely to occur upon a first viewing of the film.
