= Prometheus (soundtrack) =

Prometheus: Original Motion Picture Soundtrack

Film score by Marc Streitenfeld
- Released: May 15, 2012 (iTunes); June 4, 2012 (Audio CD) (UK); June 12, 2012 (Audio CD) (US)
- Recorded: Abbey Road Studios
- Genre: Soundtrack
- Length: 57:07
- Labels: Sony Classical; Fox Music

Professional ratings
Review scores
Source	Rating
Filmtracks	3/5 stars

Prometheus: Original Motion Picture Soundtrack is an original motion picture soundtrack album for the 2012 science fiction film, Prometheus. Written by German composer Marc Streitenfeld, the soundtrack also features two supplemental pieces by English composer Harry Gregson-Williams, and it was conducted by Ben Foster.

== Development ==
Marc Streitenfeld is a frequent collaborator with Ridley Scott. The Prometheus project becoming the fifth collaboration between the composer and the director. The score was recorded over one week with a 90-piece orchestra at Abbey Road Studios in London, England, where it was also processed by Scott after the fact. Streitenfeld began coming up with ideas for the score after reading the script prior to the commencement of filming. To create an "unsettling" sound, he provided the orchestra with reversed music sheets to have them play segments of the score backwards, before then digitally reversing it. The track "Friend from the Past" reprises Jerry Goldsmith's original main title from the Alien soundtrack.

== Release ==
The Prometheus soundtrack album was released on iTunes on 15 May 2012 and in audio CD on June 4 in the United Kingdom. It was released in the United States on June 12.

== Track listing ==
All music is by Streitenfeld, with the exception of the two supplemental score tracks by Gregson-Williams as noted.

No.	Title	Artist	Length
1.	"A Planet"	Marc Streitenfeld	02:36
2.	"Going In"	Marc Streitenfeld	02:06
3.	"Engineers"	Marc Streitenfeld	02:32
4.	"Life"	Harry Gregson-Williams	02:33
5.	"Weyland"	Marc Streitenfeld	02:07
6.	"Discovery"	Marc Streitenfeld	02:35
7.	"Not Human"	Marc Streitenfeld	01:51
8.	"Too Close"	Marc Streitenfeld	03:23
9.	"Try Harder"	Marc Streitenfeld	02:04
10.	"David"	Marc Streitenfeld	03:02
11.	"Hammerpede"	Marc Streitenfeld	02:46
12.	"We Were Right"	Harry Gregson-Williams	02:45
13.	"Earth"	Marc Streitenfeld	02:38
14.	"Infected"	Marc Streitenfeld	01:59
15.	"Hyper Sleep"	Marc Streitenfeld	02:03
16.	"Small Beginnings"	Marc Streitenfeld	02:14
17.	"Hello Mommy"	Marc Streitenfeld	02:06
18.	"Friend from the Past"	Marc Streitenfeld	01:16
19.	"Dazed"	Marc Streitenfeld	04:32
20.	"Space Jockey"	Marc Streitenfeld	01:32
21.	"Collision"	Marc Streitenfeld	03:08
22.	"Debris"	Marc Streitenfeld	00:47
23.	"Planting the Seed"	Marc Streitenfeld	01:38
24.	"Invitation"	Marc Streitenfeld	02:18
25.	"Birth"	Marc Streitenfeld	01:26
Total length:			57:07

== Selected credits ==
- Choir – Apollo Voices, Bach Choir, Metro Voices
- Chorus Master [Choirmaster] – Jenny O'Grady
- Booklet editing and design – WLP Ltd
- Music Editor [London] – Kirsty Whalley
- Music Editors – Del Spiva, Joseph Bonn, MPSE
- Orchestra Leader – Everton Nelson
- Solo horn - Richard Watkins
- Album mastered by Dave Collins
- Album mixed by Greg Hayes
- Music by Marc Streitenfeld (tracks: 1 to 3, 5 to 11, 13 to 25)
- Conducted and orchestrated by Ben Foster
- Music programmed by Sunna Wehrmeijer
- Score recorded and mixed by Peter Cobbin
