= Alien: Out of the Shadows =

Book by Tim Lebbon

- Cover of the first edition of the book
- Author: Tim Lebbon
- Original title: Alien: Out of the Shadows
- Cover artist: Dan Luvisi
- Language: English
- Series: Alien
- Genre: Thriller
- Publisher: Titan Books
- Publication date: January 28, 2014
- Publication place: United States
- Media type: Print (paperback, hardcover); Digital (Kindle, audio); Audio play
- Pages: 352
- ISBN: 978-1-781-16268-2
- Followed by: Alien: Sea of Sorrows & Alien: River of Pain

Alien: Out of the Shadows is a 2014 novel written by Tim Lebbon and published by Titan Books. Set between Alien and Aliens, the book chronicles Ellen Ripley's involvement in a Xenomorph outbreak on the planet LV-178 and the mining vessel in orbit above it. The survivors' attempts to escape the creatures are further complicated by Ash, whose A.I. consciousness has survived inside Narcissus, the shuttle that brought Ripley to them.

Besides standard print editions, in 2016 the novel was released in audiobook format, published by Audible Studios. Instead of a traditional audiobook, the novel was presented in the format of an audio drama, read by an ensemble cast and directed by Dirk Maggs. It was released on April 26, 2016, as part of Alien Day.

Out of the Shadows is the first novel in the Alien trilogy, designed to tie into events from the existing film series. It is followed by Alien: Sea of Sorrows and Alien: River of Pain. Originally slated for release in December 2013, the book wouldn't see release until January 28, 2014.

== Synopsis ==
As a child, Chris Hooper dreamed of monsters. But in deep space, he found only darkness and isolation. Then on planet LV178, he and his fellow miners discovered a storm-scoured, sand-blasted hell – and trimonite, the hardest material known to man.

When a shuttle crashes into the mining ship Marion, the miners learn that there was more than timonite deep in the caverns. There was evil, hibernating – and waiting for suitable prey.

Hooper and his associates uncover a nest of Xenomorphs, and hell takes on new meaning. Quickly they discover that their only hope lies with the unlikeliest of saviours…

Ellen Ripley, the last human survivor of the salvage ship Nostromo.

== Plot summary ==
In 2159, DSMO Marion is in orbit above LV-178 while its crews mine for trimonite beneath the planet's surface. Two days after Marion loses contact with the mine complex, the ship's transport shuttles, Samson and Delilah, launch from the planet and head for Marion at full speed; contact with their crews reveal alien creatures that are slaughtering the shuttles' occupants. The Delilah ploughs into the Marion, severely damaging the ship and killing its captain and security officer. Samson docks successfully, but the survivors aboard the Marion, now led by Chief Engineer Chris "Hoop" Hooper, seal it off to contain the four Aliens on board. The impact has knocked Marion out of orbit, meaning the ship will soon burn up when it hits LV-178's atmosphere. Worse still, the long-range antenna has been destroyed, forcing the survivors to transmit a localized distress call.

The Marion's transmission is detected by the Narcissus, the escape shuttle used by Ellen Ripley to flee the destruction of the Nostromo thirty-seven years previously. Unknown to Ripley, the shuttle is under the control of Ash, who, before his destruction on the Nostromo, uploaded his AI consciousness to the shuttle's systems. Learning of the Aliens on the Marion, Ash reroutes the shuttle to rendezvous with the mining vessel, still seeking to fulfill Special Order 937 and recover one of the creatures. Upon arrival, Ripley's quickly realizes that she has been drifting for three and a half decades, that Ash is still with her, and that she has awoken in the midst of another life-threatening scenario involving the Aliens.

With time running out before the Marion enters LV-178's atmosphere, the survivors hatch a desperate plan — to flee in the Narcissus, taking it in turns to use the shuttle's single stasis pod for six months at a time, hoping to reach inhabited space before they die of old age. However, they must replace the shuttle's spent fuel cell, and the only ones available are stored in the mine on LV-178. Worse still, the only ship capable of taking them there is the Samson, still docked and sealed with four Aliens on board. With no alternative, the crew open the Samson and take on the Aliens using mining tools. Engineers Welford and Powell are killed, along with medic Garcia, while one of the Aliens survives and escapes onto the Marion.

Leaving the Alien on board the Marion, the remaining survivors — Hoop, Ripley, Sneddon, Baxter, Kasyanov and Lachance — fly below to LV-178 in the Samson and enter the mine. As they descend into the complex, Ash — having now infected the Marion's computers — sabotages the elevator and sends them plunging to the very lowest level of the mine, where the Aliens were discovered. The elevator is smashed beyond repair, and the survivors are forced to trek through the complex to reach a second elevator at the far side. They soon stumble upon an Alien hive, as well as a massive derelict spacecraft buried underground. With the Aliens pursuing them, they have no choice but to head inside the ship.

The survivors soon discover they have been herded inside because the ship is full of Alien eggs, which were apparently being nurtured by the ship's long-dead creators, a mysterious race of dog-like aliens. The survivors desperately fend off multiple Alien attacks and the repeated assaults begin to take their toll — Baxter breaks an ankle, Sneddon is subdued by a Facehugger, Kasyanov is sprayed with acid and loses the use of one arm, and Ripley is badly wounded. Despite their injuries, the survivors escape the ship and reach the second elevator, although Baxter is bisected when an Alien pulls him partially out of the cage as it is ascending. The survivors finally recover a replacement fuel cell, setting a second to overload and destroy the mine before returning to Marion. Once on board, they witness the explosion on the planet's surface.

As the group heads to the medical bay, they are attacked by the remaining Alien and Lachance is killed. A revived Sneddon chases after the creature, eventually cornering it in a hold where she blows herself up as the Chestburster inside her begins to hatch, killing the adult Alien as well. With time running out before Marion breaks up, Hoop and Kasyanov place Ripley in the ship's med pod to treat her wounds. Tormented by recurring nightmares of her daughter Amanda being attacked by the Aliens, Ripley also begs to have her memories of recent events wiped, and Hoop reluctantly complies. Kasyanov also enters the med pod to heal her own injuries, but Ash takes over and has the machine kill her.

Hoop carries an unconscious Ripley to the Narcissus and puts her into stasis with Jones, who had remained safely locked aboard the shuttle all along. Hoop then wipes Ash from the shuttle's computer with a powerful virus program, finally destroying him, but discovers that the rogue AI, in a final act of defiance, has sabotaged the shuttle's automatic docking release. With no alternative, Hoop bids farewell to Ripley and steps back onto Marion to launch the shuttle. He tearfully watches her leave, knowing that she won't even remember him when she wakes up. Awaiting the Marion's disintegration, Hoop fetches all the supplies he can and boards the Samson. Watching the Marion break up in LV-178's atmosphere, looking down on the obliterated mining complex, Hoop helps himself to a bottle of bourbon and records a distress call, declaring himself as the last survivor of the Marion.

== Development ==
The novel is the first in a new trilogy that ties into the events of the Alien films, although the subsequent books will not be penned by Lebbon, but by two other authors — James A. Moore and Christopher Golden, respectively. The project was said to have been spearheaded by Golden after Titan Books expressed an interest in publishing new Alien novels. According to Lebbon, "the three novels are very much stand-alone, but they do together form a fascinating, wide-ranging look at the Alien universe, and Weyland-Yutani's scheming place in it." The novels were written under the supervision of 20th Century Fox, and have been confirmed as part of the film series' canon. Out of the Shadows was the first Alien novel to be published by Titan Books.

== Reception ==
Reception to the novel was generally positive, although with a fair amount of reservation and criticism directed at the inclusion of Ellen Ripley, which was viewed as unnecessary and — given that her survival into Aliens was guaranteed — detrimental to any suspense the book may otherwise have generated. The manner in which Ripley's memories of the events aboard the Marion were erased was also derided. The lack of development in the supporting characters was likewise singled out as one of the novel's shortfalls, with many agreeing the supporting cast were merely "fodder for the aliens". However, the book's action sequences were strongly praised, as was the introduction of the unidentified aliens and their derelict spacecraft buried under the surface of LV-178. Lebbon was also commended for his grasp of Ripley's character, with several reviewers pointing out that her dialogue in particular sounded very much like it could have come from Ripley as portrayed in the film series by Sigourney Weaver.

== Audiobooks ==
Audible Studios released an audio drama version of Out of the Shadows in April 2016, performed by an ensemble cast, directed by Dirk Maggs and with music by James Hannigan. Cast members include Matthew Lewis, Laurel Lefkow, Corey Johnson, Rutger Hauer, Kathryn Drysdale and Andrea Deck. Later in June, an unabridged audiobook version narrated by Jeff Harding was also released.

=== Voice cast ===
- Laurel Lefkow as Ellen Ripley
- Rutger Hauer as Ash
- Matthew Lewis as Baxter
- Kathryn Drysdale as Sneddon
- Corey Johnson as Hooper
- Abdul Salis as Powell
- Andrea Deck as Kasyanov
- Nathan Osgood as Welford
- Mac McDonald as Lachance
- Regina Brandolino as Garcia
- Tom Alexander as MU / TH / UR 6000 & The Marion Computer
