= Alien (soundtrack) =

Alien: Original Motion Picture Score

Soundtrack album by Jerry Goldsmith
- Released: 1979
- Genres: Avant-garde; classical
- Length: 33:37 Original; 126:18 Complete Edition
- Labels: 20th Century Fox Records Original T-593; Intrada Complete Edition
- Producer: Jerry Goldsmith

Alternative cover
- Cover of the Intrada Complete Edition

Professional ratings
Review scores
Source	Rating
AllMusic	5/5 stars
Filmtracks	3/5 stars
Soundtrack-express	5/5 stars
Soundtrack.net	5/5 stars

Alien: Original Motion Picture Score came out in 1979 and achieved critical acclaim, being released commercially in multiple forms during the following decades. The iconic, avant-garde score to the film Alien was composed and arranged by Jerry Goldsmith and is considered by some to be one of his best, most visceral scores. Rather than focusing on themes, Goldsmith creates a bleak and dissonant soundscape that fits the film's dark and intense atmosphere, with only a few "romantic" cues.

== Background ==
The music was performed by the National Philharmonic Orchestra and conducted by Lionel Newman. However, the music was not originally used or heard as intended. The score was substantially cut for the film's released versions, and some recordings from other sources were added, notably portions of Goldsmith's original score for the 1962 film Freud (which were that film's Main Title, as well as the tracks Charcot's Show and Desperate Case), and the first movement (adagio) from Howard Hanson's 1930 "Symphony No. 2, Romantic" for the film's end credits.

The complete intended score was first released as an isolated track on a 1999 20th Anniversary DVD edition on 20th Century Fox Home Entertainment (it has subsequently appeared on budget DVD and Blu-ray releases of the film). On November 15, 2007, Intrada Records released this same intended score with additional alternate score tracks and the original LP program in a 2-CD set. This release is the first to publish Jerry Goldsmith's complete score remixed and remastered from the original 1" master tapes.

== Track listing ==
=== Original track listing ===
No.	Title	Length
1.	"Main Title"	3:30
2.	"The Face Hugger"	2:32
3.	"Breakaway"	7:34
4.	"Acid Test"	4:35
5.	"The Landing"	4:29
6.	"The Droid"	4:40
7.	"The Recovery"	2:44
8.	"The Alien Planet"	2:28
9.	"The Shaft"	3:57
10.	"End Title"	3:02

=== Complete edition track listing ===
Disc 1

1. "Main Title" (4:12)
2. "Hyper Sleep" (2:46)
3. "The Landing" (4:31)
4. "The Terrain" (2:21)
5. "The Craft" (1:00)
6. "The Passage" (1:49)
7. "The Skeleton" (2:30)
8. "A New Face" (2:35)
9. "Hanging On" (3:39)
10. "The Lab" (1:05)
11. "Drop Out" (0:57)
12. "Nothing To Say" (1:52)
13. "Cat Nip" (1:01)
14. "Here Kitty" (2:08)
15. "The Shaft" (4:31)
16. "It's A Droid" (3:28)
17. "Parker's Death" (1:51)
18. "The Eggs" (2:24)
19. "Sleepy Alien" (1:04)
20. "To Sleep" (1:56)
21. "The Cupboard" (3:05)
22. "Out The Door" (3:13)
23. "End Title" (3:09)
24. "Main Title" (Rescored Alternate) (4:11)
25. "Hyper Sleep" (Rescored Alternate) (2:45)
26. "The Terrain" (Rescored Alternate) (0:58)
27. "The Skeleton" (Rescored Alternate) (2:31)
28. "Hanging On" (Rescored Alternate) (3:08)
29. "The Cupboard" (Rescored Alternate) (3:12)
30. "Out The Door" (Rescored Alternate) (3:02)

Disc 2

1. "Main Title" (3:37)
2. "The Face Hugger" (2:36)
3. "Breakaway" (3:03)
4. "Acid Test" (4:40)
5. "The Landing" (4:31)
6. "The Droid" (4:44)
7. "The Recovery" (2:50)
8. "The Alien Planet" (2:30)
9. "The Shaft" (4:01)
10. "End Title" (3:09)
11. "Main Title" (film version) (bonus) (3:44)
12. "The Skeleton" (alternate take) (bonus) (2:34)
13. "The Passage" (demonstration excerpt) (bonus) (1:54)
14. "Hanging On" (demonstration excerpt) (bonus) (1:08)
15. "Parker's Death" (demonstration excerpt) (bonus) (1:07)
16. "It's A Droid" (unused inserts) (bonus) (1:27)
17. "Eine Kleine Nachtmusik" (source) (bonus) (1:49)

== Personnel ==
credits for the original edition by 20th Century Fox Records

- Conductor – Lionel Newman
- Engineer [Mixing Engineer] – Eric Arthur Tomlinson
- Orchestra – The National Philharmonic Orchestra
- Orchestrated By – Arthur Morton
- Producer, Arranger, Composed By – Jerry Goldsmith
- Remix, Edited by – Len Engel
