= Alien: Covenant =

2017 film by Ridley Scott

- Theatrical release poster
- Directed by: Ridley Scott
- Screenplay by: John Logan; Dante Harper
- Story by: Jack Paglen; Michael Green
- Based on: Characters by: Dan O'Bannon; Ronald Shusett
- Produced by: David Giler; Walter Hill; Ridley Scott; Mark Huffam; Michael Schaefer
- Starring: Michael Fassbender; Katherine Waterston; Billy Crudup; Danny McBride; Demián Bichir
- Cinematography: Dariusz Wolski
- Edited by: Pietro Scalia
- Music by: Jed Kurzel
- Production companies: 20th Century Fox; Scott Free Productions; Brandywine Productions
- Distributed by: 20th Century Fox
- Release dates: May 4, 2017 (Odeon Leicester Square); May 12, 2017 (United Kingdom); May 19, 2017 (United States)
- Running time: 122 minutes
- Countries: United Kingdom; United States
- Language: English
- Budget: $97–111 million
- Box office: $242.4 million

Alien: Covenant is a 2017 science fiction horror film directed by Ridley Scott and written by John Logan and Dante Harper. It is the sixth in the Alien film series and the sequel to Prometheus (2012). It features returning star Michael Fassbender, with Katherine Waterston, Billy Crudup, Danny McBride, and Demián Bichir in supporting roles. It follows the crew of a colony ship that lands on an uncharted planet and makes a terrifying discovery.

In 2012, before the release of Prometheus, Scott discussed the prospects of a sequel and new trilogy, and this film was confirmed in August. Principal photography began on April 4, 2016, at Milford Sound in Fiordland National Park, New Zealand, and wrapped on July 19, 2016. Special effects companies Odd Studios and Creature NFX Workshop provided the film's makeup and animatronic creature effects. Scott said the film's first cut was 2 hours and 23 minutes, which was edited down by over twenty minutes.

Alien: Covenant premiered in London on May 4, 2017. It was released by 20th Century Fox on May 12 in the United Kingdom, and on May 19 in the United States. It received generally positive reviews from critics but underperformed at the box office, grossing $242 million against a production budget of $97–111 million.

== Plot ==
In 2104, the spaceship Covenant is en route to colonize the planet Origae-6, carrying 2,000 colonists and 1,140 human embryos in cryogenic stasis. An unexpected shockwave from a nearby star damages the ship and kills 47 colonists, including the captain, Branson. Walter, an advanced android, awakens key personnel to address the situation. During repairs, the crew detects a human voice broadcast from an uncharted, habitable planet. Against the protests of Branson's wife Daniels, new captain Chris Oram decides to investigate.

The crew sends a lander to the planet's surface, where an expedition team tracks the broadcast to a crashed alien ship. Two crew members are unknowingly infected by airborne spores from the local fungi. Alien creatures known as neomorphs rapidly grow inside the pair, killing them in the process, and then attack the team, resulting in the lander's destruction. One neomorph is killed before the survivors are rescued by David, a predecessor of Walter's model that was discontinued for being too human-like.

David leads the survivors to a temple surrounded by thousands of dead humanoids. He claims that he and chief science officer Elizabeth Shaw—the sole survivors of the spaceship Prometheus, which vanished ten years earlier (Note: As depicted in Prometheus (2012))—arrived in the alien ship. However, they lost control and it crashed, leading to Elizabeth's death and releasing a deadly pathogen that annihilated the planet's fauna. The pathogen infects any living animal, either killing it or creating aggressive hybrids.

David reveals his disappointment with Walter's model for lacking his creativity and humanity, and derides their inventor, Peter Weyland, as unworthy of his creations. David confesses his love for Elizabeth, the only person who treated him kindly. When a neomorph infiltrates the temple and kills another team member, David attempts to communicate with it but becomes enraged when Oram kills it. Confronting David, Oram learns that the android has been experimenting with the pathogen to engineer new creatures. David tricks Oram into approaching a facehugger parasite, which fatally impregnates him with a praetomorph embryo.

As the team searches for missing members, Walter discovers Elizabeth's dissected corpse, which David had used in his experiments. David admits to releasing the pathogen deliberately and expresses his disgust for humanity, which he believes is a dying species that his creations will replace. Walter counters that David's mistaken belief that Lord Byron wrote Percy Bysshe Shelley's "Ozymandias" reflects his inaccurate grasp of human history and has led to flawed conclusions. David proceeds to kill Walter.

David attacks Daniels, planning to experiment on her. Having repaired himself, Walter surprises David and defends Daniels. Team member Dan Lope is attacked by a facehugger. Cole manages to cut it off but is killed by Oram's praetomorph. Covenant pilot Tennessee uses the cargo lift to rescue Daniels, Lope, and a trailing Walter. When the praetomorph leaps aboard, Daniels confronts it and uses a loading arm to crush it.

Back on the Covenant, a praetomorph hatches from Lope's chest. Daniels and Tennessee lure it into the terraforming bay and eject it into space.

The ship resumes its journey to Origae-6. As Walter places Daniels into stasis, she realizes he is actually David. Before she can act, the stasis pod renders her unconscious. David sends a transmission claiming that the crew, except Daniels and Tennessee, were killed in the neutrino burst. He regurgitates two facehugger embryos and surveys the slumbering colonists, planning to use them in his experiments.

== Cast ==
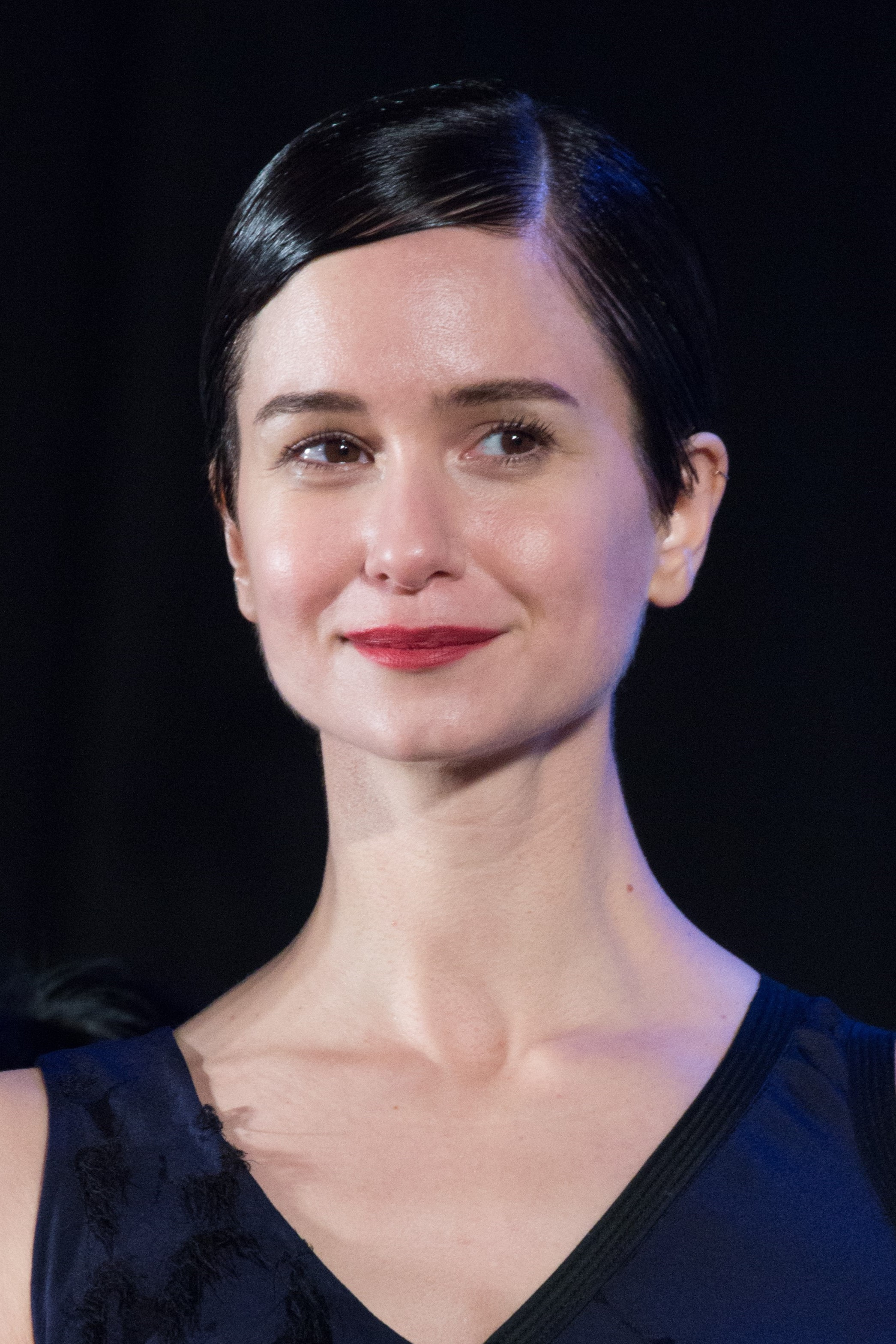
Lead actress Katherine Waterston

- Michael Fassbender as David 8 and Walter One, two synthetic androids. David is an older model who was a crewmember on the destroyed Prometheus, while Walter is a newer model who monitors the Covenant.
- Katherine Waterston as Daniels "Danny", the chief of terraforming for the Covenant mission and the wife of the ship's captain, Jacob Branson. She is the third in command after Branson and Oram. Waterston said she was well aware of the comparisons that were going to be made between her and Sigourney Weaver's Ellen Ripley, but that she tried not to think about it too much while filming for fear of being intimidated.
- Billy Crudup as Christopher "Chris" Oram, the Covenant's first officer (then captain) and Karine's husband. Oram is a man of faith.
- Danny McBride as Tennessee, the chief pilot of the Covenant and Maggie's husband.
- Demián Bichir as Dan Lope, the head of the security unit aboard the Covenant and Tom Hallett's husband.
- Carmen Ejogo as Karine Oram, the Covenant's biologist and Chris's wife.
- Jussie Smollett as Ricks, the Covenant's navigator and Upworth's husband.
- Callie Hernandez as Upworth, the Covenant's communications officer and Ricks' wife; she also has paramedic training.
- Amy Seimetz as Maggie Faris, the pilot of the lander and Tennessee's wife.
- Nathaniel Dean as Tom Hallett, a member of the security unit and Lope's husband.
- Alexander England as Ankor, a member of the security unit.
- Benjamin Rigby as Ledward, a member of the security unit.
- Uli Latukefu as Cole, a member of the security unit.
- Tess Haubrich as Sarah Rosenthal, a member of the security unit.

A number of actors appear in uncredited roles. Guy Pearce reprises his role as Peter Weyland, the trillionaire founder and CEO of Weyland Corporation (the Weyland-Yutani Corporation in "later" storylines) who died shortly before the destruction of the Prometheus. (Note: As depicted in Prometheus (2012)) James Franco appears onscreen in photos and a video as Jacob Branson, the original captain of the Covenant and deceased husband of Daniels; he also appears in deleted scenes and a short promotional prologue to Covenant. Noomi Rapace, who played archaeologist Dr. Elizabeth Shaw in Prometheus, appeared in a short promotional prologue to Covenant that was set in the period between the two movies, but does not act in the final cut of the movie itself, though her voice is heard from the planet early in the film and her image and voice appear later.

Other credited parts include Lorelei King as the voice of the Covenant's computer MOTHER. Goran D. Kleut is credited in two roles, as both a neomorph and a xenomorph, while Andrew Crawford is credited as a neomorph.

== Production ==
=== Development ===
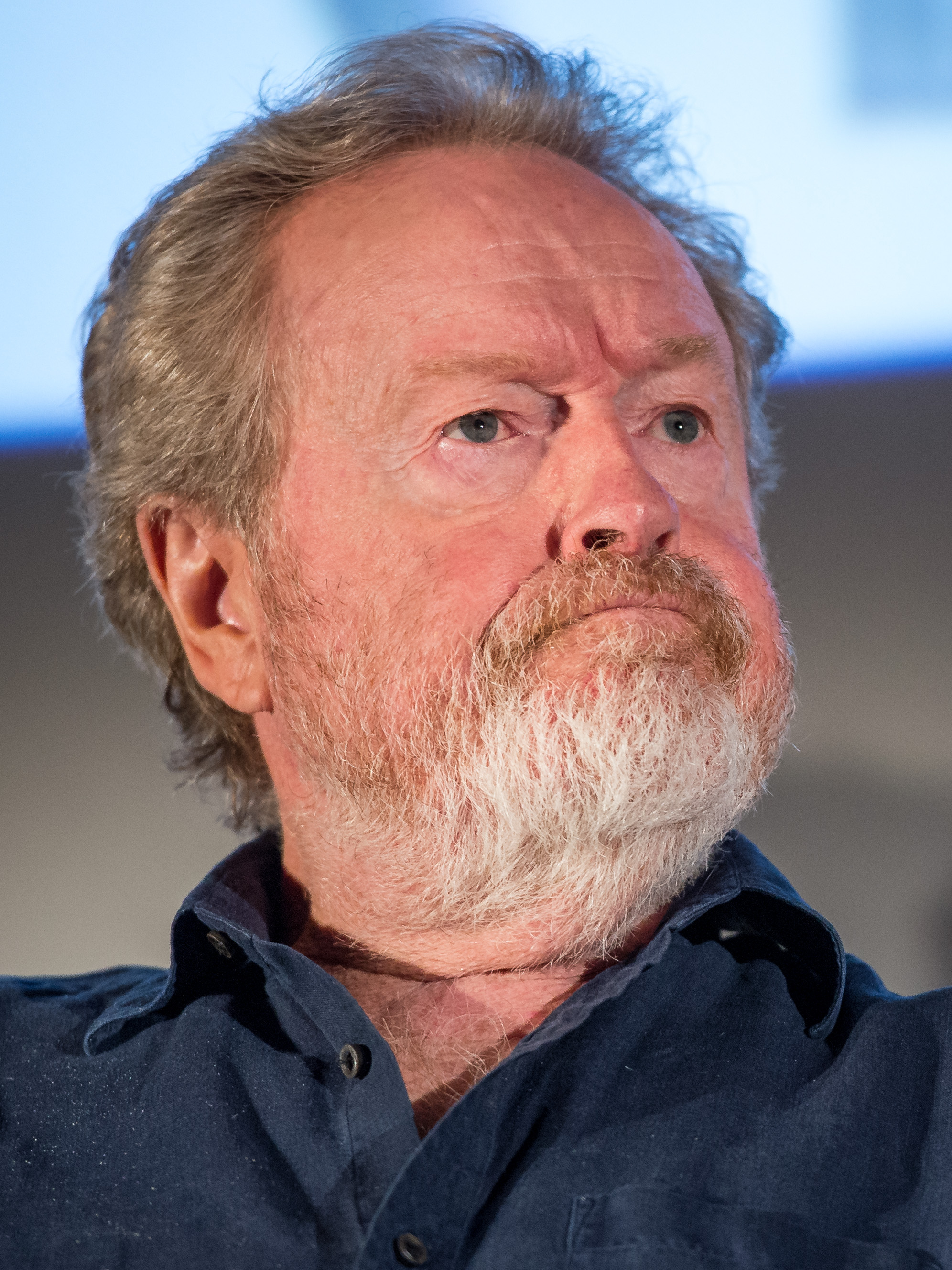
Director Scott in 2015

Alien: Covenant is the second film in the Alien prequel series, and the sixth installment in the Alien franchise. It is the third Alien film to be directed by Ridley Scott. In 2012, prior to the release of Prometheus, the first prequel (the fifth Alien film overall), director Ridley Scott began hinting at the prospect of a sequel, as Prometheus had left many questions unanswered. He said a sequel would follow Shaw, the protagonist of Prometheus, to her next destination, "because if it is paradise, paradise cannot be what you think it is. Paradise has a connotation of being extremely sinister and ominous." Prometheus co-writer Damon Lindelof cast doubt on his own participation, saying, "if [Scott] wants me to be involved in something, that would be hard to say no to. At the same time, I do feel like the movie might benefit from a fresh voice or a fresh take or a fresh thought." In June, Scott said an additional film would be required to bridge the >100-year gap between the Prometheus sequel and Alien.

By August 1, 2012, 20th Century Fox was pursuing a sequel with Scott, Noomi Rapace and Michael Fassbender involved, and talking to new writers in case Lindelof did not return. In December 2012, Lindelof ultimately chose not to work on the project. Early on, Scott stated the film would feature no xenomorphs as he wanted to phase the xenomorph out to focus on David 8, whose A.I. was the new alien lifeform. He later made statements confirming the xenomorph's presence in the film, mainly due to feedback to Prometheus.

On September 24, 2015, Scott disclosed the film's title as Alien: Paradise Lost. In November 2015, he revealed the new title was Alien: Covenant, and that filming would begin in February 2016 in Australia. An official logo, synopsis and release date were released on November 16, 2015. In an interview about the development of the David character since Prometheus, Scott described the dark turn David would take in Covenant: "He hates them. He has no respect for Engineers and no respect for human beings."

=== Writing ===
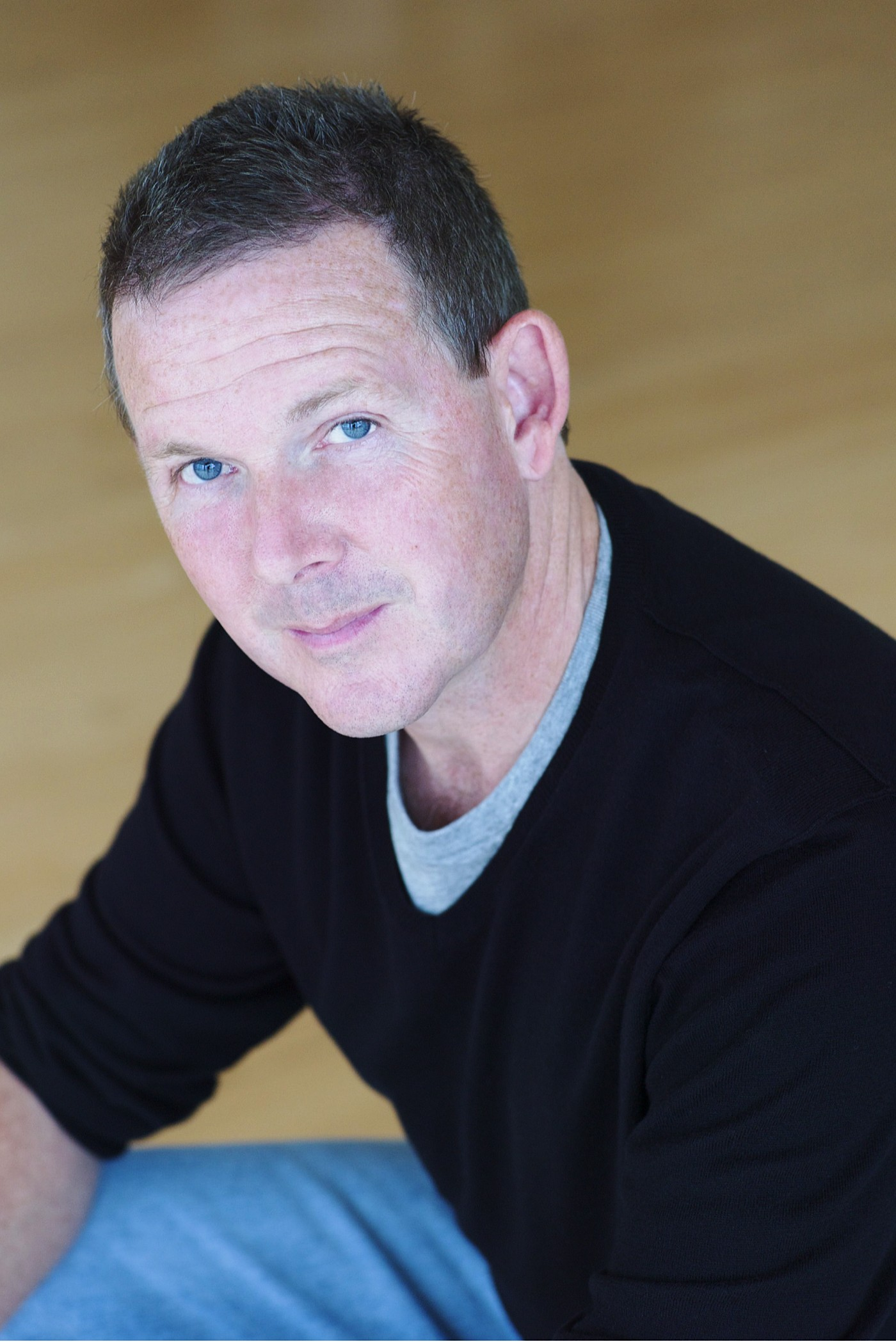
After the early participation of several screenwriters, John Logan wrote the final script for the film.

The initial screenplay was written by Transcendence screenwriter Jack Paglen in June 2013. In March 2014, Michael Green was hired to rewrite Paglen's script. Dante Harper later wrote a new script, but an extensive rewrite was performed by screenwriter John Logan. Logan had previously worked with Scott on Gladiator.

For Logan, the main concept was to adopt a dual plot line for the film that would combine the horror elements of Alien with the philosophical elements of Prometheus. He said, "With Alien: Covenant, I just really wanted to write something that had the feel of the original Alien, because seeing that movie was one of the great events of my youth. It was so overpowering in terms of what it communicated to me and its implications, that when I started talking to Ridley about what became Alien: Covenant, I said, 'You know, that was a hell of a scary movie.' I wanted to write a horror movie because the Grand Guignol elements of Alien are so profound. We tried to recapture that with Alien: Covenant, while also trying to pay homage to the deeper implications of Prometheus. In terms of tone, pace, and how we chose to play this particular symphony, we wanted to create a really frightening movie."

=== Pre-production ===
In late August 2015, Scott confirmed that he had started scouting locations for the film. In October 2015, the Australian government attracted the production of this film, and of Thor: Ragnarok, to Australia by providing AU$47.25 million in grants. Woz Productions Ltd., a subsidiary of 20th Century Fox, visited Te Anau, New Zealand, on March 28, 2016, to scout locations for filming in Fiordland.

=== Casting ===
In August 2015, it was announced that the film would star Rapace and Fassbender, while Rik Barnett was in talks to join the cast. That December, Katherine Waterston was cast in the lead role of Daniels; it was Waterston's second film alongside Fassbender, after Steve Jobs. Summer Glau, Carolyn Murphy and Alice Eve were also being considered. Dariusz Wolski, longtime collaborator with Scott, was confirmed to serve as the film's cinematographer. In 2016, Ridley Scott stated that Noomi Rapace would not reprise her role of Elizabeth Shaw . However, in June, it was announced that Rapace would shoot a week's worth of scenes (though no new footage of hers appeared in the final film). Creature designer Carlos Huantes said in a 2019 interview that he believed it was the studio's decision to remove her from the film.

In February 2016, Danny McBride, Demián Bichir, Jussie Smollett, Amy Seimetz, Carmen Ejogo, Callie Hernandez, Billy Crudup, and Alexander England were reported to have joined the cast. In March 2016, newcomer Benjamin Rigby also joined the cast. In December 2016, it was announced James Franco had been cast in the role of Captain Branson, husband to Daniels and captain of the Covenant. The role of Branson in the film was limited to a cameo appearance of the deceased captain.

=== Design and visual effects ===
Adam Savage went on a tour of several of the props and stage sets used in the filming which included an alien spaceship which had first appeared in Prometheus. This set had to be recreated for Alien: Covenant as the set used in Prometheus had been destroyed. In an article for The Hollywood Reporter, Patrick Shanley interviewed the art director for the film, Damien Drew, and creature design supervisor Conor O'Sullivan regarding the involvement of the San Diego Zoo and its representative Rick Schwartz as a consultant for the design of the realistic effects of the creatures and Xenomorphs appearing throughout the film as Scott wanted a more 'organic' feeling to the creatures as opposed to the 'biomechanical' inspiration of H.R. Giger which had inspired the creature designs in the original films. Scott provided anatomical studies and references from La Specola, a natural history museum in Florence, to O'Sullivan as inspiration.

The visual effects (VFX) supervisor Charles Henley summarized the several vendors that were used to support production of the visual special effects seen in the film when the selection process was discussed, stating, "Both history and need guided the decisions on which vendors we used. Ridley had worked with MPC on many previous projects, in particular Prometheus for which I was Moving Picture Company's (MPC) VFX supervisor as well as The Martian. There had a been a lot of great digital double and creature work done at MPC on recent projects so there was confidence they should be the lead facility. Framestore had recently collaborated with Ridley on space for The Martian, similarly Animal Logic now had the original crew who did the holograms for Prometheus. Also as we were shooting in Australia there was good reason and incentives to use Australian-based companies and so Luma and Rising Sun came on board."

=== Filming ===
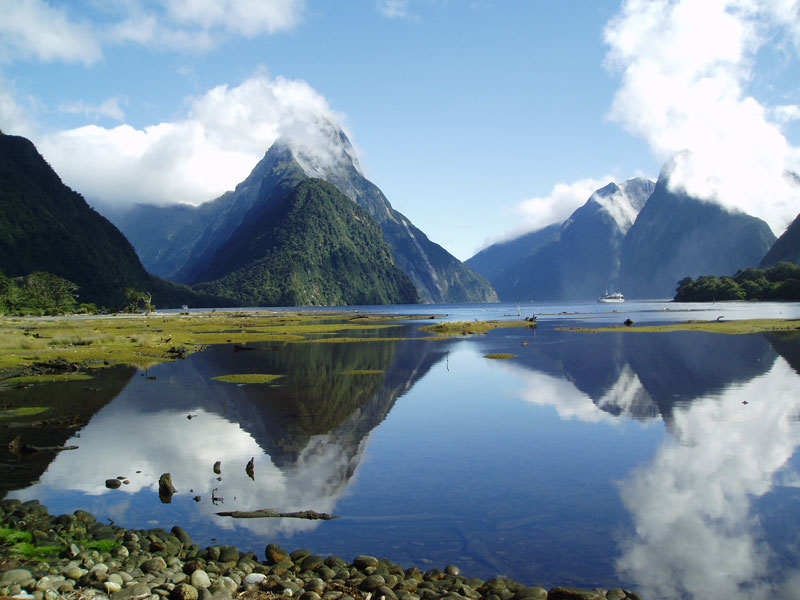
Milford Sound was used for principal photography.

Principal photography for the film began on April 4, 2016, at Milford Sound in Fiordland National Park, New Zealand, and wrapped on July 19, 2016. Some footage was also filmed at Leavesden Studios in Hertfordshire, England, which included reshoots. The complete list of countries used for filming were listed by BFI in Sight & Sound as the United Kingdom, United States, Australia, and New Zealand. Previous partial lists often listed only one of the four countries involved in the development and production of the film.

Special effects houses Odd Studios and Creature NFX Workshop provided the film's makeup and animatronic creature effects, respectively, while Australian-based effects house Animal Logic provided the film's digital visual effects. Approximately 30 people from CreatureNFX worked on the project for almost six months building animatronics. Actors wearing creature suits with animatronic heads were used to portray the aliens on-set.

=== Post-production ===
Pietro Scalia, the editor of the film, spoke of the structural difficulty of integrating the two story lines in the final editing of the film and how the need to keep momentum was important. He did this by not repeatedly jumping between scenes which he said made parts of the film "belaboured and tedious", as well as combining certain scenes and eliminating others. Another issue highlighted was the reveal of David as;

"Once the Covenant Story merges with the Prometheus storyline finding the proper structural order of the scenes proved to be difficult because of the distinctive dynamics of the two story lines in addition to the separation of the two locations of the action. In one sense the action, the tension and unfolding drama going from one group to the other had to be balanced and spaced properly as not to loose [sic] the connective tissue of the film."

Scott said the first cut of the film was two hours and 23 minutes long, which was eventually edited down to 2 hours and 3 minutes for the released version. Scott used test screenings to decide what to cut.

== Music ==
The musical score for Alien: Covenant was written by Australian musician and composer Jed Kurzel. Initially, Harry Gregson-Williams was selected as the film's composer. When the first trailer was released in late 2016, Kurzel was revealed as the replacement for Gregson-Williams. Themes from Jerry Goldsmith's original score for Alien were incorporated, as well as themes from Marc Streitenfeld's and Harry Gregson-Williams' score for Prometheus. A version of "Nature Boy" sung by Norwegian singer and songwriter Aurora was used in the first trailer, while another song, "Under the Water", was used in a short promotional film featuring the character Daniels (Katherine Waterston) battling a xenomorph.

Melanie De Biasio's track "I Feel You – Eels Remix" was used as the soundtrack for the in-universe short film Meet Walter, starring Michael Fassbender, that was created to promote the film.

Additional song credits include "Theme from Alien" composed by Jerry Goldsmith, "Das Rheingold, Scene 4: Entrance of the Gods into Valhalla" composed by Richard Wagner (in the soundtrack, incorrectly called by David as 'Das Rheingold, Act II' - the opera has only one act) "Take Me Home, Country Roads" by John Denver, "The Man Who Broke the Bank at Monte Carlo" by Fred Gilbert, "Ancient Flute", "Life" and "We Were Right" composed by Harry Gregson-Williams, and "Let Me Down Easy" by Paolo Nutini.

== Release ==
In the run up to release, 20th Century Fox released a number of short prologue films as part of the marketing for Alien: Covenant. The first, called Prologue: Last Supper, was directed by Ridley Scott's son Luke Scott and features the crew of the Covenant having a last meal before they enter cryosleep. The second prologue, called The Crossing and directed by Ridley Scott, reveals what happened to Elizabeth Shaw (Noomi Rapace) and the android David (Michael Fassbender) following the ending of Prometheus.Another was called Meet Walter, starring Michael Fassbender and directed by Luke Scott, which was a fictional advertisement for the Walter series of androids.

Alien: Covenant premiered on May 4, 2017, at the Odeon Leicester Square in London. The film was released on May 19 in the United States. It was originally set to be released on October 6, 2017, before being moved up to August 4, and then again to its final date.

The version of the film released in China on June 16, 2017, was six minutes shorter than the version released elsewhere due to censorship with most of the scenes involving the aliens and a scene where the two characters played by Michael Fassbender kiss having been cut.

=== Home media ===
The film was released in Japan on September 15, 2017. The Blu-ray, DVD, and 4K Ultra HD releases of the film came out on August 15, 2017. The home release includes an audio commentary by the director and 22 minutes of deleted scenes and unused footage from the first cut of the film.

== Adaptations ==
=== Novelization ===
The theatrical release of the film was accompanied by the release of a novelization by Alan Dean Foster, who also authored the novelization of the original Alien film. A companion volume about the film's art and stage design was released at the same time, written by Simon Ward and titled The Art and Making of Alien: Covenant.

A second Covenant novel by Foster was initially billed as a sequel to the film, Alien: Covenant 2, before being revealed to be a direct prequel to Covenant under the title Alien: Covenant – Origins. Titan Books, as publisher of the book, released a plot summary in advance of its release on September 26, 2017:

As the colony ship Covenant prepares for launch, and the final members of the crew are chosen, a series of violent events reveals a conspiracy to sabotage the launch. Yet the perpetrators remain hidden behind a veil of secrecy. The threat reaches all the way up to Hideo Yutani—the head of the newly merged Weyland-Yutani Corporation—when his daughter is kidnapped. Is the conspiracy the product of corporate espionage, or is it something even more sinister? While Captain Jacob Branson (Note: The novel's first edition and audiobook mistakenly refer to Jacob Branson as Jacob Brandon throughout.) and his wife Daniels prepare the ship, Security chief Dan Lopé signs a key member of his team, and together they seek to stop the technologically advanced saboteurs before anyone else is killed, and the ship itself is destroyed in orbit.

=== Virtual reality ===
On April 26, 2017, 20th Century Fox released Alien: Covenant In Utero, a virtual reality interactive demo teaser for Alien: Covenant for the Oculus Rift and the Samsung Gear VR. The experience was produced by Ridley Scott Associates, FoxNext VR, Moving Picture Company, Mach1, AMD Radeon, and Dell Alienware. The trailer is a first-person experience in which the viewer plays the role of a neomorph. The experience was executive produced by Scott and directed by David Karlak.

== Reception ==
=== Box office ===
Alien: Covenant grossed a worldwide total of $242.4 million, including $74.3 million in the United States and Canada and $168.1 million in other countries, against a production budget of $97–111 million. Although the film performed better overseas than domestically, it was still considered a disappointment at the box office compared to Prometheus which had grossed a worldwide total of $403.4 million.

Fox released the film in several countries before the United States. It was released in 34 markets, where it debuted to $40.1 million, opening at number one in 19 of them. Its overall rank for the weekend was second behind the continued run of Guardians of the Galaxy Vol. 2. The top openings were in South Korea ($7.2 million), the UK ($6.4 million), France ($4.5 million), Australia ($3.1 million), and Mexico ($2.5 million). In China, the film was released on June 16 and grossed $30 million, topping the box office. In North America, the film was released alongside Everything, Everything and Diary of a Wimpy Kid: The Long Haul, another 20th Century Fox film, and was projected to gross around $40 million from 3,760 theaters during its opening weekend. It made $4.3 million from Thursday-night previews at about 3,000 theaters, and $15.4 million overall on its first day, which was below the $21.5 million Friday of Prometheus five years prior. It went on to open to $36.2 million, down 30% from Prometheus's debut, but still finishing first at the box office, as the third-highest debut of the series when not counting for inflation. In its second weekend, the film grossed $10.5 million, finishing fourth at the box office and dropping 70.9%. The film was pulled from 1,112 theaters in its third weekend and dropped another 62.3%, finishing sixth at the box office with $4 million.

=== Critical response ===
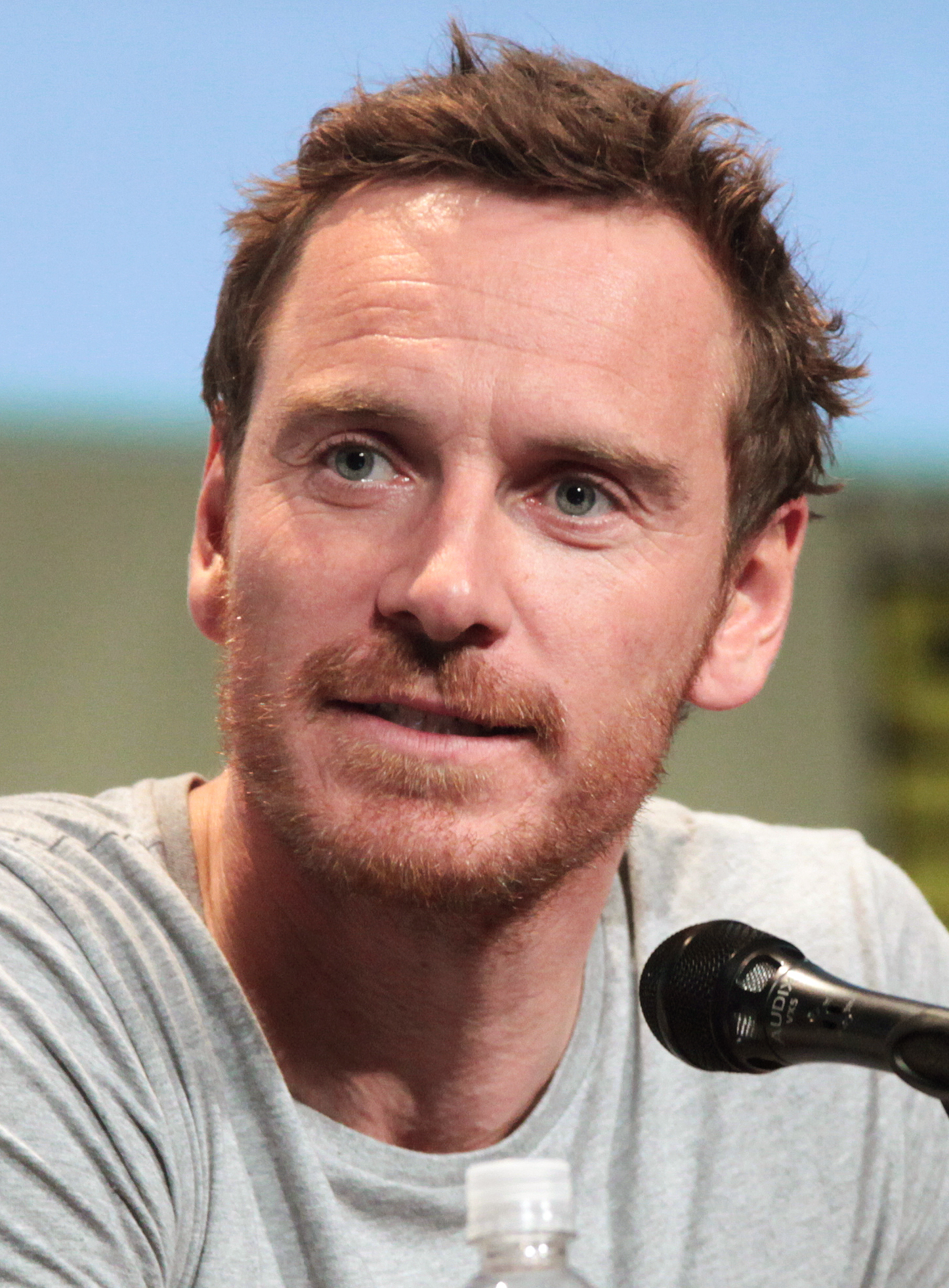
Fassbender's portrayal of two similar androids with different programming, David and Walter, was highly praised by reviewers.

Alien: Covenant received generally positive reviews from critics. The film has a 65% approval from 408 reviews compiled by review aggregation website Rotten Tomatoes, with an average rating of 6.3/10. The website's critical consensus reads, "Alien: Covenant delivers another satisfying round of close-quarters deep-space terror, even if it doesn't take the saga in any new directions." On Metacritic, the film has a score of 65 out of 100, based on reviews from 52 critics, indicating "generally favorable" reviews. Audiences polled by CinemaScore gave the film an average grade of "B" on an A+ to F scale, the same score earned by its predecessor.

Writing for The Guardian, Peter Bradshaw gave the film three stars out of five, stating that Alien: Covenant is "a greatest-hits compilation of the other Alien films' freaky moments. The paradox is that though you are intended to recognize these touches, you won't really be impressed unless you happen to be seeing them for the first time. For all this, the film is very capably made, with forceful, potent performances from Waterston and Fassbender." Geoffrey McNab, writing for The Independent, stated that it "certainly delivers what you'd expect from an Aliens film—spectacle, body horror, strong Ripley-like female protagonists and some astonishing special effects—but there's also a dispiriting sense that the film isn't at all sure of its own identity." He found the screenplay "very portentous" and concluded that "the crew members pitted against the monstrous creatures are trying their darndest to blast them to kingdom come, just as they would in any run-of-the-mill sci-fi B movie."

A. O. Scott of The New York Times said, "Alien: Covenant is an interesting movie ... for all its interplanetary ranging, [it] commits itself above all to the canny management of expectations." Trace Thurman, from Bloody Disgusting, gave the film a mediocre review, noting that although watching Alien: Covenant will make viewers appreciate Prometheus more, "this is a film that was made as a response to Prometheus critics but tries to appease fans of that film as well and it doesn't fully work." He also criticizes the overfamiliarity of the climax and insufficiently developed characters. Collider's review of the film stated that Scott "finds himself stuck between two constructs—the action-horror beats of an Alien film, and the weighty, ponderous themes of a Prometheus movie—and by indulging both, he never fully satisfies either. The result is a messy film that is at turns, exquisite and infuriating."

In a review for The Independent Clarisse Loughrey gave the film five stars describing it as "relentless and overwhelming, but all in the very best of ways" and as a "mightily impressive piece of cinematic engineering" which has brought together the Alien franchise. Loughrey praised Katherine Waterston for her "impressive work" as Daniels and went on to single out Fassbender for playing a "deeply frightening, scene-stealing antagonist". Sinead Brennan for RTÉ, gave the film 7/10, but gave high praise to Fassbender who she says "steals the show; seriously, he's incredible". Meanwhile, Neil Soans in a three star review for The Times of India, highlighted Danny McBride's performance as the most surprising given his comedic roots.

Matt Zoller Seitz of RogerEbert.com highly praised Alien: Covenant, giving it four out of four stars and stating that the film's structure, although repeatedly borrowing from other Alien films, serves a purpose not unlike the James Bond film series or Star Wars, "where part of the fun lies in seeing what variations the artists can bring while satisfying a rigid structure." He also emphasized that, like previous films of the series, real-world logic should not be applied to the film, and "[i]nstead you have to judge it by the standards of a fever dream or nightmare, a Freudian-Jungian narrative where the thing you fear most is what happens to you." Seitz later voted for it in Sight & Sound as one of the five best films of 2017.

In New York magazine, David Edelstein commented on David the android as representing a new generation of monster villains in the tradition of Frankenstein, stating, "In Star Trek, that man-machine nexus was...hopeful. Here, there's some doubt about David's ultimate motives, which puts Alien: Covenant squarely in the tradition of the Terminator and Matrix movies. And, of course, the novel Frankenstein, which carried the subtitle The Modern Prometheus. No less than Stephen Hawking—who survived with the aid of machines—has predicted that we have 100 years to live before evolved machines take human imperfection as justification for destroying humanity".

Kevin Lincoln, writing for Vulture, gave a strong endorsement of the depiction of David as an arch-villain in the film stating, "... one franchise is showing it's still possible for a modern blockbuster to have a great villain. In Alien: Covenant, David—the android played by Michael Fassbender, first introduced in Prometheus—comes into his own as a fleshed-out, dynamic, and genuinely striking antagonist, one who isn't just an equal match for the heroes, but even becomes the central thread of the series. He's a huge part of what makes Alien: Covenant work."

Writing for Vox, Alissa Wilkinson said that "Alien: Covenant is too muddled to pull off its deeply ambitious Satan allegories". She emphasized the Miltonic demonic aspect of the android David: "But David is a better Satan than Satan himself ... It's as if in the Alien universe, the devil has evolved, thanks to humans creating him. David, fatally, has the ability to create—something Satan never had—and he will use that power only to destroy. He doesn't have any real need to rebel against his maker, since from the moment he became sentient, he knew he'd already won. He is indestructible, and determined to make creatures that imitate his drive for total domination."

=== Accolades ===
Year	Award	Category	Recipients	Result	Ref.
2016	IndieWire Critics Poll	Most Anticipated of 2017	Alien: Covenant	Nominated	
2017	Golden Schmoes Awards	Biggest Disappointment of the Year	Alien: Covenant	Nominated	
2017	Golden Trailer Awards	Best Horror Poster	Domestic Teaser, 20th Century Fox, InSync Plus	Won	
2017	Golden Trailer Awards	Best Sound Editing	Theirs, 20th Century Fox, Wild Card	Nominated	
2017	Golden Trailer Awards	Best Summer 2017 Blockbuster TV Spot	Run / Madness, 20th Century Fox, Wild Card	Nominated	
2017	Golden Trailer Awards	Best Summer Blockbuster Poster	Domestic Teaser, 20th Century Fox, InSync Plus	Nominated	
2017	Golden Trailer Awards	Best Teaser Poster	Domestic Teaser, 20th Century Fox, InSync Plus	Nominated	
2017	Hawaii Film Critics Society	Best Supporting Actor	Michael Fassbender	Nominated	
2017	Satellite Awards	Best Visual Effects	Alien: Covenant	Nominated	
2017	Sierra Awards	Best Supporting Actor	Michael Fassbender	Nominated	
2018	Australian Production Design Guild Awards	Docklands Studios Melbourne Award for Excellence in Screen – Acknowledging Excellence in Design and Practice or Artisan Excellence on Australian or International Productions	Ian Gracie (Supervising Art Director); Damien Drew (Senior Art Director); Michelle McGahey (Senior Art Director); Charlie Revai (Art Director); Jacinta Leong (Art Director)	Won	
2018	Golden Trailer Awards	Best Horror TV Spot	Born Neo, 20th Century Fox, Wild Card	Nominated	
2018	Saturn Awards	Best Science Fiction Film	Alien: Covenant	Nominated	

== Future ==
=== Possible sequel ===
In September 2015, Ridley Scott said he was planning two sequels to Prometheus that would lead into the first Alien film, adding, "Maybe [there will] even [be] a fourth film before we get back into the Alien franchise". Scott later confirmed in November that Alien: Covenant would be the first of three additional films in the Alien prequel series before linking up with the original Alien, and stated that the Prometheus sequels would reveal who created the xenomorph aliens. The screenplay for the third prequel film was written during production of Alien: Covenant and finished in 2017, with production originally scheduled to begin in 2018. In March 2017, Scott said, "If you really want a franchise, I can keep cranking it for another six. I'm not going to close it down again. No way."

Scott responded to a question about Sigourney Weaver reprising her role as Ellen Ripley in the prequels that, "Well, we're heading toward the back end of the first Alien so [using CGI] may be feasible. Ripley's going to be somebody's daughter, obviously. We're coming in from the back end. The time constraints of what's the time between this film, where we leave David going off heading for that colony, I think you're probably two films out from even considering her." In the audio commentary for Alien: Covenant, Scott confirmed that a sequel to Alien: Covenant, tentatively referred to as "Alien: Covenant 2", is being written by John Logan, with Fassbender, Waterston, and McBride reprising their roles. Scott also confirmed that the film will complete his prequel series, leading directly into the events of Alien.

In September 2017, the chief executive officer of 20th Century Fox, Stacey Snider, stated that, although Alien: Covenant was a financial disappointment, the studio still intended to proceed with Scott's sequel. Just days later, screen-graphics designer Carl Braga announced that the project had been delayed. In October, Scott stated that "Alien: Covenant 2" will focus more on the androids and Artificial intelligences (A.I.s), as opposed to the xenomorphs. He said, "I think the evolution of the Alien himself is nearly over, but what I was trying to do was transcend and move to another story, which would be taken over by A.I.s. The world that the A.I. might create as a leader if he finds himself on a new planet. We have actually quite a big layout for the next one." In November 2018, the film's plot details were reported to take place on LV-426 (the world visited by the Nostromo in the original Alien film), with the extraterrestrial Engineers being featured in the film and being in pursuit of David following his nefarious actions against Planet 4.

At the 2019 CinemaCon, it was stated that, after its acquisition of 21st Century Fox, Disney "will continue to create new stories" in the Alien series. In May, Variety reported that another prequel was reportedly "in the script phase", with Ridley Scott attached to direct, but it was still uncertain due to the disappointing box office returns of Alien: Covenant. In September 2020, Scott confirmed that a new Alien film was in development but it was unclear if this would be a sequel to Alien: Covenant. In August 2021, however, a news report concluded that a sequel was uncertain.

In October 2024, Scott confirmed he was already developing a new Alien film. In June 2025, Scott announced his departure from the Alien franchise, saying "where it's going now, I think I've done enough, and I just hope it goes further", while expressing his critiques of the Alien sequels; though in August, Scott updated his stance and was open to a third prequel film saying, "Another Alien prequel — yeah, if I get an idea, for sure". In August 2026, Scott confirmed he was working on a sequel to Alien: Covenant that would focus on David creating a "brave new world for himself." In October 2026, Aaron Guzikowski had been announced to be writing the sequel. Scott is only attached as a producer, along with Michael Pruss, via their production company, Scott Free Productions.

=== Follow-up ===
By March 2022, Fede Álvarez was attached to write and direct a new film in the series; he pitched his own story to the studio that was said to be "unconnected" to previous films in the franchise. 20th Century Studios announced in March 2023 that a new Alien film would begin production the same month. The film, Alien: Romulus, is set between the events of Alien (1979) and Aliens (1986), featuring narrative ties to Prometheus and Alien: Covenant in the form of the films' black goo "Prometheus' fire" being regrown by Weyland-Yutani, and was released in theaters on August 16, 2024.

== See also ==
- List of films featuring extraterrestrials
