= Plague (2014 film) =

- Film poster
- Directed by: Kostas Ouzas; Nick Kozakis
- Written by: Kostas Ouzas
- Produced by: Alexandros Ouzas
- Starring: Tegan Crowley; Scott Marcus; Steven Kennedy; Don Bridges; Nicholas Stribakos; Sarah Ranken; Liza Dennis; Benjamin Rigby
- Cinematography: Tim Metherall
- Edited by: Nick Kozakis
- Production company: Burning Ships
- Distributed by: Exile Entertainment
- Release date: 22 November 2014
- Running time: 86 minutes
- Country: Australia
- Language: English
- Budget: A$140,000

Plague is a 2014 Australian horror film directed by Kostas Ouzas and Nick Kozakis, written by Ouzas, and starring Tegan Crowley, Scott Marcus, and Steven Kennedy. After a zombie apocalypse, Evie (Crowley) and her husband John (Marcus) struggle to survive on their own. They receive help in the form of a resourceful stranger, Charlie (Kennedy), who shows up one day and offers to assist them. It had a private screening at the Astor Theatre in Melbourne on 29 October 2014 and premiered at the Fantastic Planet Sci-Fi, Horror, and Fantasy Film Festival on 22 November.

== Plot ==
Society breaks down after a virus causes the infected to turn into cannibalistic killers. When Evie's husband John becomes separated from the rest of the group during an attack, the survivors fall back to their emergency shelter. Gary and Evie want to wait for John, as they all agreed they would do in such a circumstance, but Bob becomes increasingly impatient. Citing the realities of the situation, Bob says they must assume John is dead and leave for a more permanent shelter. Although Bob backs down, he later takes the group's car, rifle, and supplies by force. When Gary objects, Bob shoots him in the head, killing him. Sammy, the group's mechanic, and Marge, Bob's wife, leave with him. They leave Evie behind.

John finally arrives. He is angered to find that Evie has 'allowed' the others to leave with all their supplies. Evie's protestations are cut short when Sammy returns on foot, delirious and obviously infected. John shoots her as she begins to transform. John and Evie attempt to survive on their own but are besieged by zombies. As John is about to commit suicide, a stranger named Charlie saves them. John greets Charlie with suspicion and explains they have nothing he can steal. When Charlie explains he wants nothing more than their companionship and offers to share his supplies, Evie welcomes him. As the three come to trust each other, John explains that he is a former college professor and Evie is a schoolteacher. Charlie introduces himself as a family man who has lost his family.

With Charlie's resourcefulness and skill, the survivors slowly increase their quality of life, though Evie remains bitter about John's previous suicide attempt. When she accuses him of being self-obsessed, Charlie tells her that he can provide for her better than John. Evie becomes uncomfortable, but Charlie pushes for a relationship. John suffers a serious asthma attack, and Evie begs Charlie to find medicine. Charlie insinuates that he knows where to find it, but he will only retrieve it if Evie submits to sex. Desperate, she does. As John and Charlie later talk, Evie searches through Charlie's belongings and finds evidence that he lied about having a family. John initially dismisses her concerns and says that they need Charlie to survive.

They run him off when Charlie reveals that he keeps a former lover, who has since become infected, chained in his car to observe. Charlie immediately returns and angrily confronts them; he accuses them of being ungrateful and says that survival is the only rule in this new society. Since they can not survive without his help, he asserts that he should have whatever he wants. John surrenders his pistol to Charlie and watches helplessly as Charlie drags Evie into their shelter to rape her again. John is anguished by Evie's cries for help but does nothing to assist her. When a lost soldier suddenly shows up, John disarms him and learns about an extraction point. John kills the soldier and shoots Charlie. As he dies, Charlie shoots Evie in the arm. John bandages her, but she struggles to stay conscious.

Charlie's car breaks down near the extraction point. Drawn by John's yelling to alert the military forces he assumes must be near, zombies begin to converge on their location. John pushes for them to continue on foot, but Evie is unable. After urging her to stand several times, John eventually gives up and hands her a pistol. When she realizes that he intends to leave her to die, Evie shoots John in the leg and uses him as a distraction while she escapes from the approaching zombies. Evie proceeds on her own to the extraction point as John is devoured by the zombies.

== Cast ==
- Tegan Crowley as Evie
- Scott Marcus as John
- Steven Kennedy as Charlie
- Don Bridges as Gary
- Nicholas Stribakos as Bob
- Sarah Ranken as Sammy
- Liza Dennis as Marge
- Benjamin Rigby as Corporal Davies

== Production ==
The directors met each other at film school, where they became friends. The actors were recruited locally, and they did not use auditions. Instead, actors were approached and asked what they could bring to the character. Principal photography took place over two weeks in January 2014 in Mansfield, Victoria. The directors split the chores in order to complete the film as quickly as possible. Ouzas worked with the actors, and Kozakis set up shots and worked with the crew. The directors decided to use fast zombies instead of Romero-style slow zombies to reflect current fears. Ouzas said that they symbolize "irrational, unpredictable enemies". Ouzas describes the film as "more a drama than horror film" that focuses on characters rather the zombies. Ouzas believes that horror films became more popular during times of social uncertainty, and he wanted to explore what would happen when the social contract broke down. A female protagonist was chosen to demonstrate how this would affect women. Evie represents the belief that there is an innate good in humanity, while Charlie represents a more self-serving amorality.

== Release ==
Plague had a private screening at the Astor Theatre in Melbourne on 29 October 2014 and had its world premiere on 22 November 2014 at the Fantastic Planet Horror, Sci-Fi, and Fantasy Film Festival in Sydney. The filmmakers chose to focus on digital distribution because theatrical distribution seemed more oriented toward big-budget releases. Plague was the most popular horror film on iTunes after its debut. Screen Media Films bought US distribution rights after the film played at the Marché du Film at Cannes, and they released it on demand in May 2015 and on DVD in June 2015.

== Reception ==
John Noonan of Filmink wrote, "As a debut feature, it's a competently put together piece of work that offers up healthy slabs of scares, but it's often in danger of mistaking heightened emotions for character development." Matt Cameron-Rogers of Beat magazine compared it to classic Ozploitation and wrote, "Ouzas and Kozakis’ film stands as a testament to the skill and ingenuity of the Australian independent film scene."
