= Walter One =

Fictional character featured in the Alien franchise

Walter^{1}
- Alien character
- First appearance: Meet Walter (2017)
- Last appearance: Alien: Covenant (2017)
- Created by: Jon Spaihts; Damon Lindelof; Ridley Scott
- Portrayed by: Michael Fassbender

In-universe information
- Species: Android
- Gender: Male
- Occupation: Caregiver; Ship's mechanic
- Affiliation: Covenant crew

Walter One (Walter^{1}), commonly known simply as Walter, is a fictional character featured in the Alien franchise, portrayed by Michael Fassbender. He is the counterpart to the android David 8, also played by Fassbender. He appeared in Alien: Covenant (2017), its novelization, and multiple accompanying promotional short films.

== Background ==
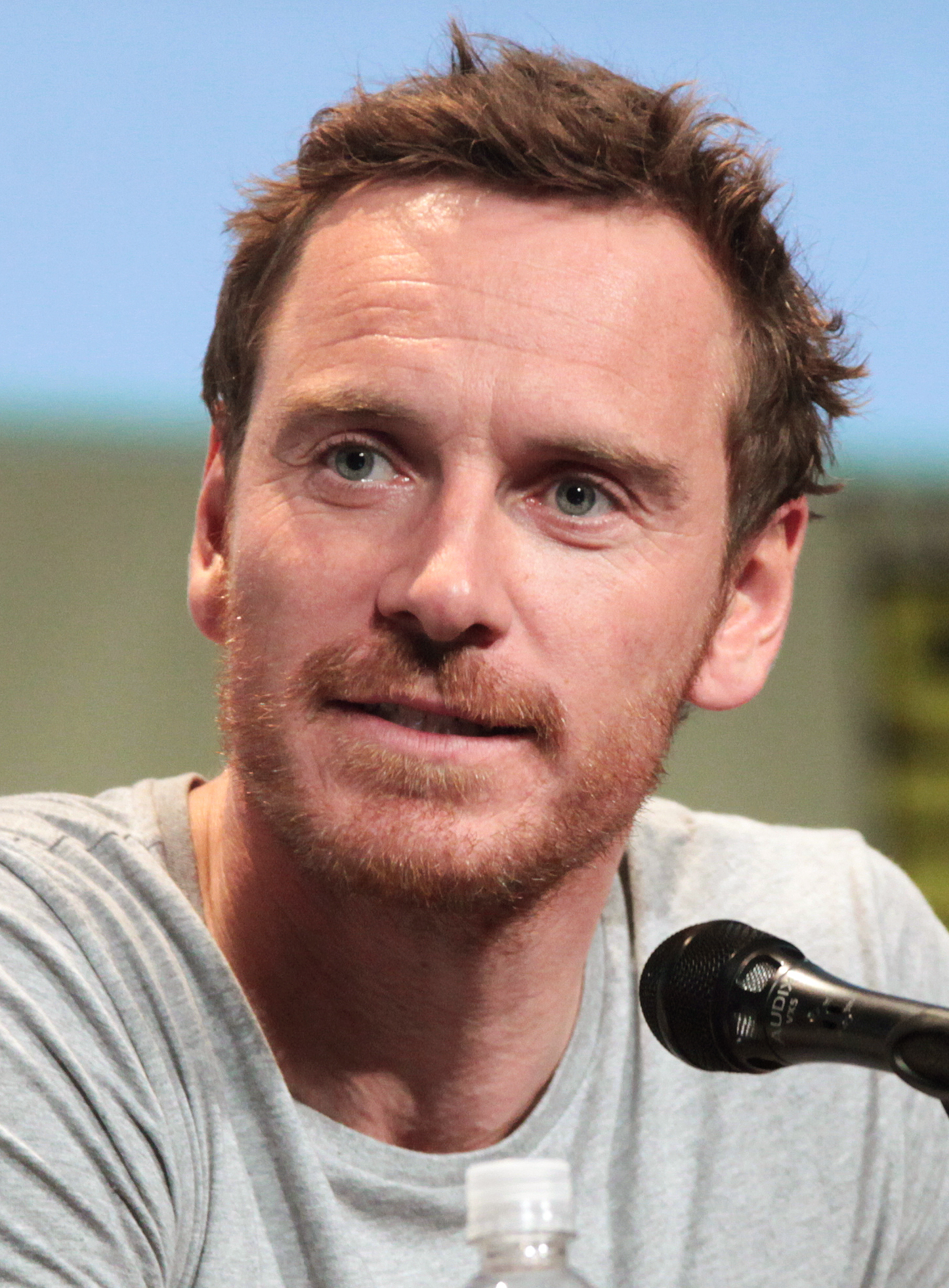
Walter was portrayed by Michael Fassbender, who also played the antagonistic android David.

Unlike each preceding android in the Alien franchise, who had been named in ascending alphabetical order (Ash, Bishop, Call, David), director Ridley Scott named the new character Walter after Alien producer Walter Hill, as predecessor David shares a name with Hill's Brandywine Productions partner David Giler. The character was given an American accent to differentiate him from the British-accented David.

The character was featured in a feature, stylized as an advertisement for the fictional Weyland-Yutani corporation, released in March 2017. Included in the promotional was a link to "MeetWalter.com", which provided in-universe information about the character.

== Fictional character biography ==
Walter One is engineered as a reformed synthetic, after the David 8 model was deemed "too human". According to a trailer and movie promotional website, he has "AMD's Ryzen and Radeon Instinct technology", which allows him to become personalized for each customer. Walter is assigned to monitor and maintain the Covenant, a colonial vessel carrying couples in suspended animation to Origae-6. When a neutrino-burst damages the ship, Walter reanimates his 14 human crewmates. The crew receives a distress call from a seemingly habitable, and much closer, planet and decides to land. On the planet, several of the crewmates are attacked by neomorphs and are saved by David 8, who brings them to an Engineer temple.

In the temple, Walter discovers Elizabeth Shaw's dissected corpse, used by David as material for his evolving creature designs. When Walter confronts David, he is attacked and his spine is removed. However, unlike the earlier model David, Walter's advanced systems allow him to heal. He catches up with David as he is attacking Daniels. She is able to escape as the two synthetics fight. Ultimately, David wins and assumes Walter's identity. It is unclear if Walter is permanently damaged or will be able to recover.

== Reception ==
Fassbender's performance as Walter, and David, was widely praised. Cinema Blend's Gregory Wakeman said "Michael Fassbender who once again steals the show in his dual roles as Walter and David. What we see is far from conventional, yet still always verges on eye-catching. The interactions between the two androids, whose disparate personalities are pitch-perfectly portrayed by the Irishman, are genuinely bizarre, in both a good and bad way."

Aaron Couch of The Hollywood Reporter pointed to the interactions between David and Walter as possibly homoerotic. Others described their relationship as "exclusively gay". Matt Zoller Seitz, writing for RogerEbert.com, noted that "the David-Walter relationship differentiates 'Covenant' from all other 'Alien' films."

== Appearances ==
- Alien: Covenant – Meet Walter (2017)
- Alien: Covenant (2017)
- Alien: Covenant (novel) (2017)
