= Benjamin Rigby =

Australian actor, writer and producer

- Occupation: Actor Producer Writer
- Years active: 2011–present

Benjamin Rigby is an Australian actor, writer and producer.

== Early years and training ==
Rigby attended Scots PGC College in Warwick, Queensland, where he excelled in drama, receiving the Drama Prize in his final year in 2005. He had previously attended Trinity Lutheran College in Ashmore on the Gold Coast. Rigby went on to study a Bachelor of Theatre Arts majoring in acting at University of Southern Queensland, graduating in 2009.

== Career ==
Since graduating, Rigby has appeared in a wide range of theatre, film, and television. He made his television debut in Neighbours as David Sheridan in 2011. In 2013 Rigby appeared in Miss Fisher's Murder Mysteries as Harry "The Hangman" Harper for the ABC. He appeared as a waiter in Garth Davis's Oscar nominated debut feature Lion.

In 2016, he wrote, produced and starred in Bridge which made its world premiere at the Palm Springs International Shortfest. He produced, wrote and starred in the short film We're Not Here, which was executive produced by John Logan and won best screenplay at the Sydney Mardi Gras Film Festival as well as playing festivals Melbourne International Film Festival and Outfest among others.

In 2017, Rigby played Ledward in the short film Alien: Covenant - Prologue: Last Supper and co-starred in the sequel to Prometheus, Alien: Covenant.

In 2018, Rigby starred in Melbourne Theatre Company's production of Abigail's Party. He appears as Bruce McLaren in the Oscar winning Ford v. Ferrari.

In 2025, he played Hansie Dekker in Season 2 of NCIS: Sydney.

== Filmography ==
Year	Title	Role	Notes
2011	Neighbours	David Sheridan	
2012	Green Eyed	Dennis	Short
2013	Miss Fisher's Murder Mysteries	Harry "The Hangman" Harper	
2014	Plague	Corporal Davies	
2014	Rigor Mortis	Mark	Short
2015	The Secret River (TV series)	Flogging Soldier	
2016	Bridge	Dan/Writer/Producer	Short
2016	Lion	Waiter	
2016	Flinder	Nick	Short
2017	Alien Prologue Last Supper	Ledward	Short
2017	That's Not Me	Evan	
2017	Alien: Covenant	Ledward	
2019	Ford v. Ferrari	Bruce McLaren	
2019	We're Not Here	Ryan/Story/Producer	
2020	Ratched	Case Hitchen	
2020	Two Eyes	Dilhon	
2021	It'll Be Over Soon	Ben/Writer/Director	Short
2021	Godzilla vs. Kong	Sonar Operator	
2025	NCIS: Sydney	Hansie Dekker	

== Theatre ==
Theatre
Year	Title	Role	Notes
2018	Abigail's Party	Tony	Melbourne Theatre Company
