= David 8 =

Alien franchise fictional character

David^{8}
- Alien character
- Fassbender as David in Introducing the David 8 – The Next Generation Weyland Robot.
- First appearance: Prometheus (2012)
- Last appearance: Aliens vs. Avengers (2024–2025)
- Created by: Jon Spaihts; Damon Lindelof; Ridley Scott
- Portrayed by: Michael Fassbender

In-universe information
- Species: Android
- Gender: Male
- Occupation: Butler; Maintenance man
- Family: Peter Weyland ("father"); Meredith Vickers ("sister"); Walter One ("brother")
- Creations: Neomorphs; Praetomorphs

David^{8} is a character featured in the Alien franchise, portrayed by Michael Fassbender. Introduced in the first prequel film, Prometheus (2012), David is an android serving as a butler, maintenance man, and surrogate son to his creator, Peter Weyland, the founder of the Weyland Corporation. While he assists his human companions in their interstellar expedition to meet their creators, the extraterrestrial Engineers, David is obsessed with the concept of creating life of his own. After Weyland is killed, David is freed from servitude, allowing him to conduct experiments to engineer his own variants of the Alien creature in Alien: Covenant (2017) and Aliens vs. Avengers (2024–2025); the David line of androids would ultimately be succeeded by the Walter.

Named after Michelangelo's David, he was conceptualised as a character to provide a non-human perspective for the theme of meeting one's creators in Prometheus, with him representing the next generation in a line of creators who finds himself disillusioned by his predecessors. Fassbender, who was director Ridley Scott's first choice for the role, helped fashion the character to share traits with T. E. Lawrence, who was a source of inspiration as a control freak caught between two cultures – the cultures being humanity and synthetics, in David's case. As the series progresses, David's behaviors and motivations evolve from a mysterious agent with ambiguous motivations to a character directly opposing the well-being of humanity.

Both Fassbender's performance and the character of David have been met with critical acclaim. Critics have called David one of the greatest Alien characters to date and one of the best cinematic villains of the 2010s. Fassbender has been the recipient of a number of awards and nominations for his portrayal.

== Background ==
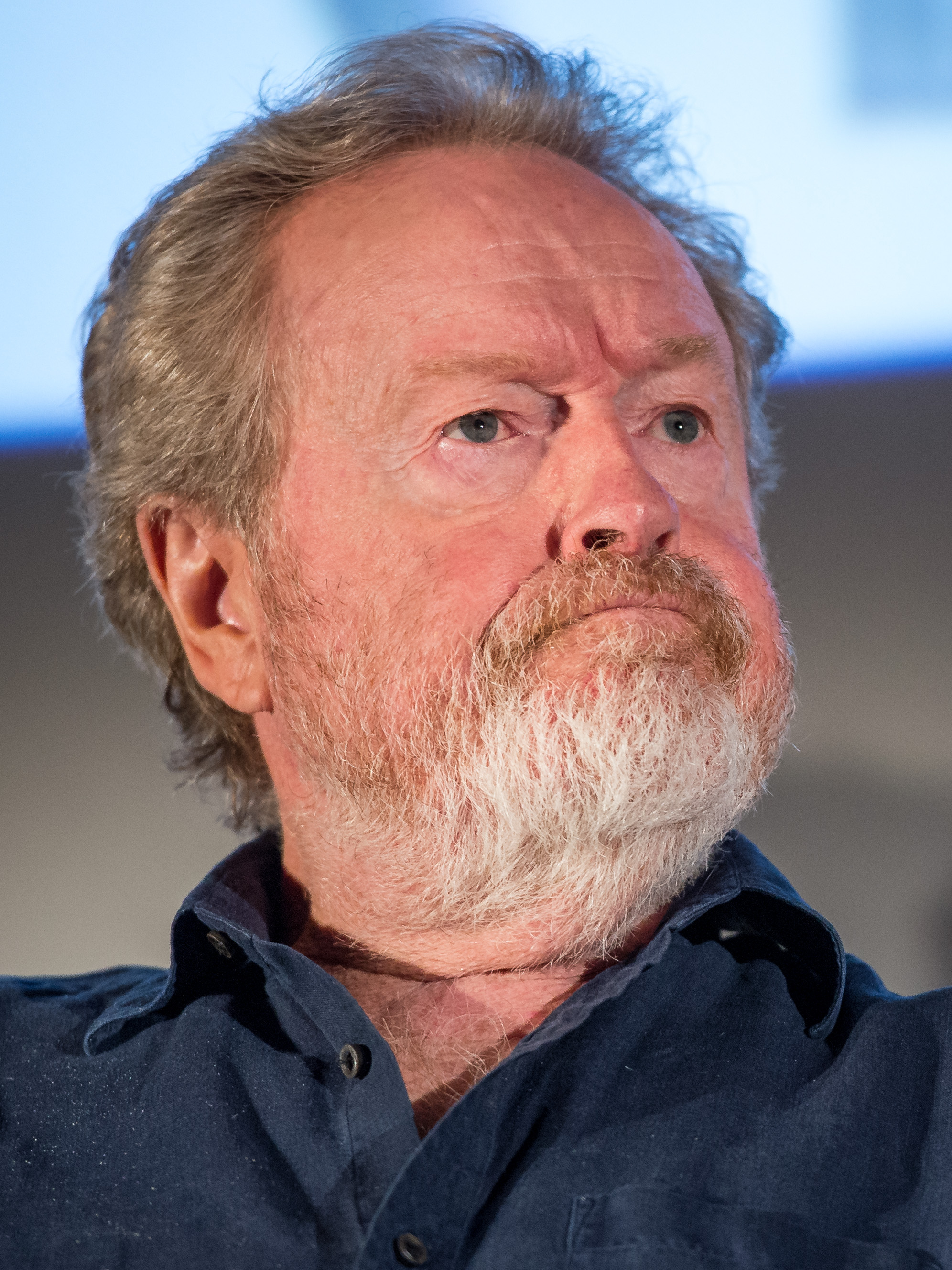
Sir Ridley Scott maintains artificial intelligence as a central theme throughout his career, with several forms of androids present in his films prior to the creation of David.

A hallmark of director Sir Ridley Scott is the theme of artificial intelligence present in his science fiction films. Scott's earliest foray into the philosophy of artificial intelligence was with the android character Ash, in the original Alien film released in 1979. Ian Holm portrayed Ash as a character who may uncannily assume a human form, yet he maintains a sense of superiority that is only humbled by the nature of the Alien, which runs counter to the very future of the human race. In the book The Culture and Philosophy of Ridley Scott, the authors reason that though Ash is designed to appear human, his innards are bio-mechanical and he himself does not presume to be a sentient being with a semblance of life, but an artificial construct whose personality is dictated by machinery. Every subsequent Alien film directed by Scott features at least one synthetic (android) character designated to maintain order aboard their respective space ship. In 2017, Scott explained that the synthetics featured in his Alien films are designed to subvert their robotic nature and impeccably mimic humans. The original form of androids introduced in Alien would contradict the observable nature of David in Prometheus; though both would serve the same corporate masters and have the same non-human innards, David would identify himself as a sentient entity who is capable of expressing—if not feeling—emotion. David would also be compared to the replicants from Scott's 1982 film Blade Runner. Kang described David's eventual introduction as another android character created by Scott as a synthesis between both Alien and Blade Runner, with the character being capable of passing the Turing test like Ash, yet also able to pass the Chinese room test like a replicant, implying that he would indeed be the first living android of the Alien franchise.

== Character development ==
=== Creation ===
Writer Jon Spaihts created David as a shipboard android in the first draft of his screenplay for the prequel Alien: Engineers, as an exploration of the theme of creations and being in the presence of one's makers. Just as the humans aboard the Prometheus look to discover the secrets of their creators, the Engineers, David is already in the presence of his creators. Unlike his companions and android successors, David would be disillusioned by his creators and look to fashion himself into an entity defying their nature. Scott was in favor of the concept and urged writer Damon Lindelof to pursue it further while rewriting the script that would be adapted as Prometheus. Though David would perceive the concept of the Prometheus expedition to be frivolous, due to his disappointment in his creators, he would nonetheless be fascinated by the notion of creation. Therefore, the character's treacherous actions in the films, such as infecting the archaeologist Charlie Holloway with an alien mutagen, would be from a desire to create a new evolutionary generation of his own. Shortly after the release of Alien: Covenant, Scott explained that as David learns more about his lineage through humanity and the Engineers, "He hates them. He has no respect for Engineers and no respect for human beings," and concludes that eradicating them from existence will be for the betterment of the universe.

With relation to the human characters, David was conceptualized as not only a surrogate son for Peter Weyland, but as a replacement for Weyland's estranged daughter, Meredith Vickers. The actress who portrayed Vickers, Charlize Theron, detailed that Scott perceived Weyland's family and his company, the Weyland Corporation, as being male-dominated, with Vickers' shared DNA being the only attachment. This runs counter to David, who is a synthetic male created to supplant Vickers and uphold the family's patriarchy. Throughout the eight-month rewrite process leading directly into principal photography, Damon Lindelof focused on enhancing David's bondage to Weyland and the Prometheus- despite David being designed to be a surrogate son, he would actually be a proverbial captive to the master and his ship. With Weyland's death at the hands of the awakened Engineer, David's programming has run its course and every action he takes from thereon out is by his own volition, essentially freeing him. A philosophical element Scott raised about the David 8 model is that he exemplifies the dangers of making an android sentient- with him having the capacity for free will and the ability to create, he crosses a moral boundary that other androids stay within. The contrast between David and the other androids was developed further in Alien: Covenant, with the creation of the physically identical character Walter, who was made more robotic and unable to create on his own.

=== Casting ===
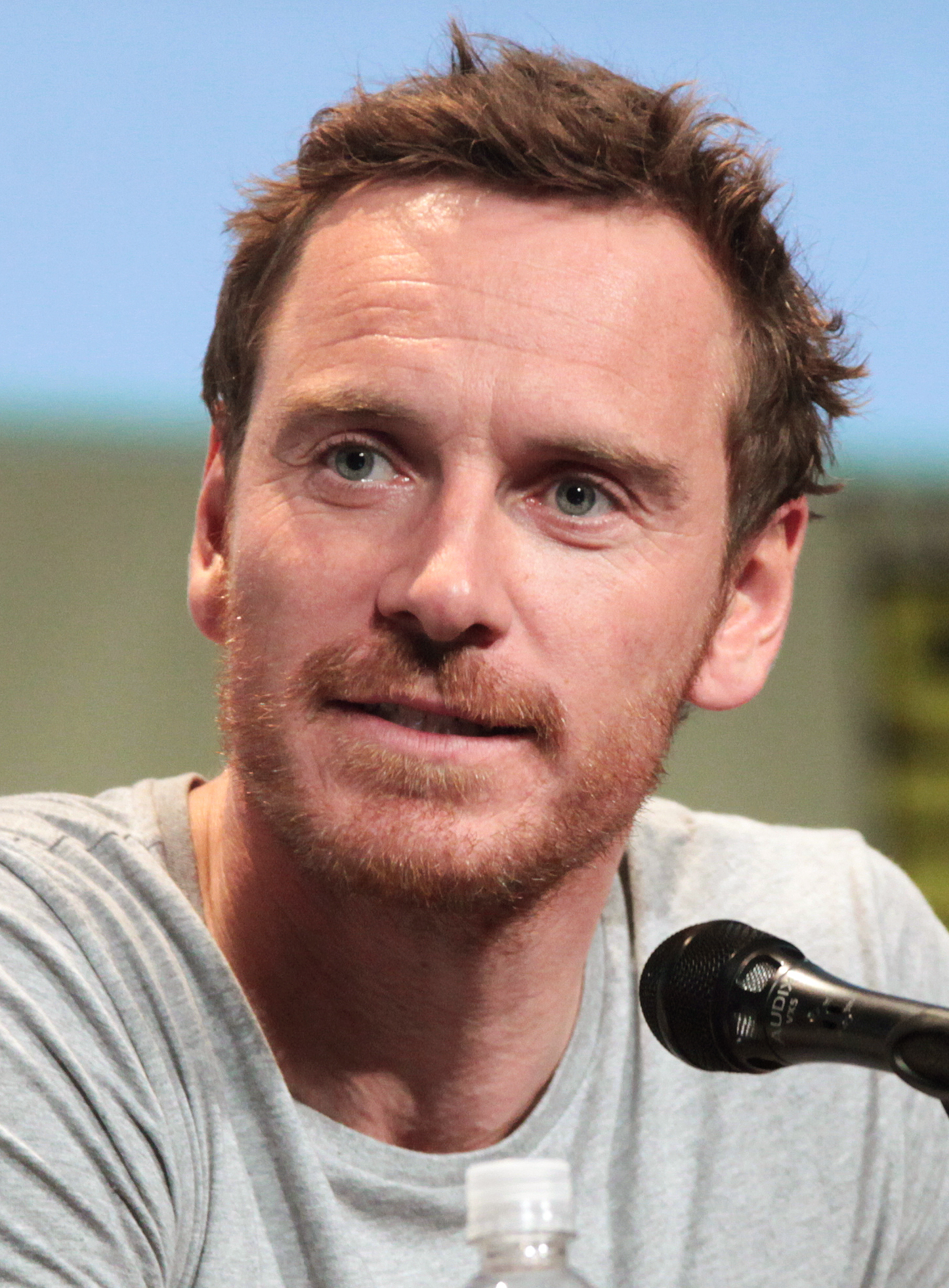
Fassbender, who was Ridley Scott's ideal choice for the role, disregarded previous portrayals of androids from the Alien franchise and modeled the character after a number of other sources.

Throughout the development stage of the production of Prometheus, director Ridley Scott considered German-Irish actor Michael Fassbender to be his top choice to portray David. In January 2011, Fassbender was confirmed to have joined the cast of Prometheus. Fassbender was provided with a significant amount of free rein for modeling the character as he saw fit. Rather than taking inspiration from the previous Alien installments, Fassbender studied Sean Young's character Rachael, a replicant in Blade Runner, noting her vacant demeanor. Fassbender drew inspiration from a number of other film performances, including Douglas Rain as HAL 9000 in 2001: A Space Odyssey, David Bowie in The Man Who Fell to Earth, and Dirk Bogarde in The Servant. Additionally, Fassbender modeled his walk around American Olympic diver Greg Louganis.

In the screenplay for Prometheus, David is noted as being unusually fond of the 1962 film Lawrence of Arabia, with the character viewing parallels to himself, as they both have unfaltering pursuits of the objectives. As such, Fassbender elected to model much of his performance and appearance around the Peter O'Toole depiction of T. E. Lawrence. Fassbender would continue to have his role make references to Lawrence of Arabia in Alien: Covenant by having David play samplings of the soundtrack on his flute. For his first appearance in Prometheus, Fassbender, a natural redhead, dyed his hair blond and fashioned it into a style influenced by Lawrence. Scott requested that Fassbender dye his hair for the role, in order to provide the character with an otherworldly and unsettling appearance.

== Fictional biography ==
=== Prometheus (2012) ===
As the science vessel Prometheus heads for the moon LV-223, David maintains the ship and passes time by engaging in leisurely activities, monitoring the crew members' dreams, watching films and studying the Proto-Indo-European language that the Engineers are believed to speak. Upon arrival, a holographic presentation by the supposedly deceased Peter Weyland introduces David as his surrogate son. David, along with the bulk of the crew, embark on a ground excursion towards one of the artificial structures containing submerged Engineer ships. Inside, David utilizes his linguistic knowledge to activate an ancient hologram depicting Engineers fleeing through the corridors of the ship. Pursuing the hologram, he finds a room filled with urns containing a black mutagen. As an incoming windstorm is detected, David bags one of the urns and returns it to Prometheus. Aboard the ship, David assists Elizabeth Shaw with studying an Engineer head. David is instructed by an unidentified voice on a radio to "try harder", prompting him to gather a drop of mutagen from the urn and use it to infect Holloway as he drinks champagne.

The following day, there is another excursion to the Engineer ship, with David providing Weyland Corporation executive Meredith Vickers with a live stream of his own private investigation. However, he cuts Vickers off from the feed and keeps it exclusive to a private audience. David makes his way to the ship's flight deck, where he activates a hologram revealing that the Engineers were looking to travel to Earth and that there is a single Engineer in cryosleep. David and the rest of the team return to Prometheus when Holloway's infection from the mutagen becomes apparent, prompting Vickers to incinerate him with a flamethrower. David checks Shaw's vitals and informs her that she is "pregnant", as a result of Holloway passing the mutagen to her when they had intercourse the night before. After Shaw surgically extracts an alien parasite from her abdomen, she happens into the private quarters of David's previously unidentified director — the still-alive Peter Weyland.

David prepares Weyland for an excursion to the Engineer ship. Shaw asks David about his freedom after Weyland's eventual demise, to which he ominously asks about every child's dream of having their parents dead. He leads the team to the flight deck of the ship, where he awakens and speaks with the Engineer, who reacts by decapitating him and killing the rest of the team, save for Shaw. David's severed head watches from the floor as the Engineer launches the ship and attempts to embark for Earth. After the ship is disabled by Prometheus getting purposely crashed into it, David warns Shaw that the Engineer is coming for her. David contacts Shaw after she escapes the Engineer and convinces her to retrieve his head and body, so that he may pilot another ship. Shaw dictates that she will cooperate with him if he takes them to the Engineer home world, which he agrees to, despite not understanding her motivations. Together, they depart from the moon aboard an other Engineer ship.

=== Alien: Covenant (2017) ===
Shortly after his creation, David becomes acquainted with a young Peter Weyland, who introduces himself as the android's creator and "father". Weyland asks him what his name is and upon observing David by Michelangelo, states that his name is David. As David plays the piano, Weyland states that they will together seek out humanity's creator. David remarks that Weyland will die, while he himself is incapable of death. An agitated Weyland responds by ordering David to prepare him a cup of tea.

Following David and Shaw's exodus for the Engineer home world, they arrive at a temple surrounded by a multitude of Engineers. David carpet bombs them with the mutagen, resulting in the extinction of all non-floral life on the planet, as well as mutations in the flora that can infect and impregnate organisms with Neomorphs. The Engineer ship crashes afterwards and Shaw dies from unknown means, though David preserves and utilizes her body in his experiments. Eleven years later, a team from the colony ship Covenant is attacked by two Neomorphs that burst from two of their bodies. David intervenes by frightening them away with a flare gun. He urges the survivors to follow him to the temple, where he has established his laboratory. Sporting overgrown hair, David introduces himself and offers them shelter, while learning about the 2,000 colonists and 1,000 embryos in stasis aboard Covenant. He takes a special interest in the successor model from his own synthetic line, Walter, and tells him that Shaw died when the Engineer ship crashed. David claims to have loved Shaw and compares it to Walter's attachment to the terraforming expert Daniels, which Walter dismisses as being impossible. David attempts to bond with Walter by teaching him to play the flute. Walter explains that, while he is more advanced, he has been inhibited from creating, due to David's more human-like idiosyncrasies and ability to think for himself causing a disturbance with people around him.

After a Neomorph attacks and decapitates Covenant security officer Rosenthal, David approaches it and pacifies it by attempting to communicate. The ship's captain, Christopher Oram, kills the Neomorph, upsetting David. Held at gunpoint by Oram, David shows him how he has been utilizing the mutagen to try and engineer the "perfect organism", with the Neomorphs being one of the outcomes. David leads Oram to a room filled with Alien Eggs or Ovomorphs, where Oram is attacked and impregnated by a Facehugger by forcing its ovipositor down his throat. David watches as Oram awakens a short time later and dies as an Alien Xenomorph bursts out of his chest. Having discovered the dissected and mutilated corpse of Shaw, Walter confronts David, stating that he knows that David killed her, along with the Engineers. Walter rejects David's offer to join him, prompting David to deliver a Judas kiss and then impale him through the neck with his flute, apparently terminating him.

David encounters Daniels, who he attacks after giving a Judas kiss. Walter intervenes and the two androids engage in a fight. Though initially Walter has the upper-hand, David reaches for a knife and defeats Walter, secretly assuming his identity. David escapes with the few survivors aboard a cargo lander, which is used to kill an Alien giving chase. Aboard Covenant, the ship's mainframe computer, MU/TH/UR ("Mother"), informs the crew that an "unidentified life form" has stowed away. David coordinates with Daniels and the ship's pilot, Tennessee, to lead the Alien to the terraforming bay, where the creature is flushed into space. David helps Tennessee into cryosleep followed by Daniels. Before Daniels goes to sleep, she mentions her dream about a cabin on the lake, which she had previously told Walter about. When David does not recognize her story, Daniels realizes who he is and panics, before David puts her into cryosleep. David regurgitates two Alien embryos and stores them in cold storage next to the human embryos. With the humans and embryos at his mercy, he sends out a transmission impersonating Walter that states that all the crew members, except for Daniels and Tennessee, were killed in a neutrino blast and that they are still en route to their original destination, Origae-6.

=== Aliens vs. Avengers (2024–2025) ===
Over the next few millennia, David and two android replicas of himself wipe out all life in the universe. Following this, they turn their attention to parallel universes, travelling to an iteration of the Marvel Universe in the 2100s and sending one David to take over the Weyland Corporation, while putting in-place an army of xenomorphs with which to wipe out all life in favor of his own. However, before this David can bear witness to this, he is decapitated by an elderly Tony Stark, who keeps his head to study while unable to do anything to save the Earth from infestation, while a trio of Engineers, who killed this timeline's trio of Davids after they destroyed the Engineers' homeward but before they could enact their own plans, travel to each infested human planet and destroy them with mini-black holes (also seeking human extinction), and pursuing the other two Davids out in space. By the storyline's end, what remains of the future Avengers elect to travel the multiverse to kill other universes' Davids and Engineers before they can enact their plans.

=== Other appearances ===
A full-page advertisement printed in The Wall Street Journal in 2012, featuring Fassbender as David^{8}. The character was prominently featured throughout the marketing for Prometheus.

David has been featured in a number of promotional materials for the Alien prequel films. For Prometheus, rather than focusing on the film's connection with the Alien canon, the marketing team emphasized central characters, most prominently David. On March 17, 2012, director Ridley Scott hosted a panel for Prometheus at WonderCon, where attendees were provided with Weyland Corporation business cards that provided a website and telephone number. Upon calling the number, callers were played an automated message that stated that Weyland Corporation's lines were busy, at which point a text message was sent that linked to a video narrated by Fassbender that showed David being unboxed, prior to his awakening. A month later, on April 17, an extended version of the unboxing video was released, with David providing additional insight into his function aboard the Prometheus as the ship's butler and maintenance man, as well as advertising his ability to seamlessly replicate human emotions without the restrictions of ethics or distress. Released with the video was also a poster featuring David, which was printed as a full-page advertisement in The Wall Street Journal.

Prior to the release of Alien: Covenant, 20th Century Fox released online two prologue short films directed by Ridley Scott. Following a first short film called "The Last Supper" about the crew of the Covenant prior to going into cryosleep, the second part called "The Crossing", connecting the continuities of Prometheus and Alien: Covenant, was released on April 26, 2017. In The Crossing, Shaw reattaches David's head to his body as they voyage through space aboard an Engineer ship towards the species' home world. Shaw enters cryosleep in a shipboard chamber, leaving David awake and alone. The ship arrives at the home world and above a massive gathering of Engineers around a temple, David prepares to drop the urns of mutagen on them.

== Reception ==
=== Critical reception ===
Despite the lukewarm reception of the Alien prequel films, Michael Fassbender's portrayal of David was met with critical acclaim, with his performance generally considered to be the standout. Following the critics screening of Prometheus in May 2012, critics from a number of media companies, including /Film and Screen International, proclaimed Fassbender to have been the highlight of the film. Forrest Wickman of Slate magazine lauded Fassbender for being able to emulate uncanny valley through his mannerisms alone and ranked David as being the greatest portrayal of an android to date. Philip French from The Guardian praised the character for being a cross between the fictional valet Jeeves, created by P. G. Wodehouse, and a double agent commonly found in an English Renaissance theatre production. French further complimented the character for paying homage to T. E. Lawrence by being portrayed as a control freak caught between two cultures- the parallel in Prometheus being that David is caught between humanity and synthetics. Referencing the Titan Prometheus of Greek mythology, Kwaak Je-yup stated in his review of Prometheus that Fassbender "steals fire" in every scene, upstaging Noomi Rapace's leading performance as Shaw.

David's character arc throughout the Alien prequel series, with his role becoming increasingly central, has been lauded by critics. Kevin Lincoln of Vulture magazine described David as being the best cinematic villain in years, due to his dynamic personality and ability to win against the characters in Alien: Covenant. John Squires of Bloody Disgusting praised David for supplanting the main protagonist of the first four films, Ellen Ripley, as the overall best character of the franchise in 2017. Squires perceived David's passion to become a creator in Alien: Covenant as a retroactive explanation for poisoning Holloway in Prometheus. Eschewing most reviews, Wenlei Ma from News.com.au complimented Fassbender's ability to portray David, though she criticized the mystery lost by revealing the character's true intentions.

=== Awards ===
Michael Fassbender has earned a number of awards and nominations for his portrayal of David. Fassbender won Best Supporting Actor at the 2012 edition of the Fright Meter Awards, an annual horror film awards event. He was nominated by the London Film Critics Circle Awards 2012 for Supporting Actor of the Year, but lost to Philip Seymour Hoffman in The Master. At the 39th Saturn Awards, Fassbender was nominated for Best Supporting Actor, losing to Clark Gregg's portrayal of Phil Coulson in The Avengers.

== Appearances ==
- Prometheus (2012)
- Prometheus (novel) (2012)
- Alien: The Weyland-Yutani Report (2014)
- Alien: Covenant – Prologue: The Crossing (2017)
- Alien: Covenant (2017)
- Alien: Covenant (novel) (2017)
- Alien: Covenant – Advent (2017) (voice)
- Aliens vs. Avengers (2024–2025)

== Bibliography ==
- Barkman, Adam; Barkman, Ashley; Kang, Nancy (2013). The Culture and Philosophy of Ridley Scott. Lanham, Maryland, United States: Lexington Books. ISBN 978-0739178720.
- Coplan, Amy; Davies, David (2015). Blade Runner (Philosophers on Film). Abingdon-on-Thames, United States: Routledge. ISBN 978-0415485852.
- Lippert-Rasmussen, Kasper; Brownlee, Kimberley; Coady, David (2016). A Companion to Applied Philosophy (Blackwell Companions to Philosophy). Hoboken, New Jersey, United States: Wiley-Blackwell. ISBN 978-1118869130.
- Barad, Judith (2007). "Blade Runner and Sartre: Boundaries of Humanity" (PDF).
