= Neverland (Alien: Earth) =

- Alien: Earth episode
- Episode no.: Season 1 Episode 1
- Directed by: Noah Hawley
- Written by: Noah Hawley
- Cinematography by: Dana Gonzales
- Editing by: Regis Kimble
- Original air date: August 12, 2025
- Running time: 63 minutes

Guest appearances
- Richa Moorjani as Zaveri; Sandra Yi Sencindiver as Yutani; Kit Young as Tootles; Lloyd Everitt as Hoyt; Amir Boutrous as Rahim; Karen Aldridge as Chibuzo; Michael Smiley as Shmuel; Jamie Bisping as Malachite; Andy Yu as Teng; Max Rinehart as Bronski; Enzo Cilenti as Petrovich; Tom Moya as Clem

Episode chronology
← Previous —	Next → "Mr. October"

"Neverland" is the series premiere of the American science fiction horror television series Alien: Earth, part of the Alien franchise. Written and directed by series creator Noah Hawley, the episode aired on FX on August 12, 2025, and was released on FX on Hulu on the same day.

The series is set in 2120, two years before the events of the original 1979 film Alien. It focuses on the space vessel Maginot crash-landing on Earth, where a young woman and a ragtag group of tactical soldiers make a discovery that puts them face-to-face with the planet's biggest threat.

According to Nielsen Media Research, the episode was seen by an estimated 0.589 million household viewers and gained a 0.11 ratings share among adults aged 18–49. Disney reported that the episode attracted 9.2 million views globally within its first six days of streaming. The series premiere received highly positive reviews from critics, who praised Hawley's directing, performances, and production values.

== Plot ==
In 2120, the Maginot, a research vessel from deep space belonging to the Weyland-Yutani Corporation, is on a 65-year mission to obtain zoological specimens from different planets for scientific research. After a short break, the crew return to their stasis chambers. Soon afterwards, the vessel comes under attack when the specimens break free. Security officer Kumi Morrow, a cyborg, reports that all other crew members have perished. After ignoring their pleas for help, Morrow locks himself in the vessel's impact room moments before colliding with Earth.

On Earth, the Prodigy Corporation conducts experiments at the "Neverland" Research Island. The young CEO, Boy Kavalier, oversees a successful procedure that transfers the consciousness of Marcy Hermit, a terminally ill 11-year-old girl, into a synthetic body, creating a hybrid. Marcy is given the name "Wendy" by Kavalier, who harbours an obsession with the story of Peter Pan and its concepts of agelessness and immortality. As Wendy adjusts to her new body, she assists Kavalier and behavioural therapist Dame Sylvia with the creation of new hybrids: Slightly, Curly, Nibs, Smee, and Tootles, nicknamed the "Lost Boys".

The Maginot crashes into the Prodigy city of New Siam. Wendy's human brother Joe, a Prodigy paramilitary medic who believes his sister died from her illness, is assigned to a search and rescue team. Morrow emerges and attempts to secure the area until Joe's team board the ship. Two soldiers, Hoyt and Anant, reach the laboratory, with Hoyt unaware that a leech-like specimen has made its way into his armor. Morrow intercepts both soldiers and forces them to handcuff themselves to a pole, while he leaves to search for the Xenomorph. While watching a news report, Wendy sees Joe and convinces Kavalier to let her inspect the crash site, but the latter assigns synthetic science officer Kirsh to monitor her.

On their way to the crash site, Wendy and Kirsh discuss both the faults and potential of the human race, with Wendy revealing she is determined to save her brother. Unable to escape, Hoyt and Anant are attacked and killed by the leeches, which feed on their blood. Joe and his team locate the stasis chambers, finding the crew's corpses. They follow a trail of blood, failing to notice a dead Facehugger. As the ship begins to collapse, the doors seal shut, locking them inside.

== Production ==
=== Development ===
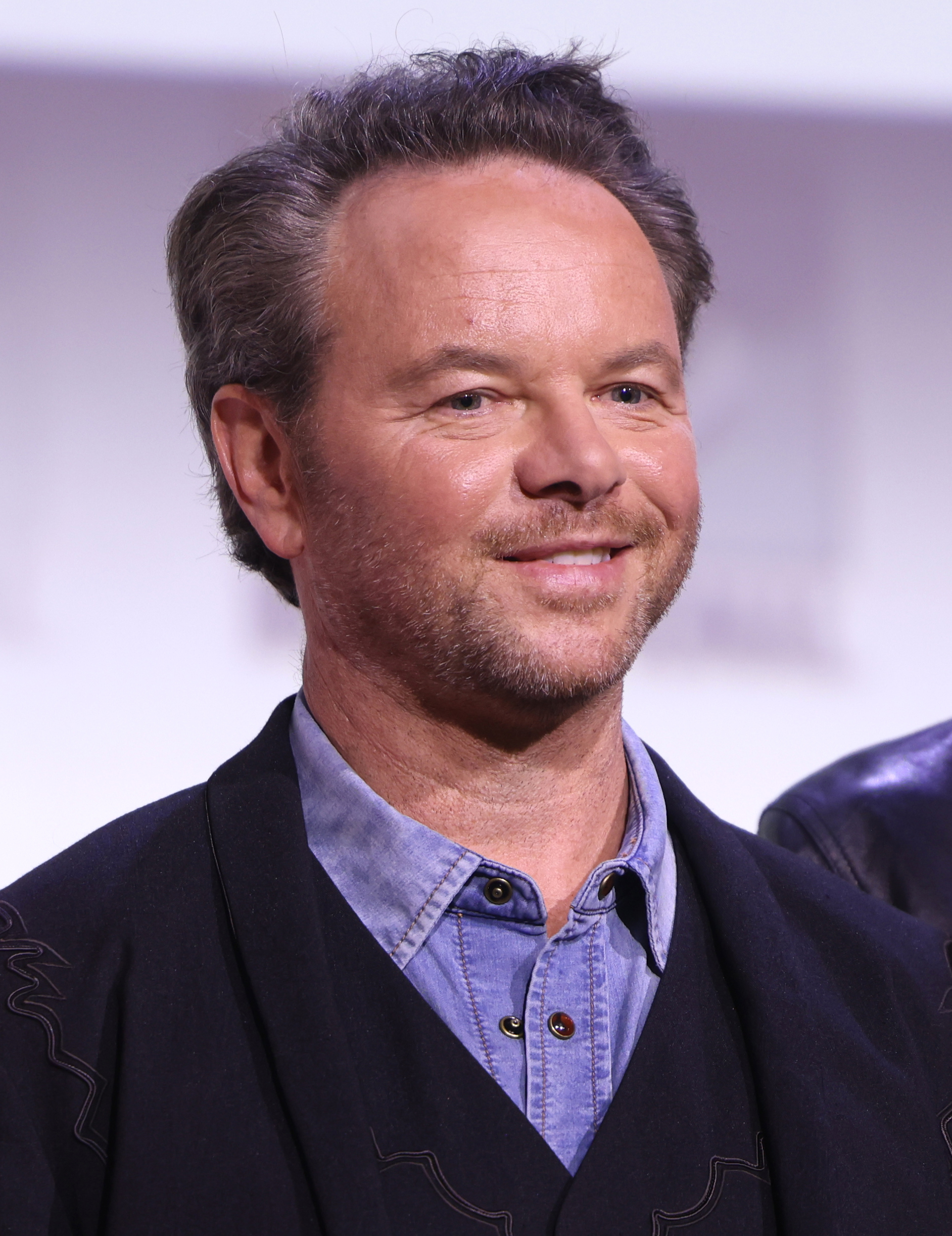
Series creator Noah Hawley wrote and directed the episode.

In July 2025, FX announced that the first episode of the first season of Alien: Earth would be titled "Neverland", and that it would be written and directed by series creator Noah Hawley, marking his first credits for the series.

=== Casting ===
Hawley makes a cameo appearance, as the father of Wendy and Hermit in a short flashback sequence. Hawley's son, Lev, played young Hermit, and he decided to act in the scene to help him. He said, "It was very meaningful for me. I joked about artisanal earlier, but I make these things personally, and it felt meaningful to put myself in it, with my son, and say, ‘This is a personal document for me. It's not just a crass act of commercialism.’"

== Reception ==
=== Viewers ===
In its original American broadcast on FX, "Neverland" was seen by an estimated 0.589 million household viewers with a 0.11 in the 18–49 demographics. This means that 0.11 percent of all households with televisions watched the episode.

Disney announced that the episode attracted 9.2 million views globally within its first six days of streaming.

=== Critical reviews ===
"Neverland" received positive reviews from critics. Clint Gage of IGN wrote, "A lot of ink has been spilled about how this fits in with the franchise and which parts of the canon are being accounted for. But this opening sequence is crafted in such a way that Hawley and his team are saying “yes” to all of it. There is a familiar setting, in a familiar timeline, but they're doing some new things within that structure."

Matt Schimkowitz of The A.V. Club gave the 2-episode premiere a "B–" grade and wrote, "With “Neverland,” Hawley, again, looks beyond the title and splits the difference between Scott's beloved sci-fi masterpieces, Alien and Blade Runner, offering a ruthlessly efficient remake of the former and the childlike, electric dreams of the latter."

Alan Sepinwall of Rolling Stone wrote, "Primarily, though, “Neverland” is concerned with Hawley's major concepts for the series: the ongoing battle for supremacy among the five corporations that control the planet, and their race to perfect a form of immortality before the competition can."

Noel Murray of Vulture gave the episode a perfect 5 star out of 5 rating and wrote, "Writer-producer Noah Hawley's new Alien: Earth quickly finds its own lane, with an opening episode that is one of the best chapter ones of a TV series that I've seen in a good long while." Shawn Van Horn of Collider gave the episode a 9 out of 10 rating and wrote, "They live, and then they die. Wendy doesn't want to hear that, though, because her brother isn't going to die. She's going to save him. With that, Alien: Earth has introduced its new badass heroine."

Eric Francisco of Esquire wrote, "In its kick-off episode, Alien: Earth may not offer more than the most essential who, what, where, and when—and certainly the "why" is how it plans to keep us interested until the finale. But as a whole new TV show that wears the menacing skin of a familiar franchise, Alien: Earth makes a great first impression, and that "Play Next Episode" button is harder to resist than a facehugger to the mug." Johnny Loftus of Decider wrote, "With the slow turning title cards and clean, eerie music cues, its matching film stock, the look and feel of the ship, the crew's uniforms – even the typeface of the close-captioning – Alien: Earth in these early scenes is bringing its franchise's past into its present."

Sean T. Collins of The New York Times wrote, "The year is 2120, and the planet is controlled by five gigantic, unaccountable corporations? Perhaps the Earth part of Alien: Earth doesn't sound so far-fetched. The Alien element, however, remains gloriously alien." Paul Dailly of TV Fanatic gave the episode a perfect 5 star out of 5 rating and wrote, "The most impressive part? This doesn't feel like TV. The production design, the soundscape, the way the camera lingers in tight spaces until you're ready to claw your way out — it's pure cinematic tension."

=== Accolades ===
Award	Category	Recipient(s)	Result	Ref.
American Society of Cinematographers	Episode of a One-Hour Regular Series	Dana Gonzales	Nominated	
Art Directors Guild Awards	One-Hour Fantasy Single-Camera Series	Andy Nicholson	Nominated	
Environmental Media Awards	Drama Series	"Neverland"	Nominated	
Golden Reel Awards	Outstanding Achievement in Sound Editing – Broadcast Long Form Effects / Foley	Various (Note: Lee Gilmore, Brad North, Beso Kacharava, Nolan McNaughton, Justin Davey, Chris Terhune, Craig Henighan, Tim Walston, Matt "Smokey" Cloud, Albert Romero, Alexander Sanikidze, Rati Chkhetiani, Levan Tserediani, Biko Gogaladze, Stefan Fraticelli, Brandon Bak, and Jason Charbonneau)	Won	
Primetime Creative Arts Emmy Awards	Outstanding Cinematography for a Series (One Hour)	Dana Gonzales	Pending	
Primetime Creative Arts Emmy Awards	Outstanding Fantasy/Sci-Fi Costumes	Various (Note: Suttirat Larlarb, Pashelle Latino, Srirattana "Bew" Wattanavitkul, and Ampa "Tiew" Bunruaeng)	Pending	
Primetime Creative Arts Emmy Awards	Outstanding Sound Editing for a Comedy or Drama Series (One Hour)	Various (Note: Lee Gilmore, Bradley North, Chris Terhune, Nolan McNaughton, Justin M. Davey, Byron Wilson, Tim Walston, Matt "Smokey" Cloud, Beso Kacharava, Ben Schor, and Biko Gogaladze)	Pending	
