= Mr. October (Alien: Earth) =

- Alien: Earth episode
- Episode no.: Season 1 Episode 2
- Directed by: Dana Gonzales
- Written by: Noah Hawley
- Cinematography by: David Franco
- Editing by: Regis Kimble
- Original air date: August 12, 2025
- Running time: 55 minutes

Guest appearances
- Sandra Yi Sencindiver as Yutani; Kit Young as Tootles; Amir Boutrous as Rahim; Karen Aldridge as Chibuzo; David Bark-Jones as Wealthy Resident; Lloyd Everitt as Hoyt; Jamie Bisping as Malachite

Episode chronology
← Previous "Neverland"	Next → "Metamorphosis"

"Mr. October" is the second episode of the American science fiction horror television series Alien: Earth, part of the Alien franchise. Written by series creator Noah Hawley and directed by executive producer Dana Gonzales, it aired on FX along with the series premiere "Neverland" on August 12, 2025, and was released on FX on Hulu on the same day.

The series is set in 2120, two years before the events of the original 1979 film Alien. It focuses on the space vessel Maginot crash-landing on Earth, where a young woman and a ragtag group of tactical soldiers make a discovery that puts them face-to-face with the planet's biggest threat. In the episode, Wendy and the Lost Boys venture into the ship and tower to rescue Hermit, who must evade the loose xenomorph in the area.

According to Nielsen Media Research, the episode was seen by an estimated 0.380 million household viewers and gained a 0.07 ratings share among adults aged 18–49. The episode received highly positive reviews from critics, with high praise towards the production design and xenomorph scenes.

== Plot ==
Joe and his squad continue through the crashed ship, reaching an adjacent residential tower that has been damaged by the crash. A xenomorph attacks Joe, separating him from his squad. Fleeing from the creature, he hides in an elevator, but he is unable to broadcast an emergency signal.

Boy tells Dame Sylvia that he formed the Hybrid project to compete with artificial intelligence, and has granted Wendy additional abilities as he wishes to create a person smarter than him. He is contacted by Weyland-Yutani CEO Ms. Yutani herself, who requests his permission to secure the Maginot's proprietary contents, but he refuses, warning any incursion on his territory will be considered a hostile act. Wendy, Kirsh and the Lost Boys arrive at the crash site, forcing their way into the ship and tower. Inspecting the lab, Tootles, Smee, Nibs, and Curly discover the leech-like creatures as well as a small, octopus-like parasite, which emerges from the skull of a cat it had attached itself to and attacks Nibs. They struggle to contain it until Kirsh arrives and traps it.

Joe makes his way through the tower, reuniting with one of his soldiers. They try to warn the residents of the threat, but they refuse to leave the premises. The xenomorph kills the soldier and several residents, then attacks Joe. It is tasered by Morrow, who also tasers Joe before taking the unconscious creature. Soldiers stop Morrow and handcuff him, but they are subsequently killed by the awakened xenomorph, which spares Morrow before fleeing.

Wendy and Slightly explore the tower, eventually finding Joe. As they make their way back to the ship, Slightly exposes Wendy's real identity to Joe. He is shocked, but relieved to be reunited with his sister. The three encounter several xenomorph eggs and are ordered by Kirsh to contain them until a HazMat team arrives. They accidentally activate an alarm, alerting the xenomorph. It abducts Joe, and Wendy leaves Slightly to supervise the eggs while she leaves to save her brother.

== Production ==
=== Development ===
In July 2025, FX announced that the second episode of the first season of Alien: Earth would be titled "Mr. October", (Note: The episode is titled after American baseball player Reggie Jackson, nicknamed "Mr. October", whose name appears on an autographed baseball in a room in the residential tower.) and that it would be written by series creator Noah Hawley, and directed by executive producer Dana Gonzales. This marked Hawley's second writing credit, and Gonzales' first directing credit.

== Reception ==
=== Viewers ===
In its original American broadcast, "Mr. October" was seen by an estimated 0.380 million household viewers with a 0.07 in the 18–49 demographics. This means that 0.07 percent of all households with televisions watched the episode. This was a 36% decrease in viewership from the previous episode, which was seen by an estimated 0.589 million household viewers with a 0.11 in the 18–49 demographics.

=== Critical reviews ===
"Mr. October" received positive reviews from critics. Clint Gage of IGN wrote, "Premiere episodes have become something of a lost art. As seasons of streaming series get shorter and shorter, it's good to see Alien: Earth come out swinging with a two-episode drop that features all the iconic creepiness we've come to expect from the franchise, paired with the promise of something new. Meeting a host of brand new characters, human, synthetic, alien and a bunch of Lost Boys that are something in between, Noah Hawley and his cast and crew have launched a very intriguing new show in a franchise in need of an evolution."

Matt Schimkowitz of The A.V. Club gave the 2-episode premiere a "B–" grade and wrote, "“Mr. October” director Dana Gonzales isn't the first person to struggle to make the monster scary after 1979. Still, it is a persistent issue within the episode, which lacks tension despite the preponderance of monsters stalking the building."

Alan Sepinwall of Rolling Stone wrote, "Hermit reunites with Wendy — or, as he knows her, Marcy — by the end of “Mr. October”, but the reunion's not peaceful for very long, as the Xenomorph crashes in and grabs Hermit, and Wendy chooses to leap down into the wreckage of the building to save her brother. Will she succeed? Again, this is an ongoing TV show where she's the main character, so the shock of Dallas dying midway through the first film, when at one point he seemed like its protagonist, won't be repeated. But this is a pretty thrilling start to Hawley's new chapter in this old story."

Noel Murray of Vulture gave the episode a 4 star out of 5 rating and wrote, "On the whole, “Mr. October” isn't as satisfying an episode as “Neverland”, if only because the series premiere was packed with characters and ideas, while this episode plays more like a continuation of the action-horror scenes that ended episode one. This chapter doesn't tell its own story or introduce anything excitingly new. That said, those action-horror scenes are pleasurably icky." Shawn Van Horn of Collider gave the episode an 8 out of 10 rating and wrote, "Wendy tells Slightly to stay with the eggs as she runs off after Joe. She just got her brother back, and she's not about to lose him."

Eric Francisco of Esquire wrote, "I'm not sure what kind of bizarre Eyes Wide Shut activities were going on in there, but the Xenomorph racks up around twenty kills in a manner of seconds. Episode 2 is basically a hype video for the alien — and its the best this franchise has been in a long time." Johnny Loftus of Decider wrote, "With Episode 2, and Weyland-Yutani's research vessel falling out of the sky and landing on a city owned by Prodigy, its corporate competitor, W‑Y's precious deep space cargo is now loose at the crash site, and already providing direct scares of the body cavity-filling, face-attaching Alien franchise variety."

Sean T. Collins of The New York Times wrote, "None of this is to say the show feels derivative. A product of its influences? Of course — this is franchise filmmaking. But Hawley's homages are laser-precise. And they make use of techniques rarely seen on big-budget TV, like the leisurely zooms of 1970s cinema. Hawley brings his own penchant for dreamy montage to the proceedings as well, adding an aesthetic ingredient that is new to the setting." Paul Dailly of TV Fanatic gave the episode a perfect 5 star out of 5 rating and wrote, "If the next six episodes can maintain this level of suspense, sharp character work, and corporate nastiness, Alien: Earth won't just be a good TV spinoff. It could be the best thing to happen to the franchise."
