= In Space, No One... =

- Alien: Earth episode
- Episode no.: Season 1 Episode 5
- Directed by: Noah Hawley
- Written by: Noah Hawley
- Cinematography by: Colin Watkinson
- Editing by: Regis Kimble
- Original air date: September 2, 2025
- Running time: 64 minutes

Guest appearances
- Richa Moorjani as Zoya Zaveri; Sandra Yi Sencindiver as Yutani; Amir Boutrous as Rahim; Karen Aldridge as Chibuzo; Michael Smiley as Shmuel; Jamie Bisping as Malachite; Andy Yu as Teng; Max Rinehart as Bronski; Enzo Cilenti as Petrovich; Tom Moya as Clem; Robin August as "Mother"

Episode chronology
← Previous "Observation"	Next → "The Fly"

"In Space, No One…" is the fifth episode of the American science fiction horror television series Alien: Earth, part of the Alien franchise. The episode was written and directed by series creator Noah Hawley. It aired on FX on September 2, 2025, and was released on FX on Hulu on the same day.

The series is set in 2120, two years before the events of the original 1979 film Alien. It focuses on the space vessel Maginot crash-landing on Earth, where a young woman and a ragtag group of tactical soldiers make a discovery that puts them face-to-face with the planet's biggest threat. In the episode, the events leading up to the crash of the Maginot are explored.

According to Nielsen Media Research, the episode was seen by an estimated 0.361 million household viewers and gained a 0.10 ratings share among adults aged 18–49. The episode received critical acclaim, with critics praising the episode's homage to Alien, performances, character development and tension.

== Plot ==
Seventeen days away from Earth, the Maginot experiences a fire in containment, prompting junior security officer Clem to wake up Morrow for help. He is taken to the med bay, where two facehuggers have attached themselves to two crew members, Captain Dinsdale and science officer Bronski. Dinsdale is revealed to have died from the facehugger's acidic blood after a failed attempt by medical officer Rahim to remove it. The facehuggers broke free from their capsules due to the fire, but the crew do not know how it started.

After engineer Shmuel informs him that the incident has put the Maginot at the risk of crashing, Morrow suspects that the ship was sabotaged and launches an investigation. Shmuel and his apprentice Malachite begin repairs on the ship's navigation system. While investigating, Morrow finds that Zoya Zaveri, the acting Captain, was having sex with Bronski. Morrow also receives the belongings of his daughter, who is revealed to have died in a house fire while at his mission. The crew places Bronski in cryogenic sleep with the facehugger, but the incubating chestburster manages to hatch and escape, killing him. Scientist Chibuzo researches the creatures, unaware that a leech-specimen has spread larvae in her water bottle. After she leaves to meet with the crew, the octopus-like creature, T. Ocellus, breaks free from its container.

Zaveri assembles the crew and informs them that a Xenomorph is on the loose. She also states that a fuel breach is causing their ship to collide with Earth, and that there is a saboteur on the ship. Before leaving to fix the engines, Malachite drinks from the water bottle. While working, he coughs up blood and loses consciousness. During an interrogation of navigator Teng, Morrow realizes that the saboteur could be among the crew members purportedly in cryosleep. Checking the video logs with the A.I. MU / TH / UR, Morrow finds an entry in which Chief Engineer Petrovich asks Boy Kavalier to upload his mind into a hybrid. Boy agrees, on the condition that he deliver the creatures to him by forcing the ship to crash-land in Prodigy territory.

Chibuzo and Rahim try to perform a surgery on Malachite, but he is revealed to carry flea-like creatures in his stomach, which have killed him. They release a toxin that kills them, forcing Zaveri to contain the bay. While alone, Teng is killed by the Xenomorph. Morrow and Clem search for Petrovich, who surprises them with a gun. He kills Clem, but Morrow kills Petrovich, while the leeches go to feast on Clem's body. The Xenomorph chases Zaveri to the bridge, although it is then attacked by Shmuel, who has been possessed by T. Ocellus, giving Zaveri time to flee. The Xenomorph gains the upper-hand and decapitates the possessed Shmuel, forcing T. Ocellus to abandon its now-useless host. Morrow seals himself in the control room while Zaveri is killed by the Xenomorph, locking himself in the panic room as it prepares to collide with Earth, narrowly escaping the Xenomorph himself.

On Earth, Morrow visits Yutani at her headquarters. He confirms the cargo survived and wants to help in retrieving it, promising to kill Boy in the process. Yutani, noting how fond her grandmother was of Morrow after taking him in off the street when he was a boy, accepts his terms.

== Production ==
=== Development ===
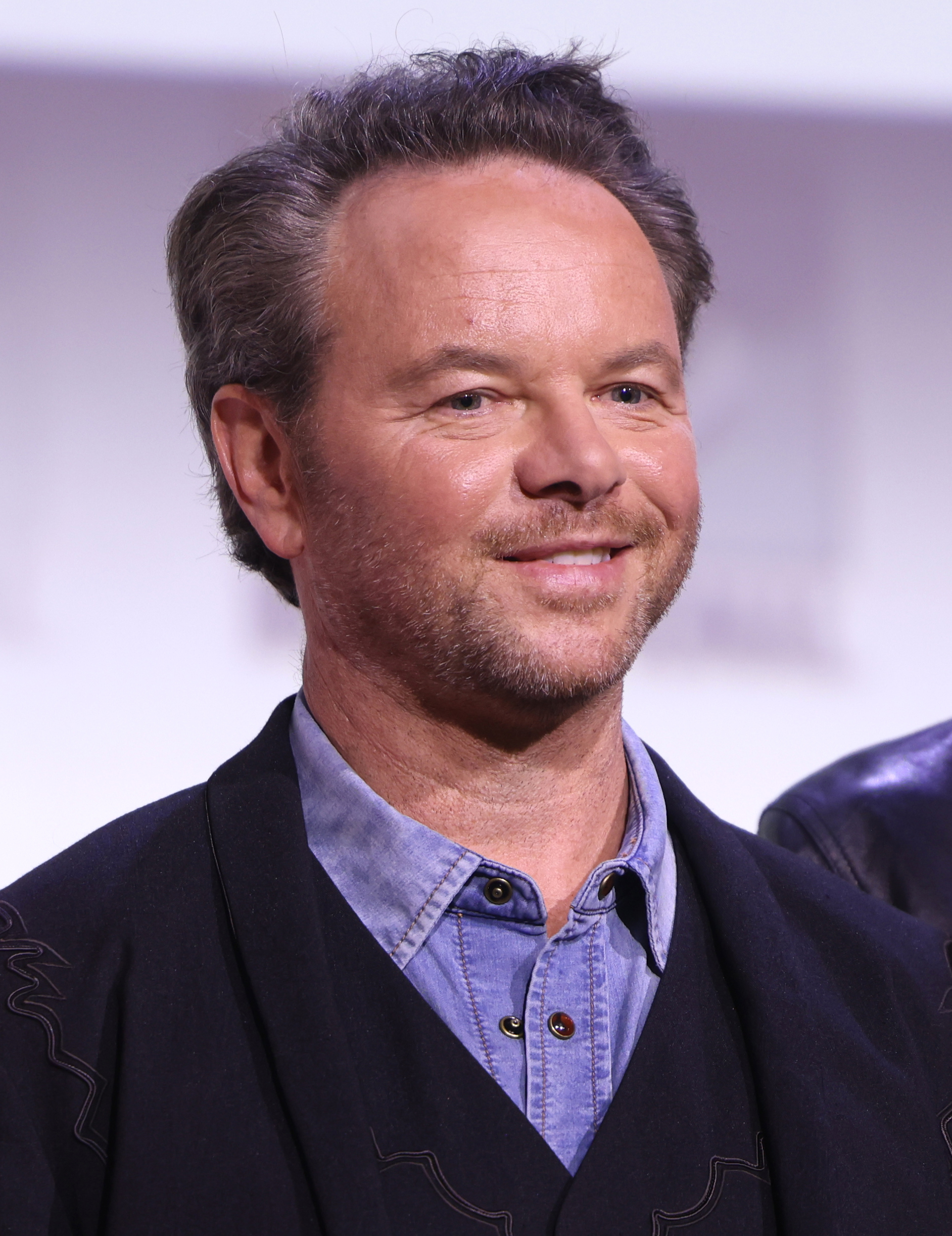
Series creator Noah Hawley wrote and directed the episode.

In August 2025, FX announced that the fifth episode of the season would be titled "In Space, No One…", and that it would be written and directed by series creator Noah Hawley. This marked Hawley's fifth writing credit and second directing credit.

The episode's title alludes to the tagline used for Alien, "In space, no one can hear you scream." When writing the episode, Hawley was adamant in directing it, "I wasn't about to hand the Alien movie within the season off to another director. That was my opportunity."

=== Writing ===
Hawley was interested in exploring the characters in the Maginot while also making his own homage to the original film, saying "This allowed me — in the middle of trying to innovate what [the Alien franchise could be as a series] — to also pick up the gauntlet for classic Alien to say, ‘We could do classic Alien and do it as well as anyone.' But what's interesting to me at the same time is adding all these new elements, and putting the creatures in this thematic context. It's the number of elements at play that make it fun to me. It's like by the time the xenomorph enters the story, you're six tragedies deep with these other creatures. Then the xenomorph arrives and it just escalates." He added, "You had this mystery about who sabotaged the ship, you had these three or four creatures that were all in play, and all of these stories were gonna collide in the last 15 minutes. It's thrilling, as an Alien fan, to see it escalate, to be invested, to have the slow build, the suspense of the mystery."

Babou Ceesay said he was very interested in exploring a new side of Morrow, "it suddenly made sense of some of the stuff we'd been discussing about Morrow having this warmer side. As unbelievable as that sounds, I thought, 'No, he has another side to him where there’s almost a moral compass.'" Richa Moorjani explained Zaveri's characterization, particularly over her death, "I think she feels so betrayed. Because her thing is she'll do whatever it takes to protect her crew. She's loyal and she cares about saving people. No man left behind. So when he does that to her, I think it is the ultimate betrayal because she would never have done that to him."

=== Production design ===
According to Hawley, the design of the USCSS Maginot was inspired by the Nostromo from the original Alien. He explained, "The first thing that you need to establish in translating something from film to television is authenticity. And so it has to feel like Alien. We have to show the audience, not only is this Alien, but it's Ridley Scott's Alien. It's James Cameron's. It's like that early, retro futurism. So everyone's very oriented as to what this is. Using the iconic ship was really important." Editor Robin August voices MU / TH / UR in the episode, an artificial intelligence who recurs across the Alien and Predator franchise, originally intended as a stand-in voice to be later recast, before being kept as the voice of the character.

=== Music ===
The soundtrack for the episode, composed by Jeff Russo, was released as a stand-alone album on September 2, 2025.

== Reception ==
=== Viewers ===
In its original American broadcast, "In Space, No One…" was seen by an estimated 0.361 million household viewers with a 0.10 in the 18–49 demographics. This means that 0.10 percent of all households with televisions watched the episode. This was a slight decrease in viewership from the previous episode, which was seen by an estimated 0.393 million household viewers with a 0.07 in the 18–49 demographics.

=== Critical reviews ===
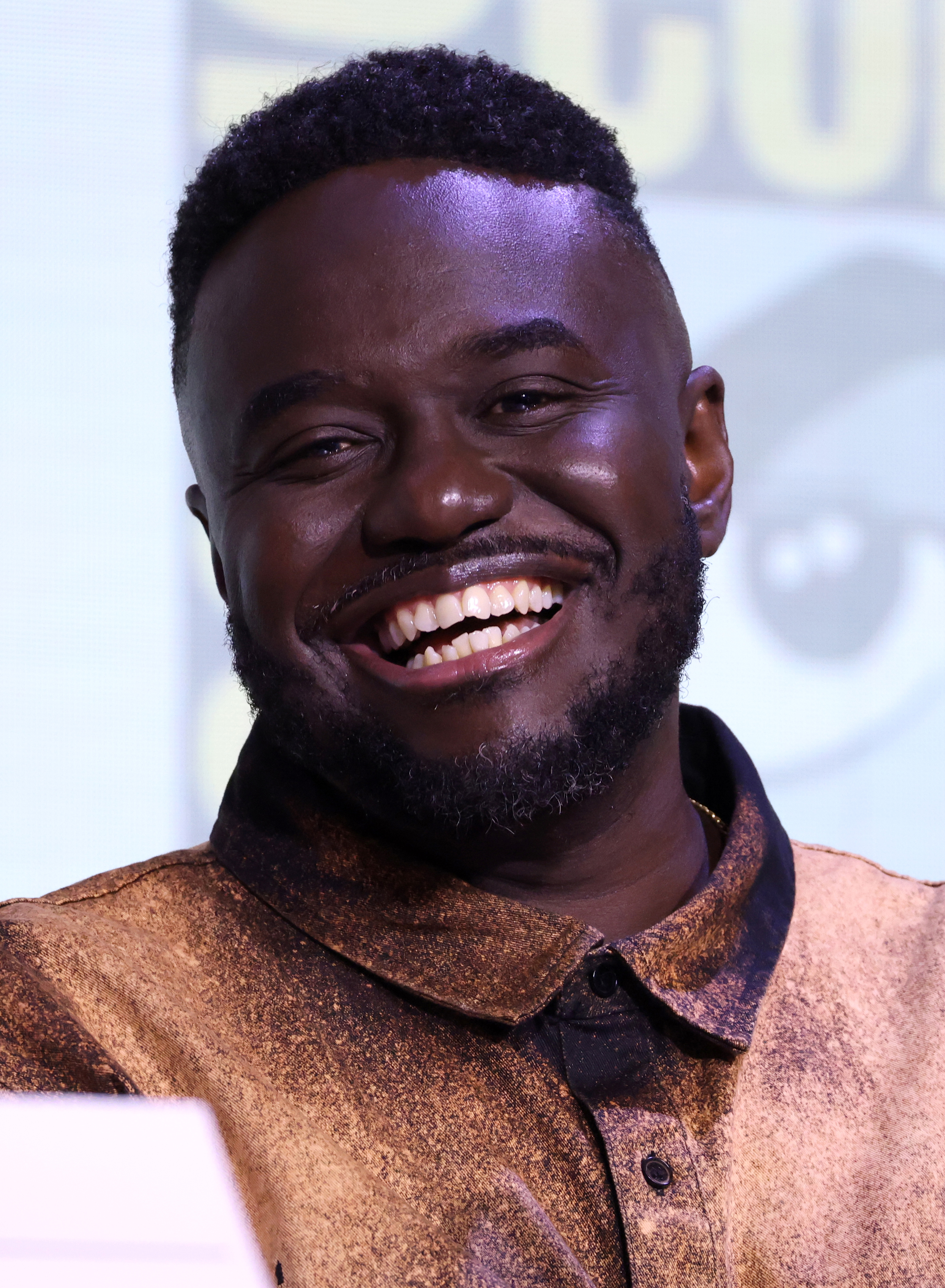
Babou Ceesay's performance was praised.

"In Space, No One…" received critical acclaim. Clint Gage of IGN gave the episode an "amazing" 9 out of 10 and wrote in his verdict, "Noah Hawley directs an episode that's largely a remake of Ridley Scott's original, stopping the main story of the Lost Boys on Neverland all together in favor of a flashback to the sabotage of the Maginot. But playing on all the familiarity to the 1979 classic that he can muster, the episode is an effective turning point in the season, reframing how we feel about the two primary antagonists of the show. It's a sharp piece of dramatic irony, a loving homage to its source material and a capable thriller on top of everything else."

Matt Schimkowitz of The A.V. Club gave the episode a "B+" grade and wrote, "Hawley establishes an efficient and economical simulacrum of Alien that builds on the pilot and undermines what typically happens in one of these movies. The result is less of a retread and more of a trial run, as if Maginot's failures informed Yutani's plans for the Nostromo."

Alan Sepinwall of Rolling Stone wrote, "“In Space, No One Can…” doesn't match the exquisite sense of terror and disgust generated by Ridley Scott and company, in part because we've had nearly 50 years of this franchise. But it’s scarier, creepier, and more exciting than anything deliberately echoing the original has any business being." Noel Murray of Vulture gave the episode a 4 star out of 5 rating and wrote, "The writer-director Hawley delivers an hourlong Alien cover version, stripping the original composition to the three elements he seems to find the most essential."

Eric Francisco of Esquire wrote, ""In Space, No One…" is simply what anyone ought to be looking for in an Alien television series. It hits all the same notes you expect from this series without simply regurgitating familiar moments. Alien: Earth is finding its own footing as an emotionally-charged saga where feelings like love and loss aren't totally meaningless in a cold, cruel, capital-driven world. Sometimes, they're the only things that can save us." Shawn Van Horn of Collider gave the episode a 9 out of 10 rating and wrote, "In a world of villains and monsters, Boy Kavalier is the biggest, and his time on Alien: Earth might not be long."

Mary Kassel of Screen Rant wrote, "Alien: Earth has been a thrill ride, but it hasn't shocked me yet, and I'm hoping that after "In Space, No One…" the show will feel comfortable making me think as much as it makes me squirm." Paul Dailly of TV Fanatic gave the episode a perfect 5 star out of 5 rating and wrote, "Rather than feeling like a peak, this hour proved that Alien: Earth is still climbing, layering its mythology with bold character work, suffocating horror, and emotionally devastating payoffs."
