= Metamorphosis (Alien: Earth) =

- Alien: Earth episode
- Episode no.: Season 1 Episode 3
- Directed by: Dana Gonzales
- Written by: Noah Hawley; Bob DeLaurentis
- Cinematography by: David Franco
- Editing by: Robin August
- Original air date: August 19, 2025
- Running time: 54 minutes

Guest appearances
- Sandra Yi Sencindiver as Yutani; Kit Young as Tootles

Episode chronology
← Previous "Mr. October"	Next → "Observation"

"Metamorphosis" is the third episode of the American science fiction horror television series Alien: Earth, part of the Alien franchise. The episode was written by series creator Noah Hawley and co-executive producer Bob DeLaurentis, and directed by executive producer Dana Gonzales. It aired on FX on August 19, 2025, and was released on FX on Hulu on the same day.

The series is set in 2120, two years before the events of the original 1979 film Alien. It focuses on the space vessel Maginot crash-landing on Earth, where a young woman and a ragtag group of tactical soldiers make a discovery that puts them face-to-face with the planet's biggest threat. In the episode, Wendy tries to rescue Joe from the Xenomorph, while Boy assigns Kirsh to retrieve all creatures for study.

According to Nielsen Media Research, the episode was seen by an estimated 0.441 million household viewers and gained a 0.10 ratings share among adults aged 18–49. The episode received highly positive reviews from critics, who praised the performances, tension, production values and intrigue.

== Plot ==
Boy Kavalier informs Kirsh that the rescue mission has changed, assigning him and the Lost Boys to secure the site and bring the aliens in for study. Upon learning that Wendy left to rescue Joe, Kavalier orders Kirsh to bring her in immediately.

Wendy finds Joe in a shipping container moments before they are both attacked by the Xenomorph, which wounds Joe. Wendy attempts to save him by locking it behind a blast door, but the alien pulls her in with it. When Joe opens the door, he finds that Wendy has beheaded the Xenomorph, but has sustained serious damage. They both lose consciousness.

At the Maginot, Slightly and Smee are held at gunpoint by Morrow, who transfers the ship's database to his body. Kirsh arrives to confront him, prompting Morrow to flee, with the others unaware that he planted a device in Slightly's neck. A Prodigy team arrives to retrieve some of the creatures, including the dead Xenomorph and its eggs, while Wendy and Joe remain in a coma. When Kirsh tells Kavalier that the Xenomorph eggs are triggered by the presence of desirable organic hosts, and that a Xenomorph face-hugger will emerge, attack and impregnate any human in its vicinity, Kavalier assigns Kirsh to secure the lab, allowing only synthetic beings inside, and puts him in charge of research.

Curly talks with Kavalier, admitting her frustrations with Wendy's status as his favorite, given she prioritized her brother over the mission. Kavalier implies she could become his new favorite if she studies, and becomes proficient in certain fields. Morrow contacts Yutani, stating that he plans to bring the creatures back. Later, he uses the device in Slightly's neck to talk to him, complimenting him and telling him he wants them to be friends.

Wendy undergoes extensive repairs. Upon regaining consciousness, she hears strange sounds, wandering through the underground labs looking for the source. At the same time, Joe undergoes surgery and is given a lung transplant. Kavalier keeps the damaged lung alive in a medical vat, pumping it with blood, and oxygen. Kirsh and Curly experiment on one of the eggs, carving out and incapacitating the facehugger. They dissect it, retrieving the Xenomorph embryo. During this procedure, Wendy, seemingly connected to the Xenomorph embryo, experiences a seizure and collapses again. Kirsh then drops the parasite embryo into the tank with Joe's lung, where it quickly burrows inside of it.

== Production ==
=== Development ===
In July 2025, FX announced that the third episode of the first season of Alien: Earth would be titled "Metamorphosis", and that it would be written by series creator Noah Hawley and co-executive producer Bob DeLaurentis, and directed by executive producer Dana Gonzales. This marked Hawley's third writing credit, DeLaurentis' first writing credit, and Gonzales' second directing credit.

=== Writing ===
Samuel Blenkin mentioned that Hawley used The Twilight Zone (1959-1964) episode "It's a Good Life" as his point of reference for Boy Kavalier's characterization in the episode. He says, "I don't think he ever has a question that he doesn't know best", further adding "He definitely thinks that he's doing good for the world. It's just in order to do good in the world, people need to get out of his fucking way".

Regarding Morrow's question of "when is a machine not a machine?", Hawley explained that the idea was to explore how a person believes himself to be human before realizing they could be a machine, and whether they can fit in that world. He added that the idea was further raised because the character lost his family and everyone he knew, "if being a machine means maybe you feel it all less, that would attractive to him."

== Reception ==
=== Viewers ===
In its original American broadcast, "Metamorphosis" was seen by an estimated 0.441 million household viewers with a 0.10 in the 18–49 demographics. This means that 0.10 percent of all households with televisions watched the episode. This was a 16% increase in viewership from the previous episode, which was seen by an estimated 0.380 million household viewers with a 0.07 in the 18–49 demographics.

=== Critical reviews ===
"Metamorphosis" received positive reviews from critics. Clint Gage of IGN gave the episode a "great" 8 out of 10 and wrote in his verdict, "The third episode of Alien: Earth continues playing to the strengths the two-episode premiere showed off last week. The aptly titled “Metamorphosis” is the best kind of transitional chapter, more quietly wrapping up threads introduced by the bigger, louder first episodes. Even though Hawley nearly overstayed his welcome on the Maginot, by the time we hear Metallica over the end credits, every character, every player in the drama unfolding adds a new flavor to the mix, as their trajectories start to take shape."

Matt Schimkowitz of The A.V. Club gave the episode a "B+" grade and wrote, "True to its name, “Metamorphosis” is a transformational episode that sends Alien: Earth into thrilling new directions. All it had to do was rip out the show's emotional spine. After two episodes focusing on Wendy's trip to Neverland, Hawley and co-writer Bob DeLaurentis make room for the rest of the Lost Boys, who are quick enough to recognize that they're half girls."

Alan Sepinwall of Rolling Stone wrote, "All of this is necessary world-building for the rest of the season's stories, after the first two episodes were so much about the siblings. But it can't always disguise its haste to get from all this set-up to the bigger stories yet to come."

Noel Murray of Vulture gave the episode a 4 star out of 5 rating and wrote, "What's happening here isn't exactly clear, nor is it necessarily intended to be. This whole concluding sequence is meant to look and sound like some weirdo mad scientist stuff, between the androids' cyberpunk goggles and the squishy noises the wriggling creatures make. It's supposed to penetrate our subconscious and creep us the hell out." Shawn Van Horn of Collider gave the episode a 9 out of 10 rating and wrote, "The xenomorph quickly slides inside the flesh, and with that, it all becomes clear. Boy Kavalier is trying to create a monster. This won't end well."

Eric Francisco of Esquire wrote, "The Alien movies have long shown that people can and will fall apart when death comes knocking at their door. There are monsters and there are monstrosities. Alien: Earth is slowly but surely weaving a story where it's never easy to tell them apart." Mary Kassel of Screen Rant wrote, "Thus far, I'm less plagued by these questions than excited to discover how Alien: Earth will answer them. My concerns about the series' trajectory aren't overwhelming, and as we get attached to the characters and their arcs, I'm ready and willing to see how the show will further connect the many plot threads it's woven, all packed with potential."

Sean T. Collins of The New York Times wrote, "That's a whole lot of characterization to accomplish in an aftermath episode, but Alien: Earth understands that for its monsters to matter, making the people matter too is mission-critical work." Paul Dailly of TV Fanatic gave the episode a 4.5 star out of 5 rating and wrote, "Instead of easing off the gas, the episode peeled back new layers of Prodigy's agenda, revealing just how much potential this series has to stand alongside its cinematic predecessors."

=== Accolades ===
TVLine named Babou Ceesay the "Performer of the Week" for the week of August 23, 2025, for his performance in the episode. The site wrote, "In Alien: Earth's early episodes, Ceesay's cyborg Morrow came off as nearly as big a villain as the xenomorphs, ruthlessly sacrificing human lives to preserve the alien specimens at all costs. He was a fearsome figure again this week, too, but Ceesay also let us see the human side of the cyborg peeking around the edges, giving us fresh insight into what's really driving this fascinating character."
