= The Real Monsters =

- Alien: Earth episode
- Episode no.: Season 1 Episode 8
- Directed by: Dana Gonzales
- Written by: Noah Hawley; Migizi Pensoneau
- Cinematography by: David Franco; Bella Gonzales
- Editing by: Regis Kimble
- Original air date: September 23, 2025
- Running time: 47 minutes

Guest appearance
- Sandra Yi Sencindiver as Yutani

Episode chronology
← Previous "Emergence"	Next → —

"The Real Monsters" is the eighth episode and first season finale of the American science fiction horror television series Alien: Earth, part of the Alien franchise. The episode was written by series creator Noah Hawley and co-executive producer Migizi Pensoneau, and directed by executive producer Dana Gonzales. It aired on FX on September 23, 2025, and was released on FX on Hulu on the same day.

The series is set in 2120, two years before the events of the original 1979 film Alien. It focuses on the space vessel Maginot crash-landing on Earth, where a young woman and a ragtag group of tactical soldiers make a discovery that puts them face-to-face with the planet's biggest threat. In the episode, Wendy and the Lost Boys plan to take control of the facility and the world at large, while the Xenomorph's presence forces an evacuation.

According to Nielsen Media Research, the episode was seen by an estimated 0.469 million household viewers and gained a 0.07 ratings share among adults aged 18–49. The episode received mixed reviews from critics, who were polarized over the character development and writing.

== Plot ==
With the Xenomorph loose in the facility, non-essential personnel are evacuated. The hybrids are kept imprisoned in a cell, while Joe and Morrow are separately imprisoned. Wendy convinces the Lost Boys that they should be the ones to be afraid of, and uses her synthetic body's neural connection to the Prodigy network to shut down the facility's power.

Wendy opens Joe's and Morrow's cell. Joe searches for Wendy, while Morrow finds and attacks Kirsh in the lab. Despite being badly damaged in the fight, Kirsh manages to choke Morrow unconscious. Kavalier visits the hybrids with a security guard, telling them they are his property and the key to human immortality. He states his belief that he will one day rule the world, and tells them when he was six, he created his first synthetic human to help free him from his abusive father, leading to the synth becoming a replacement father figure. However, Wendy opens the cell and Nibs mauls the security guard to death, prompting Kavalier to flee and hide. The Lost Boys separate to evacuate the facility, with Wendy searching for Joe and Nibs capturing Dame Sylvia. Slightly and Smee reach the lab, tying up Kirsh and knocking Morrow unconscious again. At the same time, Joe's fellow soldiers arrive in the lab but are attacked by the D. Plumbicare plant pod, which consumes Siberian.

Atom Eins lures Joe to a room containing the Ocellus, and locks him in with the creature. The Ocellus leaves the sheep's body and tries to attach itself to Joe. However, Wendy arrives and fights off the Ocellus. Atom subdues them both, revealing himself as Kavalier's first synth, but Wendy manages to immobilize his systems. After arguing with Joe over what their real purpose is, they confront Kavalier, who is trying to escape the facility. When security arrives, Wendy calls the Xenomorph, which kills them, before Wendy spares and incapacitates Kavalier. Yutani's forces are seen arriving at the island, while the Ocellus escapes to the beach, where it possesses Arthur's corpse.

With security dead, Wendy, Joe, and the Lost Boys imprison Kavalier, Kirsh, Dame, Atom, and Morrow in a cell. Wendy mocks Kavalier's fascination with Peter Pan, deeming him an "angry little man". With the two Xenomorphs under her control, Wendy declares "Now we rule."

== Production ==
=== Development ===
In August 2025, FX announced that the eighth episode of the season would be titled "The Real Monsters", and that it would be written by series creator Noah Hawley and co-executive producer Migizi Pensoneau, and directed by executive producer Dana Gonzales. This marked Hawley's eighth writing credit, Pensoneau's first writing credit, and Gonzales' fourth directing credit.

=== Writing ===
Hawley said that the episode wanted to explore whether Wendy would prefer to be "human" or "other", while reaffirming that the hybrids' limitations would prove to be an obstacle, "it's worrisome, because she has all this power, but she doesn't yet have the perspective [Joe] thinks she needs." He also added that he wanted to see how a Xenomorph adapts to a new environment, "on some level, Jurassic Park is one of the grandfather texts of all stories that grapple with people making terrible decisions in the name of money/science. But the other thing that was really interesting to me with the xenomorphs is we've never seen them in a natural ecosystem before, certainly not our own. There's power to that. That shot of the xenomorph and the cave, it's really striking. To see it moving through foliage and on the beach, etcetera, it makes it less abstract."

Wendy's actions were also intended to show how her trauma has impacted her, with Hawley saying "I think she's angry, and I think she feels hurt and she's grieving Isaac. She still hasn't necessarily dealt with the trauma of being a terminally ill kid, like all that stuff is in there but she's acting with what feels like moral clarity to her." Sydney Chandler offered her interpretation, "I think post-seeing her grave, and seeing her brother mourn the skeleton in the earth further separated her from Marcy. I think as a protective measure as well, she's fallen deeper into the mechanics of her body, with its weight and its stillness and its lethal abilities. So I think if she started off hot, she's gone quite cold." She also explained her reaction to Kavalier's laugh, "I think that was kind of the resonance both he and I were going for. They see each other, they've clocked each other, and she's figured out his game. She started her own game now."

Hawley said that Kavalier's reaction at the end had multiple meanings, "If you're Peter Pan and you want death to adults, how great is it that the children are going to rule now? Who knows what will happen? So I do think he certainly has a low point when Wendy holds up the mirror and shows him who he really is. But then there's delight in the fact that she's picking up the matchbook and is ready to burn it all down. It's so exciting what's going to happen next." Samuel Blenkin said that his reaction displayed arrogance, stating "They've gone far beyond what he thought they were capable of. That laugh is just filled with admiration for them." He adds, "He doesn't know what's gonna happen next, and there's part of him that might have been waiting for this moment for a long time — a moment when the control gets taken away from him."

Regarding Morrow's status at the end, Babou Ceesay says, "So Morrow is looking around the room for information and opportunity. He's a predator in that respect. If there ends up being a squabble with the adults, it might be useful for him. So the question that hangs in the air — what's going to happen now? Who knows? Hopefully we get a second season and that moment gets taken somewhere." Timothy Olyphant expressed satisfaction for the ending, saying "The pitfall of television is that, and you can feel it as a viewer, as great as some shows are, you can tell that they don't know the ending, and the ending is what makes us give stories meaning. But Noah writes television with an ending in mind, and you can feel that when you read his work, when you show up on set."

== Reception ==
=== Viewers ===
In its original American broadcast, "The Real Monsters" was seen by an estimated 0.469 million household viewers with a 0.07 in the 18–49 demographics. This means that 0.07 percent of all households with televisions watched the episode. This was a 21% increase in viewership from the previous episode, which was seen by an estimated 0.385 million household viewers with a 0.08 in the 18–49 demographics.

=== Critical reviews ===
"The Real Monsters" received mixed reviews from critics. Clint Gage of IGN gave the episode a "great" 8 out of 10 and wrote in his verdict, "Wrapping up an ambitious season of television is no easy feat under the best of circumstances. Alien: Earth crafted an eerie new vibe for the iconic franchise, and the finale follows suit. Equal parts adoring of the source material and excitedly forging new paths, “The Real Monsters” straddles the line between wrapping the story up and dangling the audience off a cliff, but can't quite make up its mind. The way in which the finale holds everybody accountable for their actions throughout the season, however, makes it great. And, man, poor Arthur; oh, and you just know his marriage wasn't going to survive this ordeal even if he did."

Matt Schimkowitz of The A.V. Club gave the episode a "C+" grade and wrote, "Scary is the least an Alien should be. To that end, Alien: Earth's terrestrial thrills were always fleeting and in short supply. We didn't even get to enjoy Boy Kavalier getting his comeuppance. To that, I ask the perennial question of our time: What are we even doing here?"

Noel Murray of Vulture gave the episode a 3 star out of 5 rating and wrote, "Nearly everything that worked well in the first half of season one has remained strong in the second half: the darkly comic machinations of the monsters, the thoughtful examination of what defines a “human,” and the gung-ho performances by actors who are playing some pretty far-out characters. But while the first four episodes were well-plotted and sure-footed — building up to episode five's ambitious Alien remix — the final three have been relatively attenuated. It's as though Noah Hawley ran out of story before he ran out of episodes." Shawn Van Horn of Collider gave the episode a 9 out of 10 rating, particularly praising its cliffhanger and ending with Wendy and Joe together.

Eric Francisco of Esquire wrote, "If you're here, that means you've been left behind by the rapture. Bummer. But the good news is that your sinful and unworthy self gets to see Alien: Earth end on a high note." Mary Kassel of Screen Rant wrote, "If there's one hope I have for Alien: Earth season 2, it's that the wait won't be too long between seasons. Of course, this is probably foolish, as the gaps between seasons are growing larger every year, but the semi-cliffhanger ending of Alien: Earth has me on the edge of my seat, ready for more. The fact that I know my favorite characters, from nearly all the Lost Boys to Boy Kavalier himself, will be back for Alien: Earth season 2 means the wait will be agony, but it will likely be worth it."

Sean T. Collins of The New York Times wrote, "there's nothing to endure about Alien: Earth, a thrilling, stylish sci-fi horror show in its own right and a top-tier entry in the franchise. As the show's creator, Noah Hawley has done what countless unfortunate employees of the Weyland-Yutani Corporation have been unable to do for nearly 50 years: He brought Aliens to Earth successfully." Paul Dailly of TV Fanatic gave the episode a 4.25 out of 5 star rating and wrote, "Alien: Earth Season 1 has been a fascinating experiment in expanding the franchise beyond its usual horror trappings, and this finale crystallized what makes it work."
