= 2025 American Society of Cinematographers Awards =

2026 ceremony awarding excellence in cinematography

40th ASC Awards
- Date: March 8, 2026
- Site: The Beverly Hilton, Beverly Hills
- Hosted by: Kerri Kenney-Silver

The 40th American Society of Cinematographers Awards was held on March 8, 2026 at The Beverly Hilton in Beverly Hills, California, to honor the best cinematographers of film, television, and music videos in 2025. The ceremony was livestreamed through the society's official website. Actress Kerri Kenney-Silver hosted the award for the first time.

== Winners and nominees ==
The nominations were announced on January 8, 2026, with the honorary awards announced on December 3, 2025. Winners are listed first and in bold.

=== Film ===
Theatrical Feature Film	Spotlight Award
**Michael Bauman – One Battle After Another**; Autumn Durald Arkapaw, ASC – Sinners; Darius Khondji, ASC, AFC – Marty Supreme; Dan Laustsen, ASC, DFF – Frankenstein; Adolpho Veloso, ABC, AIP – Train Dreams	**Mátyás Erdély, ASC, HSC – Orphan**; Steven Breckon – The Plague; Karl Walter Lindenlaub, ASC, BVK – Amrum

=== Television ===
Episode of a One-Hour Regular Series	Episode of a Half-Hour Series
**Christophe Nuyens, SBC – Andor for "I Have Friends Everywhere" (Disney+)**; **Alex Disenhof, ASC – Task for "Crossings" (HBO)**; Jessica Lee Gagné – Severance for "Hello, Ms. Cobel" (Apple TV); Dana Gonzales, ASC – Alien: Earth for "Neverland" (FX); Ben Kutchins, ASC – The White Lotus for "Killer Instincts" (HBO)	**Adam Newport-Berra – The Studio for "The Oner" (Apple TV)**; Adam Bricker, ASC – Hacks for "I Love LA" (HBO Max); Fraser Brown, CSC – Twisted Metal for "NUY3ARZ" (Peacock); Paul Daley – The Righteous Gemstones for "Prelude" (HBO); Daniel Grant – Murderbot for "Escape Velocity Protocol" (Apple TV); Matthew J. Lloyd, ASC – Government Cheese for "Trial and Error" (Apple TV)
Limited or Anthology Series or Motion Picture Made for Television
**Pete Konczal, ASC – Black Rabbit for "Isle of Joy" (Netflix)**; Michael Bauman – Monster: The Ed Gein Story for "Buxum Bird" (Netflix); Sam Chiplin – The Narrow Road to the Deep North for "Episode 1" (Prime Video); Matthew Lewis – Adolescence for "Episode 2" (Netflix); Igor Martinović – Black Rabbit for "Attaf**kinboy" (Netflix)

=== Other media ===
Documentary Award	Music Video Award
**Mstyslav Chernov and Alex Babenko – 2000 Meters to Andriivka**; Brandon Somerhalder – Come See Me in the Good Light; Lars Erlend Tubaas Øymo and Tor Edvin Eliassen – Folktales	**Rodrigo Prieto, ASC, AMC – "The Fate of Ophelia" (performed by Taylor Swift)**; Jeff Cronenweth, ASC – "Supernatural" (performed by Ariana Grande); Jon Joffin, ASC and Mitchell Baxter – "False Prophet" (performed by Pillars of a Twisted City); Jon Joffin, ASC – "Visiting Hours" (performed by Jon Bryant); Juliette Lossky – "Altamaha-ha" (performed by Stacy Subero)

=== Honorary awards ===
- Lifetime Achievement Award: Robert Yeoman
- Career Achievement in Television Award: M. David Mullen
- President Award: Cynthia Pusheck
- Award of Distinction: Stephen Pizzello
- Board of Governors Award: Guillermo del Toro
- Curtis Clark Technology Award: Kodak
