= The Fly (Alien: Earth) =

- Alien: Earth episode
- Episode no.: Season 1 Episode 6
- Directed by: Ugla Hauksdóttir
- Written by: Noah Hawley; Lisa Long
- Cinematography by: David Franco
- Editing by: Curtis Thurber
- Original air date: September 9, 2025
- Running time: 57 minutes

Guest appearances
- Sandra Yi Sencindiver as Yutani; Kit Young as Tootles / Isaac; Andre Flynn as Barrister McAfee

Episode chronology
← Previous "In Space, No One..."	Next → "Emergence"

"The Fly" is the sixth episode of the American science fiction horror television series Alien: Earth, part of the Alien franchise. The episode was written by series creator Noah Hawley and supervising producer Lisa Long, and directed by Ugla Hauksdóttir. It aired on FX on September 9, 2025, and was released on FX on Hulu on the same day.

The series is set in 2120, two years before the events of the original 1979 film Alien. It focuses on the space vessel Maginot crash-landing on Earth, where a young woman and a ragtag group of tactical soldiers make a discovery that puts them face-to-face with the planet's biggest threat. In the episode, Kavalier meets with Yutani to discuss the ship cargo, while Wendy begins to doubt the purpose of the hybrids in the facility.

According to Nielsen Media Research, the episode was seen by an estimated 0.478 million household viewers and gained a 0.12 ratings share among adults aged 18–49. The episode received mostly positive reviews from critics, who praised its writing, suspense and climax.

== Plot ==
As the Xenomorph keeps growing, Wendy continues attempting to communicate with it. Nibs undergoes a scientific test, but Atom Eins refuses to wait for more time; he instead asks Dame and Arthur to restore her state before the visit to the Tower. Dame reluctantly agrees, but Arthur refuses, prompting Atom to fire him and demand that he leave the facility that day, or face being executed.

Accompanied by Kirsh, Kavalier attends a meeting with Yutani, who is accompanied by Morrow. Yutani wants the cargo back as the ship was Weyland-Yutani's, but Kavalier claims the costs of damages and civilian deaths make it his property to investigate. They finally reach an agreement wherein Yutani will give him billions for the damages, but Kavalier states he will not return the cargo for another six weeks, the protocol for off-world quarantine. Morrow still tells Yutani that he will retrieve the specimens as soon as possible.

While Kirsh is away, Isaac is asked to take care of the specimens. As he serves them food, the Ocellus surprises him into accidentally locking himself in the same cage as two fly-like creatures, who spray acid on his face, killing him, before feeding on his body. Wendy is confused by Nibs' new behavior and confronts Dame, who confirms they reprogrammed her. Upset, she declares that they are only using them as tools. Morrow once again tries to get Slightly to help him get a human near the egg; he asks Joe to help with something, but Joe is forced to decline as he is deployed to a new assignment.

As Arthur packs his things, he is visited by Joe. As a last act of kindness, he covertly deactivates Wendy's tracking device and gives Joe the code for a boat, which could allow Wendy and Joe to escape. Noticing Isaac is disconnected, he goes to the space lab accompanied by Slightly. Arthur tries to move Isaac's body, but Slightly opens the cage of the Xenomorph eggs and locks him in, allowing a facehugger to latch onto Arthur's head. Kirsh watches this through security cameras, but does not tell Kavalier. Slightly hides along with Arthur's body in an air vent as the flies leave their chamber.

== Production ==
=== Development ===
In August 2025, FX announced that the sixth episode of the season would be titled "The Fly", and that it would be written by series creator Noah Hawley and supervising producer Lisa Long, and directed by Ugla Hauksdóttir. This marked Hawley's sixth writing credit, Long's first writing credit and Hauksdóttir's second directing credit.

=== Writing ===
Kit Young said that Isaac's death was essential in proving Prodigy's lies regarding how hybrids cannot die, "It's utter panic, because everything that Prodigy is building the hybrids on is a lie. All of these corporations are trying to achieve immortality through very different methods, and with Prodigy, it's with these bodies. The stakes go way up for all the other Lost Boys, especially with Wendy, knowing that really no one is safe."

For the meeting between Kavalier and Yutani, Samuel Blenkin said that his character exhibits a behavior where he likes to be a "disruptor" to both parties, adding "I think that's exactly the reason why he’s doing it. It's disrespect. That was also an extra level of fun doing that, because it is just so rude to do it in that situation. I just think that a character like that, you want to push it to the extremes, but always keep it just below caricature and in believability."

On Arthur's death, David Rysdahl explained, "That's the horror that comes back to get me. I've failed them as a father. And as Noah asked once, ‘Where are the adults right now?’ I think we all feel that way. We're having a hard time trusting experts or anyone who doesn't say the exact same things that we say. I don't know the answer. But as it is now, we're just going to act out of self-interest and emotion, and then the aliens are going to win." Essie Davis also addressed Dame's decision to continue helping Prodigy, "There's this point where Dame is not expecting Arthur to get fired, but she is quite aware they are expendable. They are employees. I think she's trying to make sure she gets to stay in control of this experiment."

=== Filming ===
For Isaac's death scene, practical effects were priority. The white liquid spreading was a homage to the beheading scene in Alien. According to director Ugla Hauksdóttir, the idea was always to get it filmed in a long take, "there was the whole physical component of that. But then there was also the more emotional component, which is him realizing that he's stuck inside a cage with a dangerous alien creature."

== Reception ==
=== Viewers ===
In its original American broadcast, "The Fly" was seen by an estimated 0.478 million household viewers with a 0.12 in the 18–49 demographics. This means that 0.10 percent of all households with televisions watched the episode. This was a 32% increase in viewership from the previous episode, which was seen by an estimated 0.361 million household viewers with a 0.10 in the 18–49 demographics.

=== Critical reviews ===
"The Fly" received mostly positive reviews from critics. Clint Gage of IGN gave the episode a "great" 8 out of 10 and wrote in his verdict, ""The Fly" brings us back to the futuristic present day on Prodigy's Neverland island and hammers what might be the final nail in the “are they still human in there” coffin. It's a question they've already dealt with at length, which is really the only knock on this episode. But if they're going to do something twice, at least they did it better the second time! Director Ugla Hauksdóttir and writers Noah Hawley and Lisa Long get a little more explicit in drawing connections between Wendy, the Lost Boys and the alien species being studied in the lab, while placing characters in pairs for the homestretch of what's been a great season. Borrowing a title from another sci-fi horror icon, "The Fly" is another chapter in Alien: Earth that shows just how well the behind-the-scenes team understands the sandbox they're playing in."

Matt Schimkowitz of The A.V. Club gave the episode a "B" grade and wrote, ""The Fly" wasn't through with these conversations, as the episode showcases a critical facet of the tech industry: arbitration. Given the numerous conversations between humans and machines over what the hybrids are and how they should be treated, the show gives us a counterexample: how humans discuss other humans."

Alan Sepinwall of Rolling Stone wrote, "Isaac's death is a master class in suspense, and another example of how the eyeball has somehow turned out to be the scariest creature on a show featuring one of the most iconic monsters in the history of filmed entertainment." Noel Murray of Vulture gave the episode a 4 star out of 5 rating and wrote, "In this week's episode, "The Fly", there are times where the conversations aren't just artlessly blunt but also sloppily wedged in, as though Hawley were rushing to clarify a few major themes before the season's big finish. And yet... those conversations are also entertainingly provocative, and they're accompanied by some of the scariest and most disgusting scenes the series has delivered up to now. If nothing else, this show is really good at getting gross."

Eric Francisco of Esquire wrote, ""The Fly" is a busy episode, with incredible bits and pieces worth recognizing." Shawn Van Horn of Collider gave the episode a 9 out of 10 rating and wrote, "In the sixth episode of Alien: Earth, "The Fly", Wendy, the Lost Boys, and everyone else we've gotten to know return, but things aren't going so well. Before the end credits roll, two characters will be dead."

Sean T. Collins of The New York Times wrote, "After this fantastic episode, the best of the series since the premiere, these are questions worth asking. Neverland, the boy genius's island lair, is quickly falling into disorder despite its extensive security protocols. Saboteurs with motives noble and base are running amok. These monsters may or may not have been easy to box up the first time around, but something tells me this time's going to be trickier." Mary Kassel of Screen Rant wrote, "Alien: Earth might have taken episode 5 to give us context, but the series more than made up for this in "The Fly", moving the plot forward more than it has all season."

=== Accolades ===
TVLine named Samuel Blenkin as an honorable mention for the "Performer of the Week" for the week of September 13, 2025, for his performance in the episode. The site wrote, "We love to hate Alien: Earth's Samuel Blenkin as supremely obnoxious tech billionaire Boy Kavalier — the name is a hint about his maturity level — and Blenkin outdid himself this week as Boy Kavalier took delight in playing hardball with Weyland-Yutani over the alien specimens. Boy Kavalier glided into the arbitration meeting in bare feet and rudely put them up on the conference table, with Blenkin oozing metric tons of rock-star entitlement. But then Boy Kavalier rattled off a bunch of clever legal arguments, with Blenkin reminding us that there's a huge brain inside that swelled head of his. When Kavalier came out on top in the negotiations and walked out victorious, Blenkin flashed a mischievous grin, and we almost forgot how badly we've wanted to see him humbled. That's the ultimate feather in Blenkin's cap: We can't help but smile at his antics, even when we're rooting for a xenomorph to devour him."
