= Alone at Dawn =

- Directed by: Ron Howard
- Screenplay by: Michael Russell Gunn
- Based on: Alone at Dawn by: Dan Schilling; Lori Longfritz
- Produced by: Ron Howard; Brian Grazer; Kristy Grisham; William Connor; Patrick Newall
- Starring: Adam Driver; Anne Hathaway; Betty Gilpin; Jon Bass; Rohan Campbell; Devon Bostick
- Cinematography: Salvatore Totino
- Edited by: Cam McLauchlin
- Production companies: Metro-Goldwyn-Mayer; Thruline; Hideaway; Imagine Entertainment
- Distributed by: Amazon MGM Studios
- Release date: December 25, 2027
- Country: United States
- Language: English

Alone at Dawn is an upcoming American war drama film directed by Ron Howard, and starring Adam Driver, Anne Hathaway, and Betty Gilpin. Adapted from the 2019 book of the same name by Dan Schilling and Lori Chapman Longfritz, it recounts the true life story of United States Air Force Combat Controller John A. Chapman leading up to his actions and death at the Battle of Takur Ghar. It was shot in Budapest.

Alone at Dawn is scheduled to be released by Amazon MGM Studios on December 25, 2027, before going wide on January 7, 2028.

== Cast ==
- Adam Driver as John A. Chapman
- Anne Hathaway
- Betty Gilpin
- Jon Bass
- Rohan Campbell
- Devon Bostick
- Jonathan Ajayi
- Austin Amelio
- Sam Nelson Harris
- Henry Garrett
- Ben Weinswig
- Michael Angelo Covino
- Lauren Hutton
- Sean Kaufman
- Ntare Guma Mbaho Mwine
- José Zúñiga

== Production ==
In March 2021, Metro-Goldwyn-Mayer acquired the film rights to the package, then known as Combat Control with Sam Hargrave being attached direct the film and Jake Gyllenhaal starring and serving as an executive producer on the film.

It was announced in October 2025 that Adam Driver and Anne Hathaway were set to star in the film, with Ron Howard directing and Gyllenhaal and Hargrave no longer involved anymore. In November, Betty Gilpin and several cast members were added to the cast.

Principal photography began on November 10, 2025, and wrapped on February 11, 2026. It was shot between Maryland and Budapest.

== Release ==
Alone at Dawn is scheduled to be released in the United States on December 25, 2027, before going wide on January 7, 2028.
