= David Bark-Jones =

English actor

- Occupation: Actor
- Years active: 1995–present

David Bark-Jones is an English actor. He has appeared in numerous film, theatre and TV productions. In 2010 he won Broadwayworld.com's Best Actor in a West End Play, for his portrayal of Richard Hannay in The 39 Steps. In 2024, he appeared in the BBC soap opera Doctors as Ed Jordan.

== Early life ==
David is the son of a surgeon and a JP. He attended Rugby School and Newcastle University where he read Politics and Ancient History. He also attended Mountview Academy of Theatre Arts where he was taught the Stanislavski System of acting by Sam Kogan. After graduating and whilst working professionally, he continued to study directing under Kogan at The School of the Science of Acting (now known as The Kogan Academy of Dramatic Arts) as Kogan developed 'The Science of Acting' acting technique.

== Career ==
His professional stage debut in 1992 was as Redpenny in The Doctor's Dilemma at the Royal Exchange in Manchester, a role believed to be based on Bark-Jones's Great-Great Uncle, Leonard Noon the co-discoverer of Allergen immunotherapy. He then appeared in various repertory and TV productions in small roles until playing Carl in Patrick Marber's first and improvised play, Dealer's Choice at the Royal National Theatre and in the West End of London, Lt. Denny in the BBC's Pride and Prejudice, Bulanov in Alan Ayckbourn's The Forest adaptation also at the National Theatre, Bertie in Guy Ritchie's RocknRolla, Dr. Losberne in Alan Bleasdale's TV adaptation of Oliver Twist opposite Keira Knightley, Francis in Scott Free's Pillars of the Earth, and Marty Braemer in The Weinstein Company RADiUS division, Erased, or as known worldwide, The Expatriate. In 2013 Bark-Jones toured the UK in The Old Vic production of Noises Off as Gary Lejeune. In 2024, he joined the cast of the BBC soap opera Doctors in the recurring role of Ed Jordan.

== Filmography ==
=== Film ===
Year	Title	Role	Notes
2006	The Adventures of George the Projectionist	Bob	
2006	The Da Vinci Code	Hawker Pilot	
2006	Sixty Six	Alice's Young Man	
2008	RocknRolla	Bertie	
2009	The Calling	Vince	
2012	Erased	Marty Braymer	
2016	Breakdown	Benedict Morgan-Wells	
2017	Borg vs McEnroe	Hotel Doctor	Uncredited
2017	Starvecrow	David	
2018	Macbeth	Duncan	
2019	Amundsen	Robert Falcon Scott	
2020	The Courier	Golf Exec	
2023	Sparrow's Call	Mike	

=== Television ===
Year	Title	Role	Notes
1995	Pride and Prejudice	Lt. Denny	4 episodes
1996	The Legacy of Reginald Perrin	Adam Patterson	2 episodes
1997–1999	Wing and a Prayer	Simon Hudson	14 episodes
1998	Bramwell	Major Guy Quarrie	2 episodes
1999	Oliver Twist	Dr. Losberne	2 episodes
2000	Rough Treatment	Martin Fellowes	TV film
2002	Life for Daniel	David	TV film
2006	Rosemary and Thyme	Jarvis Edwards	Episode: "Three Legs Good"
2006	No Angels	Dr. David Morgan	Episode #3.6
2006	Berry's Way	Huw	TV film
2006	Victoria Cross Heroes	William Peel	Docudrama; episode: "The Empire"
2008	New Tricks	Richard Manning	Episode: "Spare Parts"
2008, 2010, 2012, 2014, 2018, 2024	Doctors	Jacob Hanson / Dr. Matt Jukes / Dr. David Wheeler / Richard Horton / Dexter Hardy / Ed Jordan	Various roles
2010	Identity	MacKenzie	Episode: "Reparation"
2010	The Pillars of the Earth	Francis	8 episodes
2011	Young James Herriot	Lord Douglas Muirhead	Episode #1.3
2012	Silk	Gareth Wells QC	Episode: "In the Family Way"
2013	Midsomer Murders	Patrick Tilman	Episode: "Death and the Divas"
2013	Jo	Mr. Van Vliet	Episode: "Notre Dame"
2014	24: Live Another Day	British Colonel	Episode: "Day 9: 4:00 p.m.-5:00 p.m."
2015	Jekyll and Hyde	Dr. Henry Jekyll	2 episodes
2017	Strike Back	Sergeant Philip Harmison	Episode: "Retribution: Part 1"
2017, 2019	Cold Feet	University Lecturer / Ian Deacon	3 episodes
2018	WW1: The Final Hours	Wemyss	TV film
2020	White House Farm	Antique Dealer	Episode #1.4
2022	Casualty	Joseph Crawson	Episode: "I Will Trust in You"
2022	Miss Scarlet and The Duke	Samuel Bedborough	Episode: "Quarter to Midnight"
2022	Industry	Douglas	Episode: "Lone Wolf and Cub"
2022	The Confessions of Frannie Langton	Judge Butterfield	Episode #1.4
2023	Secret Invasion	Robert Fairbanks	Episode: "Betrayed"
2023–2024	The Diplomat	Kemper-Waithe	4 episodes
2024	FBI: International	Armand Lambert	Episode: "Magpie"
2024	Sweetpea	Tommy	Episode: "Sorry for Your Loss"
2024	Dune: Prophecy	Vergyl Harkonnen	Episode: "Sisterhood Above All"
2025	Alien: Earth	Wealthy Tower Resident	Episode: "Mr. October"

=== Video games ===
Year	Title	Role	Notes
2023	F1 23	Davidoff Butler	Voice and motion capture
2025	F1 25	Davidoff Butler	Voice and motion capture
