= Jonathan Ajayi =

English actor

- Education: London Academy of Music and Dramatic Arts
- Occupation: Actor
- Years active: 2014 –present

Jonathan Ajayi is an English stage, television and film actor from London. He was recognized as a 2021 Screen International Star of Tomorrow. He trained at ArtsEd and LAMDA (London Academy of Music and Dramatic Art).

== Early life ==
From West London, London, Ajayi is of Nigerian heritage . He was mentored by Royal Shakespeare Company actor Joseph Marcell, whose wife worked at his sixth form. Ajayi attended ArtsEd and graduated in 2018 from the London Academy of Music and Dramatic Arts.

== Career ==
Leaving drama school early, Ajayi made his theatre debut at the Young Vic starring in The Brothers Size and played Lieutenant Lekan Baako in 2020 in the BBC One television series Noughts + Crosses. He appeared in the Patty Jenkins film Wonder Woman 1984 and was included on the 2020 longlist for Most Promising Newcomer at the British Independent Film Awards. He had a lead role in British romantic drama film The Drifters. He was named by Screen International as one of their 2021 Stars of Tomorrow.

In 2022, Ajayi was commended at the Ian Charleson Awards for his performance as Laertes in Hamlet at the Young Vic. He had a recurring role as Wes Harper in the second series of British thriller series Vigil. In 2024, he appeared in experimental production Talking People at the Bush Theatre in London.

Ajayi portrays Smee in the science-fiction series Alien: Earth.

== Filmography ==
Key
†	Denotes projects that have not yet been released

=== Film ===
Year	Title	Role	Notes	Ref.
2017	Hallelujah	Obi	Short film	
2018	Gone (After Lysistrata)	Marlon	Short film	
2020	Wonder Woman 1984	Emerson		
2021	The Drifters	Koffee		
2021	Play It Safe	Jonathan	Short film	
2024	5lbs of Pressure	Lucky		
2024	i and i	T	Short film	
2024	Chief of Station	Desmond Jackson		
2025	The Man in My Basement	Ricky		
2027	Alone at Dawn †	TBA	Post-production	

=== Television ===
Year	Title	Role	Notes	Ref.
2020–2022	Noughts + Crosses	Lieutenant Lekan Baako	Series regular; 7 episodes	
2023	Vigil	Wes Harper	Series regular; 6 episodes	
2025	Alien: Earth	Smee	Series regular; 8 episodes	

== Theatre credits ==
Year	Title	Role	Venue	Notes	Ref.
2015	A Midsummer Night's Dream In New Orleans	Lysander	Above the Arts, London		
2018	The Brothers Size	Oshoosi Size	Young Vic, London		
2019	Strange Fruit	Errol Marshal	Bush Theatre, London		
2019–2020	Three Sisters	Igwe	Royal National Theatre, London		
2021	Hamlet	Laertes	Young Vic, London		
2024	Talking People: Volume 2	Tolu	Bush Theatre, London		
