= Alien: Earth =

American sci-fi horror television series

- Genre: Horror; Science fiction
- Created by: Noah Hawley
- Based on: Alien by: Dan O'Bannon; Ronald Shusett
- Showrunner: Noah Hawley
- Starring: Sydney Chandler; Alex Lawther; Essie Davis; Samuel Blenkin; Babou Ceesay; Adarsh Gourav; Erana James; Lily Newmark; Jonathan Ajayi; David Rysdahl; Diêm Camille; Moe Bar-El; Adrian Edmondson; Timothy Olyphant
- Music by: Jeff Russo
- Opening theme: "Strange Brew" by Noah Hawley and Jeff Russo
- Ending theme: Various
- Country of origin: United States
- Original language: English
- No. of seasons: 1
- No. of episodes: 8

Production
- Executive producers: Noah Hawley; Ridley Scott; David W. Zucker; Dana Gonzales; Joseph E. Iberti; Clayton Krueger
- Producers: Darin McLeod; Chris Lowenstein; Apinat "Obb" Siricharoenjit
- Cinematography: Dana Gonzales; David Franco; Bella Gonzales; Colin Watkinson
- Editors: Regis Kimble; Robin August; Curtis Thurber
- Running time: 45–64 minutes
- Production companies: 26 Keys Productions; Scott Free Productions; FXP; Living Films

Original release
- Network: FX; FX on Hulu
- Release: August 12, 2025 – present

Alien: Earth is an American science fiction horror television series created by Noah Hawley. It is the first television series in the Alien franchise and is set two years before the events of the 1979 film Alien. The series stars Sydney Chandler, Alex Lawther, Essie Davis, Samuel Blenkin, Babou Ceesay, Adarsh Gourav, and Timothy Olyphant in main roles.

Development for the series was reported to have begun in early 2019, with Ridley Scott attached to executive produce for FX on Hulu. It had started pre-production by April 2023, with Chandler cast in the lead role the following month, and further casting taking place from July to November that year. After principal photography was delayed due to the COVID-19 pandemic, production began in July 2023 but was halted in August due to the 2023 SAG-AFTRA strike. Filming resumed in April 2024 and wrapped in July that year.

Alien: Earth premiered on FX and FX on Hulu in the United States and on Disney+ internationally on August 12, 2025. In November 2025, the series was renewed for a second season. Filming is anticipated to begin in mid- to late-2026 or early-2027.

== Premise ==
The opening of the first episode introduces the series' central premise as humanity's pursuit of immortality through three paths: cyborgs, humans enhanced with biomechatronic body parts; synthetics, fully artificial beings endowed with intelligence; and hybrids, synthetic bodies containing transferred human consciousness.

When the deep space research vessel USCSS Maginot crash-lands on Earth, a young hybrid woman named Wendy and a group of tactical soldiers make a discovery that puts them face-to-face with the planet's biggest threat.

== Cast and characters ==
=== Main ===
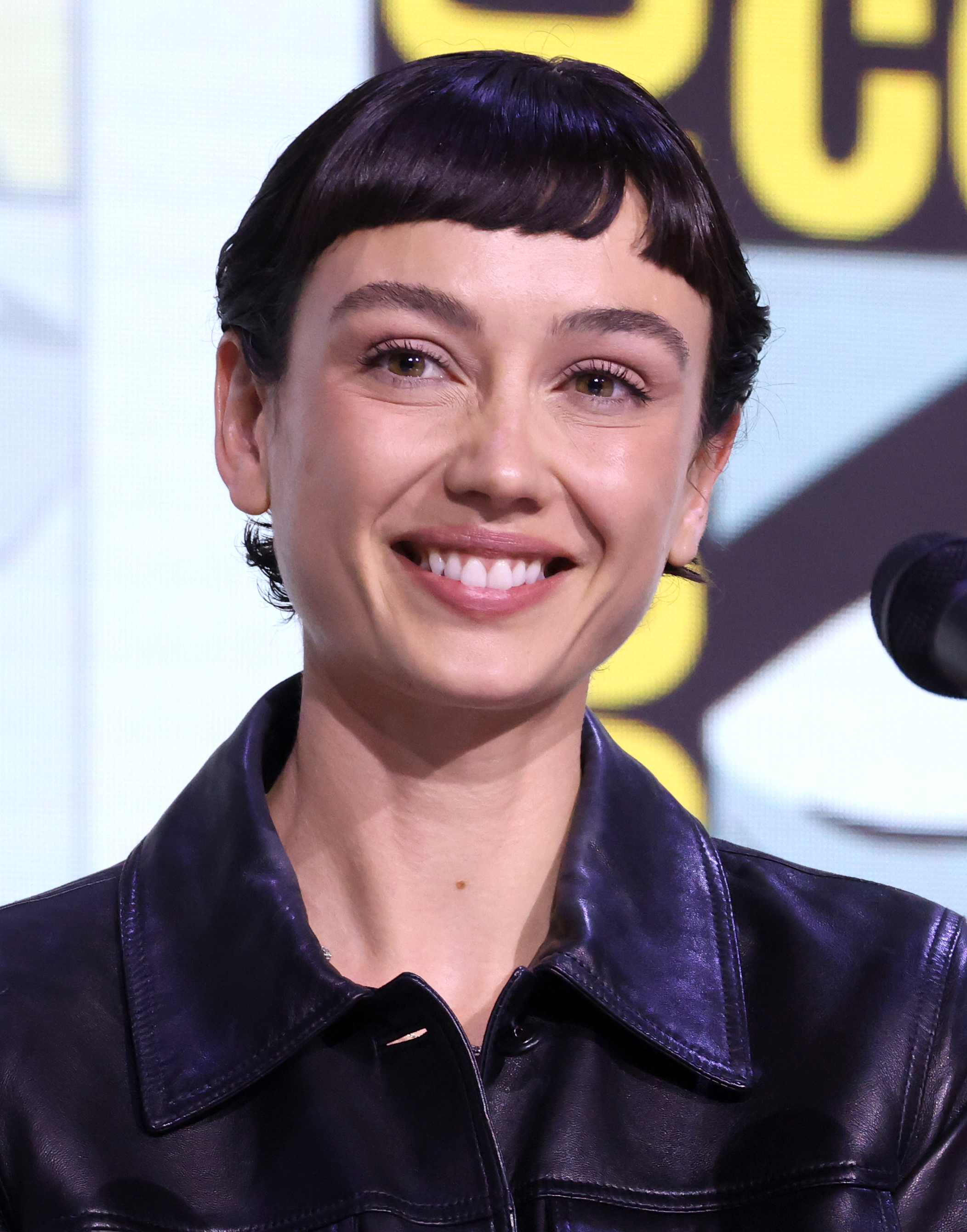
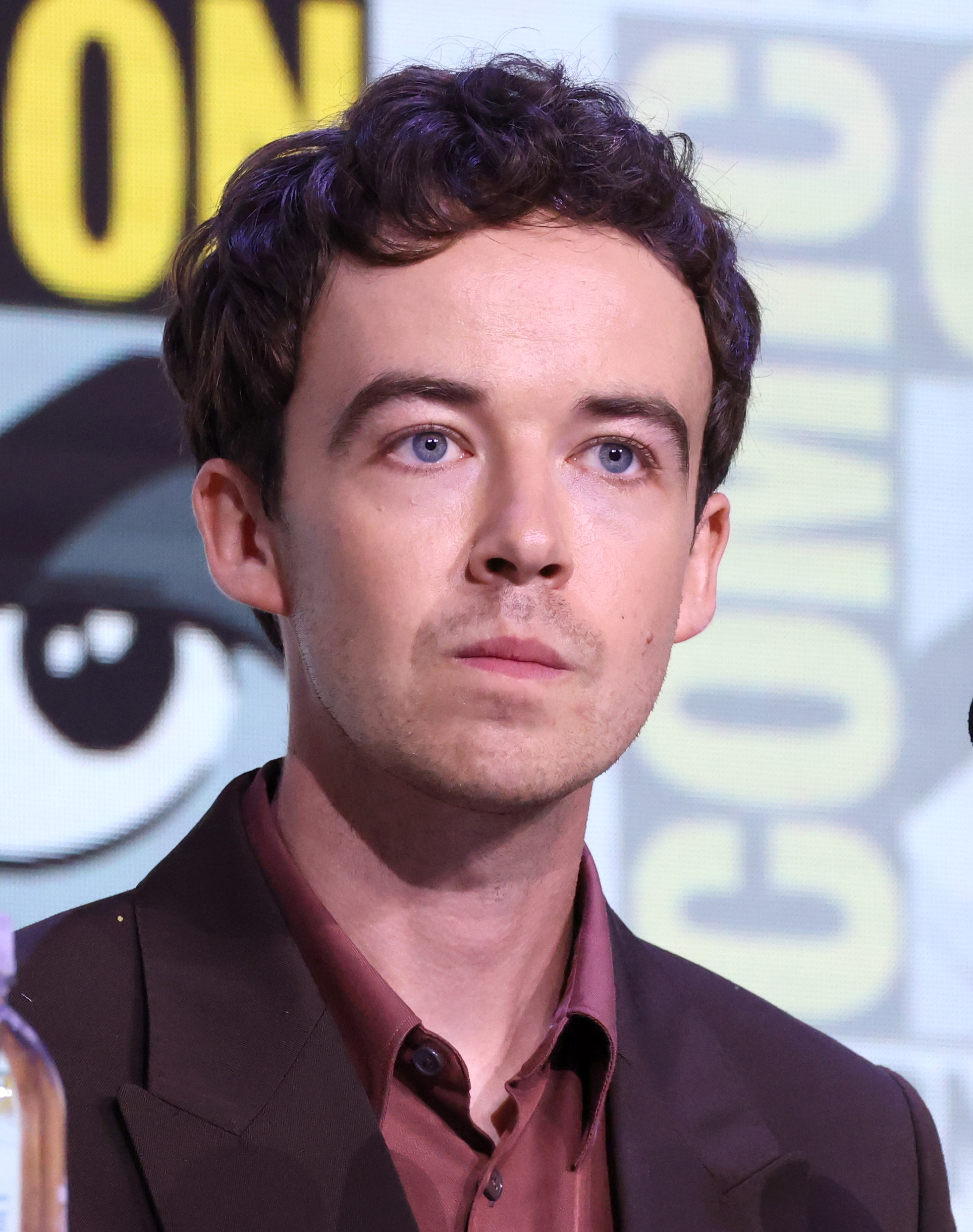
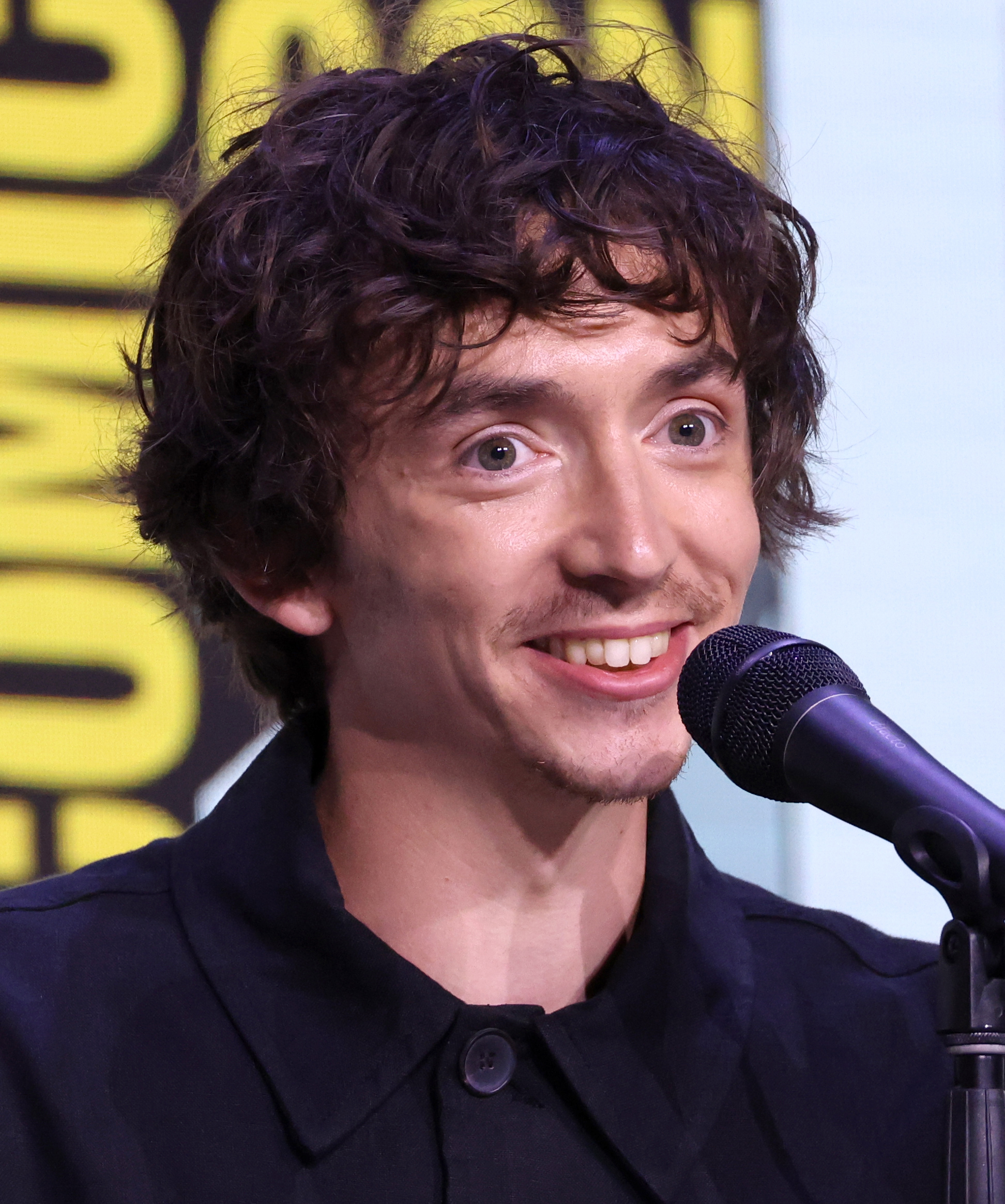
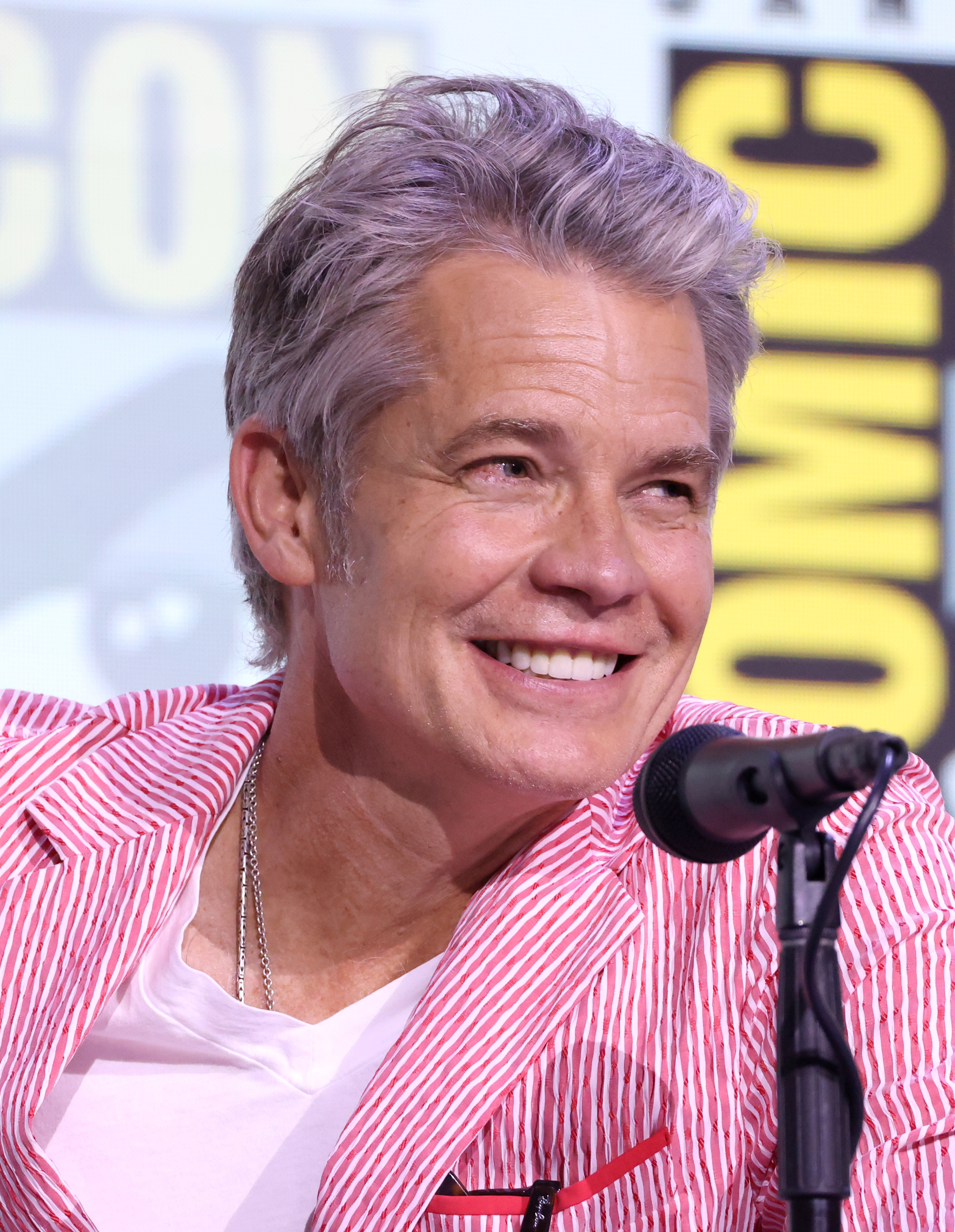
Left to right, top to bottom: Sydney Chandler, Alex Lawther, Samuel Blenkin, and Timothy Olyphant play Wendy, Joe Hermit, Boy Kavalier and Kirsh, respectively.
- Sydney Chandler as Wendy, the first hybrid and leader of the "Lost Boys", a group of six prototype hybrids created by the Prodigy Corporation from terminally ill children. Formerly known as Marcy Hermit, she was renamed Wendy after her transformation.
- Alex Lawther as Joe Hermit, a medic for the Prodigy Corporation Security Service, and Wendy's human brother.
- Essie Davis as Dame Sylvia, a scientist at Prodigy, therapist for the "Lost Boys", and Arthur Sylvia's wife.
- Samuel Blenkin as Boy Kavalier, the ambitious CEO of Prodigy and the world's youngest trillionaire.
- Babou Ceesay as Morrow, a cyborg employed as a security officer by the Weyland-Yutani Corporation and the only survivor from the Maginot.
- Adarsh Gourav as Slightly, a hybrid and member of the "Lost Boys". Formerly known as Aarush Singh.
- Erana James as Curly, a hybrid and member of the "Lost Boys". Formerly known as Jane Mita.
- Lily Newmark as Nibs, a hybrid and member of the "Lost Boys". Formerly known as Rose Ellis.
- Jonathan Ajayi as Smee, a hybrid and member of the "Lost Boys". Formerly known as Christopher Okafor.
- David Rysdahl as Arthur Sylvia, a scientist at Prodigy and Dame Sylvia's husband.
- Diêm Camille as Siberian, a Prodigy Corporation Security Service soldier partnered with Joe.
- Moe Bar-El as Rashidi, a Prodigy Corporation Security Service soldier partnered with Joe.
- Adrian Edmondson as Atom Eins, a synthetic and a trusted advisor to Boy Kavalier.
- Timothy Olyphant as Kirsh, a synthetic who serves as Prodigy's chief scientist and mentors the "Lost Boys".

=== Recurring ===
- Sandra Yi Sencindiver as Yutani, the CEO of the Weyland-Yutani Corporation.
- Kit Young as Tootles / Isaac, a hybrid and member of the "Lost Boys" who rejects the name "Tootles" given to him by Prodigy, instead renaming himself after Isaac Newton. Formerly known as Steven DiMarco.

=== Guest ===
- Richa Moorjani as Zoya Zaveri, the executive officer and later acting captain of the Maginot .
- Lloyd Everitt as Hoyt, a Prodigy Corporation Security Service soldier.
- Tayme Thapthimthong as Anant, a Prodigy Corporation Security Service soldier.
- Dean Alexandrou as Bergerfeld, a Prodigy Corporation Security Service soldier.
- Amir Boutrous as Rahim, a medical officer aboard the Maginot .
- Karen Aldridge as Chibuzo, a science officer aboard the Maginot .
- Michael Smiley as Shmuel, an engineer aboard the Maginot .
- Jamie Bisping as Malachite, an engineer's apprentice aboard the Maginot .
- Andy Yu as Teng, the navigator aboard the Maginot .
- Max Rinehart as Bronski, a science officer aboard the Maginot .
- Enzo Cilenti as Petrovich, the chief engineer aboard the Maginot .
- Tom Moya as Clem, a junior security officer aboard the Maginot .
- Victoria Masoma as Sullivan, a crew member aboard the Maginot .
- Tanapol Chuksrida as Dinsdale, the captain of the Maginot .
- Robin August as MU/TH/UR / "Mother", the A.I. running the Maginot's computer.
- David Bark-Jones as a wealthy tower resident of Prodigy City.

== Episodes ==
| No. | Title | Directed by | Written by | Original release date | U.S. viewers (millions) |
|---|---|---|---|---|---|
| 1 | "Neverland" | Noah Hawley | Noah Hawley | August 12, 2025 | 0.589 |
In 2120, five companies control Earth and the colonized Solar System, including the emerging Prodigy Corporation. After a 65-year mission to collect alien specimens, the Weyland-Yutani Corporation vessel USCSS Maginot malfunctions and crashes into Prodigy's city of New Siam, releasing a Xenomorph. At Prodigy's Neverland research island, a terminally ill girl named Marcy Hermit becomes the first human-synthetic hybrid, renamed Wendy after the character from Peter Pan. With the help of her synthetic mentor Kirsh, Wendy leads five other hybrids on rescue operations following the crash, while seeking to save her human brother Joe as Prodigy CEO Boy Kavalier exploits the disaster for corporate gain.
| 2 | "Mr. October" | Dana Gonzales | Noah Hawley | August 12, 2025 | 0.380 |
Kavalier reveals that he created the hybrid program to help humanity compete with artificial intelligence, and granted Wendy enhanced abilities to create a person smarter than himself. He refuses Weyland-Yutani's demand to reclaim the Maginot's cargo, warning that any intrusion on Prodigy territory will be treated as hostile. In New Siam, Joe is hunted by the Xenomorph until Weyland-Yutani security officer Morrow intervenes; the creature escapes after killing several soldiers. Meanwhile, the hybrids arrive in the city and encounter other alien specimens. Wendy finds Joe, who is stunned to learn that she is his resurrected sister, formerly Marcy. As they discover a cluster of Xenomorph eggs, Joe is seized by the creature, prompting Wendy to pursue it.
| 3 | "Metamorphosis" | Dana Gonzales | Noah Hawley and Bob DeLaurentis | August 19, 2025 | 0.441 |
Nibs questions Curly about why the hybrids are all named after Peter Pan characters and why Marcy was chosen as Wendy. Despite objections from Kirsh and head scientist Dame Sylvia, Kavalier orders the alien specimens transferred to Neverland island for study. In New Siam, Morrow discovers Smee and Slightly guarding Xenomorph eggs, downloads the Maginot's data, and erases the source before planting a device on Slightly and escaping. Wendy and Joe fight the Xenomorph with a meat hook and Wendy beheads it with a machete but both are severely injured and taken to the island for treatment. Morrow contacts Ms. Yutani and vows to retrieve the specimens. On Neverland, Curly challenges Kavalier's favoritism toward Wendy, while Morrow manipulates Slightly through the implanted device. Kirsh, Tootles, and Curly experiment on a facehugger, implanting its larva into Joe's damaged lung, removed during surgery. Wendy awakens, experiencing pain as she senses the Xenomorph eggs' signals, and collapses in the lab.
| 4 | "Observation" | Ugla Hauksdóttir | Noah Hawley and Bobak Esfarjani | August 26, 2025 | 0.393 |
After Wendy awakens, Dame's husband Arthur adjusts her hearing so she can perceive the Xenomorph eggs without pain, and Wendy discovers she can speak the Xenomorphs' language in a frequency audible to humans. Kirsh and Tootles experiment with Trypanohyncha ocellus, an octopus-like creature that implants itself in a sheep's brain through its eye socket. Tootles renames himself Isaac after Isaac Newton. Morrow manipulates Slightly, whose real name is revealed as Aarush Singh from India, into stealing a Xenomorph egg, using threats to his family as leverage. Nibs becomes violent after claiming to be pregnant and is unknowingly placed under house arrest. Disillusioned by his sister's treatment by Prodigy, Joe attempts to resign from the company, but Kavalier's assistant Atom Eins threatens to send him a large bill for his new lung and forever separate him from Wendy. When Slightly refuses to steal an egg, Morrow orders him to lure a human host to be implanted by a facehugger, unaware that Kirsh has been monitoring their conversations. Later, Wendy witnesses the Xenomorph emerging from Joe's former lung and soothes the creature through communication.
| 5 | "In Space, No One..." | Noah Hawley | Noah Hawley | September 2, 2025 | 0.361 |
A flashback shows the events on the Maginot before it reached Earth. A fire releases two facehuggers that attack Captain Dinsdale and Science Officer Bronski. Morrow, the ship's security officer, is awoken from cryo-sleep, learns the ship's navigation systems were damaged, and suspects sabotage. Dinsdale dies during attempted removal of the facehugger and Bronski is placed in cryo-sleep, in an ultimately futile attempt to prevent the gestation of the Xenomorph. Executive Officer Zaveri assumes command of the ship, but Morrow and MU/TH/UR, the ship's computer, threaten to relieve Zaveri if she does not prioritize the creatures above the crew. As other alien specimens escape, more crew members are killed. Morrow discovers chief engineer Petrovich sabotaged the ship in exchange for a promised hybrid body from Kavalier. Petrovich murders Clem before Morrow kills him and seals himself in the control room as the remaining crew are slaughtered. In the present, Morrow contacts Ms. Yutani, offering to retrieve the specimens by force and assassinate Kavalier.
| 6 | "The Fly" | Ugla Hauksdóttir | Noah Hawley and Lisa Long | September 9, 2025 | 0.478 |
As the Xenomorph grows, Wendy works on communicating with it. Nibs undergoes testing, prompting Atom Eins to demand Nibs memory be reset to before the Maginot's crash. Dame reluctantly accepts, but Arthur refuses, and is fired under threat of execution if Arthur is not gone by the end of the day. Wendy talks to Nibs and understands that Nibs was reprogrammed. Wendy confronts Dame about Nibs' condition. Meanwhile, Kavalier meets with Yutani over the ship's return and outwits Yutani, securing 20 billion USD in additional damages on top of the expected compensation while keeping the specimens for 6 weeks due to quarantine. Kirsh asks Isaac to feed and water the specimens while Kirsh is away. While feeding the specimens, the Ocellus surprises Isaac, and he is locked in a cage with two fly-like creatures. The flies destroy Isaac with acid and feed on his body. Slightly tries to lure Joe to the alien eggs, but Joe declines due to reassignment. Joe later visits a packing Arthur, who covertly deactivates Wendy's tracking device and gives Joe a boat code to help Joe and Wendy to escape. Noticing Isaac is disconnected, Arthur goes to the lab accompanied by Slightly. Slightly opens the cage of the Xenomorph eggs and locks Arthur inside the lab, allowing a facehugger to latch onto Arthur. Kirsh watches this through security cameras, but does not tell Kavalier. Slightly hides along with Arthur's body in an air vent as the flies leave their cage.
| 7 | "Emergence" | Dana Gonzales | Noah Hawley and Maria Melnik | September 16, 2025 | 0.385 |
Smee discovers Slightly hiding an incapacitated Arthur. Slightly convinces Smee to help deliver Arthur to Morrow on the beach. Security re-secures the lab specimens. Wendy is disgusted by Kavalier's attitude to Isaac's death, and convinces Nibs to join her and Joe in escaping the island. Curly does not want to leave the island and is consoled by Dame. Wendy hacks the lab system, releasing the grown Xenomorph, which kills several scientists and escapes into the forest. Kirsh finds Slightly and Smee carrying Arthur's body, but helps them to take a faster route to the beach. Outside, Arthur awakes after the facehugger dies. Shortly after, a newborn Xenomorph bursts from Arthur's chest, killing him, and escapes. Slightly and Smee take Arthur's corpse to the beach, where Morrow arrives. Having failed to bring the newborn Xenomorph, Morrow captures Slightly and Smee. After Kirsh shows Kavalier that it's the Ocellus which caused the lab accident involving Isaac's death, Kavalier becomes fascinated with the creature's intelligence, and wants to place it into a human host. Outside the lab, Wendy, Joe, and Nibs are held at gunpoint by Weyland-Yutani troops, but Wendy calls the Xenomorph which kills the soldiers. Morrow's team enter the facility, but they are taken captive by Kirsh, who has also captured the newborn Xenomorph. Wendy, Joe, and Nibs reach the boat, but they are intercepted by Neverland security. Frustrated, Nibs brutally kills a soldier, prompting Joe to shoot Nibs with a taser. A shocked Wendy scolds Joe, as the Xenomorph watches in the distance.
| 8 | "The Real Monsters" | Dana Gonzales | Noah Hawley & Migizi Pensoneau | September 23, 2025 | 0.469 |
Wendy, Nibs, Slightly, Smee and Curly are imprisoned in one cell while Joe and Morrow are imprisoned in another cell. Wendy uses her connection to the network to block the facility's cameras and communications. Wendy struggles with Joe's decision to shoot Nibs, believing Joe chose to ally himself with humans instead of her, but ultimately unlocks Joe's cell after Smee tells that Joe is one of them. Kavalier approaches the hybrids in the cell and reveals that at six years old, Kavalier built his own synthetic which he used to kill his abusive father. Wendy unlocks the cell, Nibs kills Kavalier's bodyguard, and Kavalier flees. Morrow attacks Kirsh in the lab. Kirsh is badly damaged but ultimately chokes Morrow unconscious. Smee and Slightly arrive in the lab and take both Kirsh and Morrow, while Nibs captures Dame. Atom lures Joe to Kavalier's room and unlocks the Ocellus. Wendy arrives to save Joe and fights Atom, who reveals himself as a synthetic, allowing Wendy to control Atom' motor functions through the network. After having devoured Prodigy soldier Siberian, the "plant" alien escapes from the lab. The Ocellus escapes to the beach, where it possesses Arthur's corpse. With the help of the older Xenomorph, Wendy and Joe capture Kavalier and lock him in a cell with Kirsh, Atom, Dame, and Morrow. As Yutani and her team approach the island for invasion, Wendy, with Nibs, Curly, Slightly, Smee, Joe, and both Xenomorphs nearby, declares, "Now, we rule."

== Production ==
=== Development ===
In February 2019, Bloody Disgusting reported that two Alien television series were in development, one animated – Alien: Isolation – and one live-action, from Ridley Scott for the network FX on Hulu. In December 2020, as part of Disney's Investor Day presentation, the latter television series project was officially announced to be in development for the network, with Noah Hawley as showrunner and Scott as executive producer, being set on Earth in the near future.

On February 17, 2022, The Hollywood Reporter revealed that the series is a prequel taking place before the events of Alien (1979). Asked about his approach to adding the show to a franchise like Alien with consideration to established canon, Hawley himself confirmed that the series would be "its own thing" tied more into the style and mythology of the original 1979 film and its sequel Aliens (1986), intentionally excluding some plot and style elements introduced in some of the other Alien media, like the prequel films Prometheus (2012), and Alien: Covenant (2017).

In April 2023, chairman of FX Productions, John Landgraf, stated that the series was in active pre-production. According to FX Entertainment president Gina Balian, the scale of the production of Alien: Earth was much bigger than that of the 2024 FX series Shōgun, whose budget has been reported as $250 million.

During the 2023 strikes, producer Chris Lowenstein, of Thailand-based production services company Living Films, continued work on the production in Bangkok. In an interview, Lowenstein said of the hiatus, "For me as a producer it was a blessing in disguise. We kept building in Bangkok. I didn't stop our set-dec, props, and construction teams, which are almost entirely Thai. That really gave us a head start for when we came back".

In September 2025, Hawley stated that work had not yet begun on a second season, but that conversations were ongoing. He mentioned that he was ready to begin immediately if The Walt Disney Company decided to renew the show and expected a renewal decision to be made "soon" after the airing of the season finale on September 23, 2025, once its viewership could be evaluated. On November 11, 2025, FX renewed the series for a second season.

=== Design ===
The design of the props, including the Xenomorph eggs, were created by Bangkok-based prosthetics and creature workshop Second Skin in collaboration with New Zealand's Wētā Workshop.

=== Casting ===
In May 2023, Sydney Chandler was cast in the lead role, followed by Alex Lawther, Samuel Blenkin, Essie Davis, and Adarsh Gourav in July. Timothy Olyphant and David Rysdahl would be among those added to the cast in November 2023.

In April 2026, Peter Dinklage joined the cast for the second season as a series regular. In July 2026, Tracey Ullman, Sam Spruell and Jerome Flynn were revealed to have joined the cast.

=== Filming ===
Location scouting began in 2021. Principal photography was scheduled to begin in March 2022, but was delayed due to the COVID-19 pandemic. Production on the series began on July 19, 2023, in Thailand and lasted for 123 days. The construction for the 82 sets were built in over 13 studios across Bangkok.

Locations in Bangkok included the Pratunam area, the Ashton Asoke-Rama 9 building in Thong Lo, and Soi Langsuan, by the Embassy of the United States, Bangkok and Lumphini Park. The island locations included Ko Samui and a hidden lagoon in Krabi. According to producer Chris Lowenstein, around 80% of filming was shot on stages while 20% was shot on location. Filming (without the American cast including Sydney Chandler, Timothy Olyphant, and David Rysdahl) was allowed to occur during the 2023 SAG-AFTRA strike due to the series' British cast working under an Equity contract. In late August, the production was halted due to the strike with most of the first episode completed. Filming resumed in April 2024, and wrapped in mid-July. Dana Gonzales, Bella Gonzales and Colin Watkinson serve as cinematographers. Filming for the second season was scheduled to begin in May 2026 at Pinewood Studios in London. It was completed by early November.

=== Music ===
The score for the series was composed by Jeff Russo, who composes the music for all of Noah Hawley's projects. The soundtrack was released on Hollywood Records on August 12, 2025. It will get a vinyl release in December 2025 on Mutant. Russo has said he views his lack of education as an orchestral composer as a strength, leading him to use some unconventional instruments in his score, such as the desmophon.

The episodes end on famous rock, metal and alternative rock songs because Hawley decided to highlight the cliffhanger endings by "mak[ing] an arena show, something that feels bigger than a small theater", featuring tracks by TV on the Radio, Black Sabbath, Tool, Metallica, Jane's Addiction, The Smashing Pumpkins, alt-j, Godsmack, Queens of the Stone Age and Pearl Jam. The soundtrack from the fifth episode "In Space, No One..." was released as a stand-alone album on September 2, 2025.

== Release ==
=== Promotion ===
Alien: Earth's promotion included immersive experiences such as The Wreckage, which was displayed at San Diego Comic-Con and South by Southwest, and The Hunt, an activation staged in major cities worldwide. FX also partnered with several companies for promotional tie-ins, offering limited-time meals and beverages through food and hotel chains, as well as exclusive merchandise.

=== Release ===
The first episode of Alien: Earth was screened early at the series' panel at San Diego Comic-Con on July 25. The series premiered on FX and FX on Hulu with its first two episodes on August 12, followed by weekly releases of the remaining six episodes. Internationally, Alien: Earth was made available to stream on Disney+.

The premiere episode of Alien: Earth on FX drew 589,000 total viewers (P2+), corresponding to a 0.19 rating. Subsequent episodes recorded total audiences ranging from 361,000 to 478,000 viewers throughout August and September 2025. The episode broadcast on September 23, 2025, attracted 469,000 viewers, earning a 0.15 rating, which represented a 22% increase compared with the previous week. Demographically, that episode registered 95,000 viewers among adults aged 18–49 (0.07 rating) and 176,000 viewers among adults aged 25–54 (0.14 rating).

== Reception ==
Sigourney Weaver, who portrayed Ellen Ripley in the original movies, praised the series, noting how it expands the franchise's scope and calling it "much more profound than just an Alien movie". Cameron, who directed Aliens, also praised it, highlighting its use of "a lot of the DNA" of the first three films. He stated that "It's great creative recombinance in action, but with its own swerve, which is basically what I did. You gotta celebrate the new with the old."

=== Viewership ===
The Walt Disney Company announced that the first episode of Alien: Earth garnered 9.2 million views worldwide within its first six days of streaming. This total was calculated by dividing the total hours watched by the episode's runtime, reflecting viewership on FX, Hulu, and Disney+. Analytics company Samba TV, which gathers viewership data from certain smart TVs and content providers, reported that Alien: Earth was watched by 1.8 million U.S. households during its live-plus-five-day period. Boomer households (ages 65–74) over-indexed in viewership by 8% compared to other demographic groups.

Nielsen Media Research, which records streaming viewership on some U.S. television screens, reported that Alien: Earth was watched for 464 million minutes between August 11–17, ranking as the seventh-most-streamed original series. In the following week, from August 18–24, it recorded 337 million minutes of watch time, making it the ninth-most-streamed original series that week. Alien: Earth was later streamed for 326 million minutes from August 25–31, making it the tenth-most-streamed original series of the week. Between September 1–7, it was streamed for 366 million minutes, ranking as the ninth most-streamed original series. In December 2025, Disney announced that Alien: Earth had surpassed 100 million hours of total viewing in 2025, becoming FX's largest streaming premiere to date.

=== Critical response ===
On the review aggregator website Rotten Tomatoes, 94% of 200 critics' reviews are positive, with an average rating of 8.25/10. The website's critics consensus reads: "Stylistically bold and scary as hell, Noah Hawley's Alien: Earth transplants the Xenomorph mythos into the television medium with its cinematic grandeur intact while staking out a unique identity of its own." Metacritic, which uses a weighted average, assigned a score of 85 out of 100, based on 41 critics, indicating "universal acclaim".

James Dyer of Empire gave the first season five out of five stars, praising its exploration of "the nature of consciousness, mortality, [and] humanity", concluding that "Hawley's series is a rare prequel that serves to enrich its source material, breathing new life into a once-tired franchise". For RogerEbert.com, Brian Tallerico wrote, "Tony Gilroy's work on Andor feels like a logical comparison, and that's the quality tier on which this show resides as well. ... [Hawley] delivers an 8-episode first season that somehow marries the philosophical depth that fans of Prometheus admired with the intense action and bone-chilling imagery of James Cameron's Aliens." Angie Han of The Hollywood Reporter described it as a "heady, sprawling, occasionally unwieldy but eventually thrilling epic about personhood, hubris, and of course, the primal pleasure of watching people get absolutely rocked by space monsters", noting its production design and "new beasts with their own deliciously horrible ways of killing".

Not all reviews were positive. Dominic Baez of The Seattle Times criticized the show's pace and uneven story, writing, "Its examination of identity ... is less insightful than it wants to be, buckling under the weight of its own unanswered questions. And far too often it feels like two separate plots stitched together, a Frankenstein's monster of existentialism and aliens ripping people apart." Nicholas Quah of Vulture called the feeling of the show "tedious" and wrote that it "struggles to resolve the tension between replicating the core Alien appeal and building a broader narrative suited for long-form television", at the same time questioning if Hawley is fit for the genre versus his previous neo-noir stylings.

=== Accolades ===
| Year | Award | Category | Recipient(s) | Result | Ref. |
|---|---|---|---|---|---|
| 2025 | Astra Creative Arts Awards | Best Sound | Alien: Earth | Won | |
| 2025 | Astra Creative Arts Awards | Best Visual Effects | Alien: Earth | Nominated | |
| 2025 | Environmental Media Awards | Drama Series | Alien: Earth (for "Neverland") | Nominated | |
| 2026 | American Society of Cinematographers | Episode of a One-Hour Regular Series | Dana Gonzales (for "Neverland") | Nominated | |
| 2026 | Art Directors Guild Awards | One-Hour Fantasy Single-Camera Series | Andy Nicholson (for "Neverland") | Nominated | |
| 2026 | Critics' Choice Awards | Best Drama Series | Alien: Earth | Nominated | |
| 2026 | Critics' Choice Super Awards | Best Science Fiction / Fantasy Series, Limited Series, or Made-for-TV Movie | Alien: Earth | Nominated | |
| 2026 | Critics' Choice Super Awards | Best Actor in a Science Fiction / Fantasy Series, Limited Series, or Made-for-TV Movie | Timothy Olyphant | Nominated | |
| 2026 | Critics' Choice Super Awards | Best Actress in a Science Fiction / Fantasy Series, Limited Series, or Made-for-TV Movie | Sydney Chandler | Nominated | |
| 2026 | Dorian TV Awards | Best Genre TV Show | Alien: Earth | Nominated | |
| 2026 | Dorian TV Awards | Most Visually Striking TV Show | Alien: Earth | Won (Note: Tied with Pluribus) | |
| 2026 | Fangoria Chainsaw Awards | Best Series | Alien: Earth | Nominated | |
| 2026 | Film Independent Spirit Awards | Best Lead Performance in a New Scripted Series | Sydney Chandler | Nominated | |
| 2026 | Film Independent Spirit Awards | Best Supporting Performance in a New Scripted Series | Babou Ceesay | Nominated | |
| 2026 | Golden Reel Awards | Outstanding Achievement in Sound Editing – Broadcast Long Form Effects / Foley | Various (Note: Nominees: Lee Gilmore, Brad North, Beso Kacharava, Nolan McNaughton, Justin Davey, Chris Terhune, Craig Henighan, Tim Walston, Matt "Smokey" Cloud, Albert Romero, Alexander Sanikidze, Rati Chkhetiani, Levan Tserediani, Biko Gogaladze, Stefan Fraticelli, Brandon Bak, and Jason Charbonneau) (for "Neverland") | Won | |
| 2026 | Golden Trailer Awards | Best Fantasy Adventure (Trailer/Teaser) – TV/Streaming Series | "Prodigy" (FX / ZEALOT) | Nominated | |
| 2026 | Golden Trailer Awards | Best Horror/Thriller TV Spot – TV/Streaming Series | ":60 Homage" (FX / FX Design) | Nominated | |
| 2026 | Golden Trailer Awards | Best Horror/Thriller TV Spot – TV/Streaming Series | "3:06 Gestation" (FX / FX Design / Tendril) | Won | |
| 2026 | Golden Trailer Awards | Best Thriller TrailerByte for a TV/Streaming Series | "Blood" (FX / ZEALOT) | Won | |
| 2026 | Golden Trailer Awards | Best Thriller TrailerByte for a TV/Streaming Series | Maginot Crash Video: "Brazil" (FX / FX Design) | Nominated | |
| 2026 | Golden Trailer Awards | Best Voice Over in a Trailer/Teaser – TV/Streaming Series | "Earth Day PSA" (FX / FX in House) | Nominated | |
| 2026 | Golden Trailer Awards | Home Ent: Best Digital – Horror/Thriller | ":60 Homage" (FX / FX Design) | Nominated | |
| 2026 | Golden Trailer Awards | Most Original (Trailer/Teaser) – TV/Streaming Series | "3:06 Gestation" (FX / FX Design / Tendril) | Nominated | |
| 2026 | Gotham TV Awards | Breakthrough Drama Series | Various (Note: Nominees: Noah Hawley, Dana Gonzales, Joseph E. Iberti, Clayton Krueger, Ridley Scott, and David W. Zucker) | Nominated | |
| 2026 | Gotham TV Awards | Outstanding Lead Performance in a Drama Series | Sydney Chandler | Nominated | |
| 2026 | Gotham TV Awards | Outstanding Supporting Performance in a Drama Series | Babou Ceesay | Won | |
| 2026 | Primetime Creative Arts Emmy Awards | Outstanding Cinematography for a Series (One Hour) | Dana Gonzales (for "Neverland") | Nominated | |
| 2026 | Primetime Creative Arts Emmy Awards | Outstanding Fantasy/Sci-Fi Costumes | Various (Note: Nominees: Suttirat Larlarb, Pashelle Latino, Srirattana "Bew" Wattanavitkul, and Ampa "Tiew" Bunruaeng) (for "Neverland") | Nominated | |
| 2026 | Primetime Creative Arts Emmy Awards | Outstanding Sound Editing for a Comedy or Drama Series (One Hour) | Various (Note: Nominees: Lee Gilmore, Bradley North, Chris Terhune, Nolan McNaughton, Justin M. Davey, Byron Wilson, Tim Walston, Matt "Smokey" Cloud, Beso Kacharava, Ben Schor, and Biko Gogaladze) (for "Neverland") | Nominated | |
| 2026 | Primetime Creative Arts Emmy Awards | Outstanding Special Visual Effects in a Season or Movie | Various (Note: Nominees: Jonathan Rothbart, James Ledwell, Mitchell Callisch, Woei Lee, David Fletcher, Jeffrey A. Okun, Chris Ritvo, Viktor Müller, Aladino Debert, Will Towle, Ryan Freer, and Maksim Došlo) | Nominated | |
| 2026 | Saturn Awards | Best New Genre Television Series | Alien: Earth | Nominated | |
| 2026 | Saturn Awards | Best Actress in a Television Series | Sydney Chandler | Nominated | |
| 2026 | Saturn Awards | Best Supporting Actor in a Television Series | Babou Ceesay | Nominated | |
| 2026 | TCA Awards | Outstanding New Program | Alien: Earth | Nominated | |
| 2026 | World Soundtrack Awards | Television Composer of the Year | Jeff Russo (Note: Also for Cape Fear and Citadel) | Won | |
