= Emergence (Alien: Earth) =

- Alien: Earth episode
- Episode no.: Season 1 Episode 7
- Directed by: Dana Gonzales
- Written by: Noah Hawley; Maria Melnik
- Cinematography by: Bella Gonzales; David Franco
- Editing by: Robin August
- Original air date: September 16, 2025
- Running time: 44 minutes

Guest appearance
- Kit Young as Tootles / Isaac

Episode chronology
← Previous "The Fly"	Next → "The Real Monsters"

"Emergence" is the seventh episode of the American science fiction horror television series Alien: Earth, part of the Alien franchise. The episode was written by series creator Noah Hawley and producer Maria Melnik, and directed by executive producer Dana Gonzales. It aired on FX on September 16, 2025, and was released on FX on Hulu on the same day.

The series is set in 2120, two years before the events of the original 1979 film Alien. It focuses on the space vessel Maginot crash-landing on Earth, where a young woman and a ragtag group of tactical soldiers make a discovery that puts them face-to-face with the planet's biggest threat. In the episode, Wendy decides to finally leave Neverland with Joe, while Slightly tries to get Arthur's body to Morrow.

According to Nielsen Media Research, the episode was seen by an estimated 0.385 million household viewers and gained a 0.08 ratings share among adults aged 18–49. The episode received mostly positive reviews from critics, who expressed curiosity over the introduction of "a domesticated Xenomorph", a concept which received criticism from fandom-focused outlets.

== Plot ==
Slightly hides Arthur's incapacitated body in his room, but Smee enters and finds the body. Explaining his situation, he convinces him to help him take the body to the beach, where he will deliver the body to Morrow. As security re-contains the flies and cleans the lab, Wendy is disgusted by the company trying to cover up Isaac's death as an accident.

Wendy convinces Nibs to join her and Joe in escaping the island, now that Arthur has deactivated their trackers. On her way out, Wendy hacks into the system to release the grown Xenomorph in the lab, killing many scientists. Kirsh finds Slightly and Smee trying to take Arthur's body, but to their surprise, he actually helps them take a faster route to the beach. In the outskirts, Arthur regains consciousness and the facehugger dies. He begins to remember the events and convinces them to return to get things clear. However, Arthur convulses, and a newborn Xenomorph bursts from his chest and escapes into the facility. They take the corpse to the beach, where a Yutani raid team approaches them, with Morrow leading. Seeing they failed in containing the creature, Morrow takes them captive as they enter the facility.

After Kirsh tells him the Ocellus caused the lab accident, Kavalier talks with the creature. Fascinated, he begins to consider using it to host a person to properly communicate with it, before finally declaring who is the perfect candidate. On the outskirts, Wendy, Joe, and Nibs are held at gunpoint by Yutani forces. Sensing the grown Xenomorph nearby, Wendy uses her communication skills to get the Xenomorph to kill all soldiers. She comforts it, and the creature spares them.

Morrow and his troop make their way to a compound, but they are intercepted by Kirsh, who has captured the newborn Xenomorph. Morrow is held in custody, while Slightly and Smee are taken back. Wendy, Joe, and Nibs reach the boat, but they are intercepted by Neverland enforcement. Nibs grows frustrated and brutally kills a soldier who threw her stuffed toy into the ocean, prompting Joe to incapacitate her with a gun. A shocked Wendy scolds Joe's actions, as the older Xenomorph watches in the distance.

== Production ==
=== Development ===
In August 2025, FX announced that the seventh episode of the season would be titled "Emergence", and that it would be written by series creator Noah Hawley and producer Maria Melnik, and directed by executive producer Dana Gonzales. This marked Hawley's seventh writing credit, Melnik's first writing credit, and Gonzales' third directing credit.

=== Writing ===
Hawley explained that he was fascinated by a scene in Aliens, where the alien queen interacts with the drones. He says, "One of the big question marks was if fans were going to go with this idea. I don't want her to have [a xenomorph as a] pet. But if it seems like an alliance has been struck, what are the interesting possibilities that we can pull out of that? And because this is a horror story, we have to assume that, ultimately, I wouldn't bet on this working out."

David Rysdahl commented on filming his death scene, "Putting it on, I didn't enjoy it by the end, because it had associations with trauma. Also, it's not the most comfortable, and you're covered in KY jelly, but it's still a dream come true to be able to do a chestburster scene in Alien." Adarsh Gourav also mentioned his perspective, "When the chestbuster happens, because you've now elevated your expectation and tied yourself much more to the character, the shock and the horror of it also feels that much more real."

Regarding Joe's decision to incapacitate Nibs in the ending sequence, Alex Lawther explained, "In that scene, Joe reveals that he does have a hierarchy of care at which biological humans for him take precedence over anything else in that moment. It poses a contradiction, because Joe has been saying he's the only one that knows how to probably look after the hybrid who is his sister, but perhaps that's not the truth. If he's so willing to shoot Nibs, he makes it very clear that there's an order in which he values certain lives over others. He's lacking in a way that Wendy needs him not to be, and she needs him to not shoot her friends with an electric machine gun."

== Reception ==
=== Viewers ===
In its original American broadcast, "Emergence" was seen by an estimated 0.385 million household viewers with a 0.08 in the 18–49 demographics. This means that 0.08 percent of all households with televisions watched the episode. This was a 20% decrease in viewership from the previous episode, which was seen by an estimated 0.478 million household viewers with a 0.12 in the 18–49 demographics.

=== Critical reviews ===
"Emergence" received mostly positive reviews from critics. Clint Gage of IGN gave the episode a "great" 8 out of 10 and wrote in his verdict, "Alien: Earth writes the second-to-last chapter in its first season with “Emergence.” Director Dana Gonzales and writers Noah Hawley and Maria Melnik pick up the tempo with the end of the season in sight, with a violent and gory episode full of dark and sudden shifts in mood. While the episode is significantly shorter than the others in this season so far, and it feels a little incomplete, the pace has been earned for the last six weeks. With only one episode left, the fast and bloody race to get away from Neverland is actually right on time."

Matt Schimkowitz of The A.V. Club gave the episode a "C" grade and wrote, "Counteracting its deeply pessimistic gallows humor, the series makes the risky decision to turn the Xenomorph into Wendy's Krypto. “Emergence,” written by Hawley and Maria Melnik and directed by Dana Gonzales, has pulled the trigger on the Wendy-Xenomorph team-up, a development that will surely divide the audience. Typically, you want the alien to threaten your protagonist, but by the end of this hour, we’re primed for an alien rescue. Is that really what we brought Alien to Earth for?"

Alan Sepinwall of Rolling Stone wrote, "At 45 minutes without commercials, it's by far the shortest episode to this point. And while there are several notable plot developments, all of them come at a fast clip. The result is an episode that has some exciting moments but feels more like an extended setup for the season finale than a satisfying installment in its own right."

Noel Murray of Vulture gave the episode a 4 star out of 5 rating and wrote, "“Emergence,” the penultimate episode of Alien: Earth's first season, is hybrid-heavy, mostly for the better, though occasionally for the worse. It's a short episode, primarily concerned with setting the stage for next week's finale. Much of its entertainment value comes from how well the characters set up the rest of this season’s story." Shawn Van Horn of Collider gave the episode a 9 out of 10 rating and wrote, "Alien: Earth has been fun because of just how unpredictable every episode has been. Every time you think you know where Noah Hawley's FX series is going, it takes off in a new direction with wild twists."

Eric Francisco of Esquire wrote, "I should note at this point that Kirsh told Boy Kavalier that rebooting the Lost Boys is "possible," conceptually. "Practically, we haven't cracked it," he said. Nibs might be okay, but the violence is more than enough to turn Wendy against her brother." Mary Kassel of Screen Rant wrote, "While I want to see my favorite characters survive, if only to see what they'll do next season, I'm not sure if anyone in the series has proved themselves to be incorruptible. However, that's been the fun of watching Alien: Earth so far, and I hope that Wendy and the other Hybrids come into their power even further before the series wraps up for the season."

Sean T. Collins of The New York Times wrote, "These monsters have already destroyed a robot so sophisticated it was presumed to be nearly indestructible. The hubris of the powerful is a much softer target." Paul Dailly of TV Fanatic gave the episode a 4.25 out of 5 star rating and wrote, "The penultimate episode may have been chaotic, but it was also essential. It blew apart alliances, killed off one of the show's few moral compasses, and positioned Wendy as the character to watch."
