= Observation (Alien: Earth) =

- Alien: Earth episode
- Episode no.: Season 1 Episode 4
- Directed by: Ugla Hauksdóttir
- Written by: Noah Hawley; Bobak Esfarjani
- Cinematography by: David Franco
- Editing by: Curtis Thurber
- Original air date: August 26, 2025
- Running time: 58 minutes

Guest appearance
- Kit Young as Tootles

Episode chronology
← Previous "Metamorphosis"	Next → "In Space, No One..."

"Observation" is the fourth episode of the American science fiction horror television series Alien: Earth, part of the Alien franchise. The episode was written by series creator Noah Hawley and supervising producer Bobak Esfarjani, and directed by Ugla Hauksdóttir. It aired on FX on August 26, 2025, and was released on FX on Hulu on the same day.

The series is set in 2120, two years before the events of the original 1979 film Alien. It focuses on the space vessel Maginot crash-landing on Earth, where a young woman and a ragtag group of tactical soldiers make a discovery that puts them face-to-face with the planet's biggest threat. In the episode, Wendy is given a new ability in order to communicate with the Xenomorphs, while conflicts arise with the other Lost Boys.

According to Nielsen Media Research, the episode was seen by an estimated 0.393 million household viewers and gained a 0.07 ratings share among adults aged 18–49. The episode received generally positive reviews from critics, who praised the performances and special effects, although some criticized its pacing and rehashed themes.

== Plot ==
After recovering, Wendy explains she can hear the alien. Prodigy scientist Arthur, Dame Sylvia's husband, modifies her body's audio range, as Boy Kavalier believes she can understand or even communicate with the creatures. He allows Joe to stay in Neverland, but has him work while stationed. Joe meets with Kavalier's menacing right-hand man, Atom Eins, who explains that Wendy's new synthetic body - and therefore, Wendy herself - is now Prodigy property. Disgusted, Joe attempts to quit, but is threatened with a hefty bill for his new lung and total loss of contact with Wendy if he chooses to leave.

Morrow contacts Slightly, asking him to retrieve a Xenomorph egg for him. He earns his trust by explaining that the egg belongs to him, and revealing his first name is Kumi. Slightly reveals his real name is Aarush Singh, and that he is from India. Slightly is reluctant to betray Prodigy and his friends, so Morrow pays a visit to Aarush's mother to intimidate him into obeying him. He asks Slightly to take a human to the eggs and allow a facehugger to attach itself to the victim. Unbeknownst to them, Kirsh listens to the conversation.

Kirsh and Tootles test the octopus-like specimen on a sheep, allowing it to violently gouge out the sheep's eye and attach itself to the brain. Their equipment shows a sharp rise in brain activity, implying a level of intelligence in the creature. Increasingly enamored with science and scientists, Tootles asks Kirsh if he can be renamed "Isaac" to which Kirsh agrees. Dame and Arthur begin to grow concerned with the nature of the tests and the treatment of the hybrids. Nibs surprises them by claiming she is pregnant, which they believe is impossible. During a session, Dame tries to ease Nibs' suspicions by explaining the implausibility, but Nibs becomes aggressive. After she leaves, Dame instructs security to contain her.

That night, Wendy visits the lab where Joe's lung is being monitored. Suddenly, a small Xenomorph emerges from the lung, breaking the glass. The creature does not attack Wendy, and she uses her knowledge of the language to calm and pet it.

== Production ==
=== Development ===
In July 2025, FX announced that the fourth episode of the season would be titled "Observation", and that it would be written by series creator Noah Hawley and supervising producer Bobak Esfarjani, and directed by Ugla Hauksdóttir. This marked Hawley's fourth writing credit, Esfarjani's first writing credit, and Hauksdóttir's first directing credit.

=== Writing ===
Regarding Nibs' actions in the episode, Lily Newmark explained, "it was mentioned in one of the scripts I was given that she had trauma in her previous life. And so they had to be careful with what they put her through because it could trigger that." She also added, "because it was such a strong response and pregnancy, what that has meant in the past within the Alien franchise, has signaled towards rape. It's not so far-fetched. It's incredibly bleak to consider, but we had to get there somehow." Her meeting with Dame was based on the idea that Nibs was using "fantasy mechanism" to explain the pregnancy, "which is obviously incredibly normal for a child to do." Newmark says that Nibs knows it is not true, and that the point is to show how "the power of the mind" could have been unprecedented for the adult characters.

David Rysdahl explained Arthur's concerns in the episode, "For me, the metaphor of fatherhood is a part of his journey and the arc of the unknown. They're scientists, but their love and care for these kids, and therefore their complicity in harming them, starts to subconsciously bother him."

=== Filming ===
For the scene where a specimen takes over a sheep, the series used a real sheep for filming. Hawley was content with using a real sheep, "the fact that you got the live sheep to back away from the camera [in seeming fear of The Eye], that made the whole sequence right. Because if that had been a CG sheep, there's something about sheep — being like — us going ‘uh-huh!’ and backing away from camera really sold the gag." Hawley also said that he was interested in using an eyeball as a new creature, "The face hugger literally goes into your mouth, and there's something really disturbing about that. But everyone has issues with eyeballs. It just felt like it's designed just to play into that genetic revulsion."

== Reception ==
=== Viewers ===
In its original American broadcast, "Observation" was seen by an estimated 0.393 million household viewers with a 0.07 in the 18–49 demographics. This means that 0.07 percent of all households with televisions watched the episode. This was a 11% decrease in viewership from the previous episode, which was seen by an estimated 0.441 million household viewers with a 0.10 in the 18–49 demographics.

=== Critical reviews ===
"Observation" received generally positive reviews from critics. Clint Gage of IGN gave the episode a "good" 7 out of 10 and wrote in his verdict, "“Observation” lives up to its title by examining the results of the Lost Boys' adventures on the Maginot. Writers Noah Hawley and Bobak Esfarjani raise interesting questions about the ethics of Prodigy's experimentation, but undercut them a bit by providing answers a little too quickly and concretely. It's a necessarily ponderous episode that sacrifices some pace in favor of “observation.” Still, the episode highlights include a memorably sloppy eyeball transplant and a potentially lore-changing plot twist that might prove to be a make or break moment for the entire season. Personally, I'm here for it!"

Matt Schimkowitz of The A.V. Club gave the episode a "B" grade and wrote, "Out pops a baby Xenomorph snake, and isn't it adorable? Wendy thinks so and begins petting the baby as if it were her own. But is the snake also manipulating her? Last week, the Xenomorph used Hermit as bait and lured Wendy right to it. This week, the Xeno is having full conversations with her. When a hostile alien species decides to speak, one must ask why. We should be listening to Lobot more carefully."

Alan Sepinwall of Rolling Stone wrote, "After Wendy and her brother Joe spent most of last week's installment out of action, both are up and around for “Observation,” the episode that in many ways feels like the real start of the story that Noah Hawley and company are telling with Alien: Earth. The previous three chapters introduced the idea of the Lost Boys, as well as the cold war between the corporations that rule the planet. But they also spent a lot of time mixing and matching elements of different Alien films, particularly the first two, and focusing a lot on the threat posed by the familiar Xenomorph."

Noel Murray of Vulture gave the episode a 3 star out of 5 rating and wrote, "After three straight episodes of fairly relentless science-fiction/horror action — interspersed with a few quieter, quirkier moments of kid-lit fantasy — Alien: Earth slows down considerably for episode four. “Observation” is more functional than fun, seemingly aimed at setting up the back half of season one while also filling in some gaps in the characters' backstories." Shawn Van Horn of Collider gave the episode a 9 out of 10 rating and wrote, "The hybrid is fascinated, but Kirsh doesn't look so pleased. He seems to know more than anyone how bad things are about to get."

Eric Francisco of Esquire wrote, "The first step in the scientific method — observation — basically amounts to witnessing a phenomena and asking questions about how the hell it's happening. So it's oddly fitting that "Observation," the fourth episode of Alien: Earth and the show's first-ever dud, actually feels like we're watching things unfold through the filter of a glass pane." Mary Kassel of Screen Rant wrote, "Alien: Earth episode 3 slowed down and laid the groundwork for the next phase in the series' evolution, which was necessary after the gore of the debut episodes. However, it felt like "Observation" spent its run time rehashing much of what we already know and stalling before we get back to the heart of the story."

Sean T. Collins of The New York Times wrote, "This week's episode stands out for director Ugla Hauksdottir's command of its unique visual vocabulary. The hour is festooned with slow zooms and fades, or images from one scene overlaid atop another, giving it a dreamy, almost stoned vibe. Yet the subject matter — the exploitation of children by adults who should, and indeed do, know better — is unpleasant enough to harsh anyone's mellow." Paul Dailly of TV Fanatic gave the episode a perfect 5 star out of 5 rating and wrote, "This series is firing on all cylinders, upping the intrigue with each passing episode, and most importantly, leaving me desperate for the next hour. It's rare to find a freshman sci-fi drama that balances heart, horror, and mystery this well, but Alien: Earth Season 1 Episode 4 pulled it off beautifully."

=== Accolades ===
TVLine named Sydney Chandler the "Performer of the Week" for the week of August 30, 2025, for her performance in the episode. The site wrote, "Chandler had huge shoes to fill, stepping into a franchise with an iconic female star like Sigourney Weaver, and she has precious few credits on her résumé. But she's met every expectation we had for her and surged past them, even, crafting a fascinating new character and making the series a very worthy new entry in the Alien canon."
