= Dana Gonzales =

American cinematographer (born 1963)

- Born: Dana W. Gonzales; November 18, 1963 (age 62); Los Angeles, California, U.S.
- Occupation: Director / Cinematographer
- Years active: 1986–present

Dana W. Gonzales (born November 18, 1963) is an American director and cinematographer.

== Career ==
Gonzales is a member of the American Society of Cinematographers, the Academy of Motion Picture and Sciences, and the Television Academy.

A regular cinematographer on Fargo, he won the Primetime Emmy Award for Outstanding Cinematography for a Limited Series or Movie for the episode "Waiting for Dutch".

== Filmography ==
=== Cinematographer ===
Short film

Year	Title	Director	Notes
2003	Victor and Eddie	Joe Eckardt	
2004	The Vision	Jacqueline Lesko	With Duane Charles Manwiller

Documentary film

Year	Title	Director	Notes
2005	Champion	Joe Eckardt	With Vitaly Bokser and Daniel S. Haas
2015	That Which I Love Destroys Me	Ric Roman Waugh	Also producer

Feature film

Year	Title	Director	Notes
2006	High Hopes	Joe Eckardt	With Brian Bernstein
2007	Man in the Chair	Michael Schroeder	
2008	Felon	Ric Roman Waugh	
2009	Down for Life	Alan Jacobs	With Morgan Susser
2013	Snitch	Ric Roman Waugh	
2013	Empire State	Dito Montiel	
2016	Criminal	Ariel Vromen	
2016	Incarnate	Brad Peyton	
2017	Shot Caller	Ric Roman Waugh	
2020	Greenland	Ric Roman Waugh	
2023	The Toxic Avenger	Macon Blair	

Television

Year	Title	Director	Notes
2010-2012	Pretty Little Liars		39 episodes
2010-2013	Southland		9 episodes
2013-2016	Longmire	Daniel Sackheim; J. Michael Muro	5 episodes
2015	Brooklyn Animal Control	Brian Kirk	
2014-2024	Fargo		23 episodes; Also executive producer
2017-2019	Legion		13 episodes
2019	Hanna	Sarah Adina Smith	Episodes "Forest" and "Friend"
2019	Chambers	Ti West; Geeta V. Patel; Tony Goldwyn	3 episodes
2021	SEAL Team	J. Michael Muro; Tyler Grey	Episodes "Horror Has a Face" and "Do No Harm"
2025	Alien: Earth	Noah Hawley	Episode "Neverland"; Also executive producer

=== Director ===
Short film

- The Lonely American (2016) (Also writer, producer and editor)

Feature film

- Centurion: The Dancing Stallion (2023) (Also producer)

Television

Year	Title	Episode(s)
2011	Pretty Little Liars	"The First Secret"
2020	Fargo	"The Birthplace of Civilization"
2020	Fargo	"Camp Elegance"
2020	Fargo	"Lay Away"
2020	Fargo	"Storia Americana"
2018-2019	Legion	"Chapter 18"
2018-2019	Legion	"Chapter 26"
2019	Chambers	"Murder on My Mind"
2022	The Handmaids Tale	"Border"
2022	The Handmaids Tale	"Dear Offred"
2023	The Changeling	"The Wise Ones"
2025	Alien: Earth	"Mr. October"
2025	Alien: Earth	"Metamorphosis"
2025	Alien: Earth	"Emergence"
2025	Alien: Earth	"The Real Monsters"

== Awards ==
- 2014 - Primetime Emmy Awards -Nominated, Primetime Emmy - Outstanding Cinematography for a Miniseries or Movie for Fargo (2014) -FX Network -For episode: "Buridan's Ass".
- 2016 - 68th Primetime Emmy Awards - Primetime Emmy Award for Outstanding Cinematography for a Limited Series or Movie (Fargo)
- 2017 - Camerimage -Nominated, Jury Award -Best Pilot for Legion (2017)
- 2017 - Primetime Emmy Awards -Nominated, Primetime Emmy - Outstanding Cinematography for a Limited Series or Movie for Fargo (2014)Episode: "The Law Of Vacant Places"
- 2018 - Primetime Emmy Awards - Nominated, Primetime Emmy - Outstanding Cinematography for a Single Camera Series (One-Hour) “Legion”(2018)For episode "Chapter 9"
- 2018 - American Society of Cinematographers, USA - Nominated, ASC Award - Outstanding Achievement in Cinematography in Episode of a Series for Commercial Television for Legion (2017) Episode: "Chapter 1"
- 2019 Primetime Emmy Awards - Hanna “Forrest” - OUTSTANDING CINEMATOGRAPHY FOR A SINGLE CAMERA SERIES (One Hour) - Nominee
- 2020 ASC Awards - Legion “Chapter 20” Episode of a Series for Commercial Television - Nominee
- 2021 Primetime Emmy Awards - Fargo “East/West” OUTSTANDING CINEMATOGRAPHY FOR A LIMITED SERIES OR MOVIE - Nominee
- 2021 British Society of Cinematographers - Fargo “East/West” - Best Cinematography in a Television Drama Award - Nominee
