= Sandra Yi Sencindiver =

South-Korean-born Danish-American actress (born 1980)

- Born: January 30, 1980 (age 46); Busan, South Korea
- Occupation: Actress
- Years active: 2000–present
- Television: The Bridge; Foundation

Sandra Yi Sencindiver (born 30 January 1980) is a South-Korean-born Danish-American actress, writer, and artistic director.

== Early life ==
Born in Busan, South Korea, Sencindiver and her twin-sister were adopted by an American father and Korean mother, before her father later remarried a Danish woman which saw her moving to Denmark when she was nine years old. As a child, she was encouraged to learn classical piano, sing, dance, and act. She wrote her first play at the age of ten.

== Career ==
Sencindiver started in Danish theater at age twenty when she was cast in a production of Miss Saigon.

In Denmark, she has appeared in successful series, including The Bridge and The Killing. She also did voice-work for the Assassin's Creed video game series, including the entries subtitled Valhalla and Dawn of Ragnorök. She also appeared in Backstrom. She is the artistic director of the theater company danskdansk (Danish Danish). She wrote and appeared in her own short film Watch in 2023.

Her television credits include the second series of Foundation in which she played Rue Corintha. She is also known for appearing as Lady Amalisa in the Amazon Prime Video series The Wheel of Time, a part she described as "so rich and fun to do".

In 2024, she portrayed fashion-mogul Yuji Lee in Geek Girl for Netflix. That April, she was cast in the upcoming Alien: Earth television series.

== Personal life ==
She has campaigned against structural reasons for a lack of diversity in the Danish film and television industry. She formed the diversity action group A bigger Picture (Et større Billede) alongside actresses Laura Allen Müller, Malaika B. Mosendane, Şiir Tilif, and Dorcas Joanna Hansen. Sencindiver has received invitations to meet and discuss a plan of action with the Danish Minister of Culture, the Danish Producers' Association, and the Association of Danish Film Directors, and major Scandinavian production companies and the Danish Film Institute.

== Filmography ==
=== Film ===
Year	Title	Role	Notes
2013	The Shooter	Sagsbehandler	
2013	We are, Human, after all	The Woman	Short film
2015	The Stranger	Lucy	Short film
2017	Shadow Boxer	Sygeplejerske 1	Short film

=== Television ===
Year	Title	Role	Notes
2007	The Killing	Journalist 2	1 episode
2009	2900 Happiness	Milla	Recurring role (series 3)
2010	The Protectors	Mia	2 episodes
2018	The Bridge	Susanne	Recurring role (season 4)
2019	Follow the Money	Lin	1 episode
2019	Below the Surface	Nina Sloth	Supporting cast (series 2)
2019	DNA	Sally	2 episodes
2020	Backstrom	Jaidee Kunchai	Main cast (season 1)
2021	The Wheel of Time	Lady Amalisa	2 episodes
2023	Foundation	Rue Corintha	Recurring role (season 2)
2023	Oxen	Sara Kaspersen	Recurring role (season 1), guest episode (season 2)
2024	Geek Girl	Yuji Lee	Main cast
2025	Alien: Earth	Yutani	3 episodes

=== Video games ===
Year	Title	Role	Notes
2020	Assassin's Creed: Valhalla	Ljufvina/Yanli	
2022	Assassin's Creed Valhalla - Dawn of Ragnarök		
