= MU/TH/UR =

Fictional character featured in the Alien and Predator franchises

- Alien and Predator character
- First appearance: Alien (1979)
- Created by: Dan O'Bannon; Ronald Shusett
- Voiced by: Helen Horton (Alien); Giselle Loren and Tasia Valenza (Predator: Concrete Jungle); Lorelei King (Alien: Covenant and Alien III); Martha Vincent (Alien Alone); Annemarie Griggs (Alien: Romulus); Robin August (Alien: Earth); Alison Wright (Predator: Badlands)

In-universe information
- Full name: MU/TH/UR (née Lucretia Borgia)
- Species: Artificial intelligence (formerly human)
- Gender: Female
- Title: Mother
- Affiliation: Weyland-Yutani Corporation

MU/TH/UR, commonly known as MOTHER ("Mother"), also written as MU-TH-UR, is a fictional character in the Alien and Predator franchises, an artificial intelligence acting in service of and later controlling the Weyland-Yutani Corporation, operating every ship and installation across humanity. Created by Dan O'Bannon and Ronald Shusett, she is voiced by Helen Horton in Alien, Giselle Loren and Tasia Valenza in Predator: Concrete Jungle, Lorelei King in Alien: Covenant and Alien III, Martha Vincent in Alien Alone, Annemarie Griggs in Alien: Romulus, Robin August in Alien: Earth, and Alison Wright in Predator: Badlands. Concrete Jungle explores MU/TH/UR's origin as the human Lucretia Borgia, a tech CEO whose mind was uploaded to the digital plane to replace that of her grandmother Isabella Borgia, the original MU/TH/UR.

The character received a generally positive critical reception, complimentary to the archaic mother and feminist theory.

== Fictional character biography ==
=== In Alien (1979) ===
In Alien (1979), MOTHER aboard the Nostromo awakens the crew prematurely, in order for them to investigate the signal emanating from the derelict ship. Upon Kane being infested by a Facehugger, thereby confirming the existence of a life form that could be weaponized by Weyland-Yutani, MOTHER gives Ash authorization to use whatever means necessary to keep the Alien alive, even at the expense of crew lives. With the self-destruction of the Nostromo, MOTHER's memory of the events are destroyed.

=== In Predator: Concrete Jungle (2005) ===
In Predator: Concrete Jungle (2005), MOTHER's origins are explored: the human Isabella Borgia: after expanding her lifespan using Yautja blood founding Borgia Industries, and building the city of Neonopolis together with her son Hunter out of the ruins of New Way City, formed the biological core of the first MOTHER supercomputer, governing the day-to-day operation of Neonopolis. Her human component is eventually killed in 2030 by the Yautja "Scarface", destroying her body in the center of MOTHER's core, with the Weyland-Yutani Corporation assuming control over the city in place of Borgia Industries, and installing Isabella's granddaughter and Hunter's daughter Lucretia Borgia as the new biological source of MOTHER.

=== In Alien: Covenant (2017) ===
In Alien: Covenant (2017), MOTHER aboard the Covenant maintains a more passive role, with her predominantly providing analytics upon request. When Tennessee attempts to lower the ship's altitude to a dangerously close proximity to the storm above the Engineer home world, MOTHER rejects the order and has to be overridden by both Tennessee and Upworth. MOTHER detects an Alien aboard the Covenant and provides the surviving crew members with information of the creature's location, as well as responding to their orders for corralling it.

=== In Alien Alone (2019) ===
In Alien Alone (2019), MOTHER appears onboard the Weyland-Yutani Corporation vessel Otranto, refusing to allow the synthetic Hope access to the Alien specimens onboard until her ability to communicate with Hope is shut down.

=== In Alien III (2019) ===
In William Gibson's Alien III (2019), MOTHER appears onboard Anchorpoint Station, in the domain of the socialist UPP (Union of Progressive Peoples).

=== In Alien: Romulus (2024) ===
In Alien: Romulus (2024), MOTHER appears onboard the connected Weyland-Yutani Corporation vessels Romulus and Remus.

=== In Alien: Earth (2025) ===
In the first season of Alien: Earth (2025), Yutani-loyal cyborg Morrow contacts MOTHER onboard the Weyland-Yutani Corporation vessel Maginot, in the episode "In Space, No One...".

=== In Predator: Badlands (2025) ===
In Predator: Badlands (2025), MOTHER is now in charge of the Weyland-Yutani Corporation, ordering a synthetic crew led by Tessa to capture the extraterrestrial beast known as the Kalisk, able to regenerate its flesh, informing her of Thia being in the company of the Yautja Dek. Later, after Tessa has captured the Kalisk and Dek, and Dek escapes, she lies to MOTHER about Dek's death to cover up her faults.

== Merchandise ==
MU/TH/UR is featured as a playable character in the 2024 expansion Building Better Worlds to the role-playing game Alien: The Roleplaying Game, while the Blu-ray box set Alien Anthology featured as MU-TH-UR mode based on the A.I. to keep track of one's progress through watching the set.

== Reception ==
The character MOTHER is most commonly psychoanalyzed as be complementary to the feminist theory. The most commonly referenced pertaining to the subject is the Barbara Creed book, The Monstrous-Feminine: Film, Feminism, Psychoanalysis, which perceives MOTHER as being complementary to the archaic mother theme of the 1979 film. Creed cites the crew members being awoken by a figure dubbed "MOTHER" in a womb-like room, without a father figure, and with the comprehensive directive to provide life support, as being the poignant indicator to support her conclusion. Likewise, in Beyond the Stars: Locales in American popular film by Paul Loukides and Linda K. Fuller, MOTHER is presented as the central focus for the context of a mother ship. As the authors describe, MOTHER maintains an intimate connection with the crew, providing a watchful eye when they are asleep, as well as a small, womb-like computer module for direct communication about sensitive matters.

Paranormal Pajama Party spoke of MOTHER as "represent[ing] a system of control that's more constricting than a facehugger. The irony of naming this mechanised overseer “mother” is particularly poignant. It's a unique take on femininity, transforming the concept of nurturing into a tool of control. It's as if society took the idea of motherhood and reshaped it to serve a different master." The Astromech noted her as "represent[ing] the intersection of technology, authority, and the dehumanizing effects of corporate control [whose] impersonal nature and unwavering obedience to corporate commands make it a symbol of the cold, calculating aspects of advanced technology and bureaucracy [and whose] lack of empathy or moral consideration underscores the vulnerability of [humanity] at the mercy of both a dangerous alien creature and a corporation willing to sacrifice human lives for profit [with this] duality — MUTHUR as both a life-sustaining system and a tool of corporate exploitation — add[ing] a layer of tension and paranoia to the narrative." No Film School called MU/TH/UR one of "the greatest AI villains ever made", noting the character "doesn't get enough love because way too much is going on in the Alien franchise [and] represents corporate-controlled artificial intelligence at its most chilling."

== Appearances ==
- Alien (1979)
- Predator: Concrete Jungle (2005)
- Alien: Isolation (2014)
- Alien: Covenant – Origins (2017)
- Alien: Covenant (2017)
- Alien Alone (2019)
- Alien III (2019)
- Alien: Into Charybdis (2021)
- Aliens: Fireteam Elite (2021)
- Aliens: Dark Descent (2023)
- Alien: Romulus (2024)
- Alien: Black, White & Blood (2024)
- Alien: The Roleplaying Game: Building Better Worlds (2024)
- Alien: Earth (2025)
- Predator: Badlands (2025)

== Sources ==
- Creed, Barbara (1992). The Monstrous-Feminine: Film, Feminism, Psychoanalysis. Routledge. ISBN 978-0415052597.
- Loukides, Paul; Fuller, Linda K. (1993). Beyond the Stars 4: Locales in American Popular Film (Vol.4). Popular Press. ISBN 978-0879725891.
