= Predator: Concrete Jungle =

2005 action video game

- European PS2 cover art
- Developer: Eurocom
- Publisher: Vivendi Universal Games (Note: Released in PAL regions under the Sierra Entertainment brand name)
- Director: John Whiston
- Designers: William Beacham; Andrew Collins; Kev Harrison; Matthew Humphries; Richard Foster; Tim Browne
- Programmers: Ashley Finney; Simon Mills; Greg Irwin; Jason Gosling; Joel Garabedian; Mike Halsall
- Writer: Grant Morrison
- Composer: Ian Livingstone
- Platforms: PlayStation 2, Xbox
- Release: EU: 15 April 2005; NA: 27 April 2005
- Genre: Action
- Mode: Single-player

Predator: Concrete Jungle is a 2005 action video game developed by Eurocom for the PlayStation 2 and Xbox consoles. In the game the player controls a disgraced Predator who must regain his honor by killing the humans who have stolen his technology. The game is named after the first volume of the Dark Horse Comics Predator comics series, but does not share the same plot.

== Gameplay ==
The game also has several bonus missions in which the player can earn rewards including costumes, weapons, and increased health and energy. A variety of weapons are used in the game, falling into the categories of melee and ranged weapons. A number of the weapons reflect those used in the Predator and Alien vs. Predator films, though others are new. The player can also use mines and bombs. Weapon upgrades are found in some of the stages. The player can also use items, such as medical kits which restore health. In first-person mode, the player can use vocal mimicry to distract or lure an enemy, while in third-person mode the player can emit a roar. During gameplay, the Predator generally emits lion, tiger, leopard, and jaguar growls.

== Plot ==
The game begins in 1930, as an unnamed Predator hunts and kills American Mafia boss Bruno Borgia. Bruno's wife, Isabella, wounds the Predator, causing its blood to spill onto her and her newborn son, Hunter. The Predator fails to escape and is exiled for exposing its species.

A century later, now called "Scarface", the Predator seeks redemption by reclaiming stolen Predator technology from criminal factions in Neonopolis. Scarface eliminates rival gangs, fights cybernetic mercenaries, and eventually confronts Lucretia Borgia, Bruno’s granddaughter, who has discovered his identity. It is revealed that Isabella and Hunter have attained a form of immortality by dosing themselves with Predator blood, with Hunter having transformed into a Predator-human hybrid, and Isabella having become the biological core of the artificial intelligence MOTHER.

Scarface slays Hunter and Isabella, marking his victory with a blood sign before being retrieved by his clan. Meanwhile, the slain Lucretia's brain is revived and instituted as the new MOTHER: AI overseer of Neonopolis under the Weyland-Yutani Corporation.

== Cast ==
- Aimée Leigh and Sarah Brown as Scarface / The Predator (sound effects)
- Tasia Valenza as Isabella Borgia / MOTHER
- Giselle Loren as Lucretia Borgia / MOTHER
- Fred Tatasciore as Bruno Borgia
- Armando Valdes-Kennedy as El Hongo
- David Sobolov as Hunter Borgia

== Development ==
Predator: Concrete Jungle makes several links between the films of the Alien, Predator, and Alien vs. Predator franchises. The film Predator 2 also featured a powerful Jamaican gang with a leader named King Willie. Hunter mentions to Lucretia that he knew Charles Bishop Weyland "before he disappeared"; Weyland appeared in the film Alien vs. Predator (2004) leading an expedition to the Antarctic, where he was killed by a Predator. The Yutani Corporation is also mentioned, referencing the Weyland-Yutani Corporation of the Alien films. MOTHER, the name of the computer controlling New Way City/Neonopolis in 2030, is also the name of the Nostromo's computer intelligence in Alien (1979). Several other references to the film franchises are made throughout the game, including the appearance of Aliens.

== Reception ==
Reception

Aggregate score
Aggregator	Score	
Aggregator	PS2	Xbox
Metacritic	47/100	46/100

Review scores
Publication	Score	
Publication	PS2	Xbox
Electronic Gaming Monthly	4.83/10	4.83/10
Game Informer	2.75/10	2.75/10
GamePro	2/5	2/5
GameSpot	5.3/10	5.3/10
GameSpy	1.5/5	1.5/5
GameTrailers	7.4/10	7.4/10
IGN	5.5/10	5.5/10
Official U.S. PlayStation Magazine	2.5/5	N/A
Official Xbox Magazine (US)	N/A	2.4/10
VideoGamer.com	4/10	4/10

The game received "generally unfavorable reviews" on both platforms according to the review aggregation website Metacritic. IGN called it "a good idea gone bad", and cited the game's poor controls and awkward gameplay as factors. Similarly, GameSpot criticized the game's storyline and graphics.

== See also ==
- List of Alien, Predator, and Alien vs. Predator games
