= Phallic woman =

Psychoanalytical concept

In psychoanalysis, phallic woman is a concept to describe a woman with the symbolic attributes of the phallus. More generally, it describes any woman possessing traditionally masculine characteristics.

== Phallic mother ==
Freud considered that at the phallic stage of early childhood development, children of both sexes attribute possession of a penis to the mother—a belief the loss of which helps precipitate the castration complex. Thereafter males may seek fetishistic substitutes in women for the lost penis in the form of high heels, earrings or long hair to alleviate the castrative threat—terrifying phallic women such as witches (with their broomsticks) representing the failure of such substitutes to cover the underlying anxiety. The female, whose love (in Freud's view) was originally "directed to her phallic mother", may thereafter either turn to her father for love, or may return to an identification with the original phallic mother in a neurotic development.

The phallic mother can be (though need not necessarily be) an actively castrative figure, stifling her children by pre-empting all room for autonomous action.

Elements of the phallic mother concept may persist in men through the misconception of one's mother as castrated rather than naturally non-phallic, which the gives rise to castration anxiety in oneself, embodied in turn by the castrating mother and vagina dentata.

== Phallus girl ==
Rather than seeking or identifying with the phallic mother, libido may instead be directed at the figure that has been termed the phallus girl. For the male, the phallus girl may be represented by a younger (perhaps boyish) girl, in whom he can find an image of his own adolescent self. For the female, such a position may either entail a submissive merger with the male partner (identification with a body-part), or an exhibitionist display of the self as phallus: as Ella Sharpe put it of a dancer, "she was the magical phallus. The dancing was in her".

Soft porn marks out the phallus girl through such symbols as whips, bikes and guns; while she also underpins the action heroine such as Ripley or Lara Croft.

=== Later developments ===
The twenty-first century ladette can be seen as a phallic girl—her emphasis on light-hearted, recreational sex serving as a passport to being 'one of the boys'.

== Artistic analogues ==
- Picasso in the interwar years produced many paintings of women with phallic attributes.
- Buffy the Vampire Slayer demonstrates an ambivalent relationship to her phallic power as slayer/staker.

== See also ==
- Archaic mother
- Femme fatale
- Feminist views on the Oedipus complex
- Film theory
- Philogyny
- Robert C. Bak
- Surrealism
- Transvestism
- Tomboy
