= Giselle Loren =

American actress

Giselle Loren is an American actress most known for her voice-over work in animation and video games. She voiced Adélie Chica in Happy Feet, Stargirl in Justice League Unlimited, and Martha Connors in Spider-Man: The Animated Series.

She is perhaps best known for having voiced the character of Buffy Summers in two Buffy the Vampire Slayer video games (Buffy the Vampire Slayer and Buffy the Vampire Slayer: Chaos Bleeds). She also played Buffy in the unaired pilot episode of the Buffy the Vampire Slayer animated series.

Her live-action work has been limited so far. She appeared in the short film The Caretaker and also played the role of a female police officer in detective drama Nancy Drew in 2002.

== Filmography ==
Year	Title	Role	Notes	Source
1994–1997	Spider-Man: The Animated Series	Martha Connors	Voice, 4 episodes	
1999	T'ai Fu: Wrath of the Tiger	Lotus	Voice, video game	
1999	The Portrait	Sally	Short	
2001	Arcanum: Of Steamworks and Magick Obscura	M'in Gorad	Voice, video game	
2001	The Caretaker	Elizabeth Santoz	Short	
2002	Buffy the Vampire Slayer	Buffy Summers	Voice, video game	
2003	Buffy the Vampire Slayer: Chaos Bleeds	Buffy Summers, Anya	Voice, video game	
2004	Buffy: The Animated Series	Buffy Summers	Voice	
2005	Predator: Concrete Jungle	Lucretia Borgia / MOTHER	Voice, video game	
2005-2006	Justice League Unlimited	Stargirl	Voice, 3 episodes	
2006	Happy Feet	Adélie Chica	Voice	
2007	Tom Clancy's Ghost Recon Advanced Warfighter 2			

== Producer ==
- Black Batman: Batman Evolution (Black Batman: Evolution) - short Film TV (soon)
