= The Psychotronic Video Guide =

1996 book by Michael J. Weldon

- Cover
- Author: Michael J. Weldon
- Language: English
- Subject: Cult movies
- Publisher: St. Martin's Griffin
- Publication date: 1996
- Publication place: United States
- Media type: Print
- Pages: 646
- ISBN: 0-312-13149-6
- OCLC: 32430929
- Dewey Decimal: PN1995.9.S284 W46 1996
- LC Class: 791.436353

The Psychotronic Video Guide is a 1996 book written by Michael J. Weldon.

== Contents ==
The Psychotronic Video Guide is a book in which a sequel to Weldon's 1983 The Psychotronic Encyclopedia of Film, compiles 3,000 reviews of cult, genre, and obscure cinematic offerings. Beyond serving as a catalog of unconventional films, it includes buying tips and resources to help readers locate rare titles, acknowledging the difficulty of finding such material through typical retail channels.

== Reception ==
The Psychotronic Video Guide was reviewed in Arcane magazine, which stated that it was "Good reference material."

== Reviews ==
- Review by Edward Bryant (1996) in Locus, #427 August 1996
- Review by Don D'Ammassa (1996) in Science Fiction Chronicle, #190 October 1996
- Review by Stephen Payne (1997) in Vector 192
- Review by Steve Swires (1997) in Fangoria, May 1997
- Review by Joey Zone (1997) in Science Fiction Eye, #15, Fall 1997
