= Dar Dash =

American actor

- Born: Fairfax County, Virginia, U.S.
- Occupation: Actor
- Years active: 2007–present

Dar Dash is an American actor. After receiving his degree at Arts Educational Schools, in London, he starred in The Glass Cage at the Northampton Theatre Royal, where he made his stage debut.

== Early life ==
Dash was born and raised in Fairfax, Virginia. His father is of Persian descent, and his mother is Cuban with Spanish ancestry. Dash is the middle of five sons.

== Career ==
Dash has appeared in several stage productions and in the AMC mini-series The Prisoner; the 2011 Raindance Film Festival nominated independent film, City Slacker; in Ridley Scott's thriller The Counselor; and BBC's Jonathan Creek.

In 2014, Dash was nominated for Best Supporting Actor in a short at the Action On Film International Film Festival for his performance in the internationally acclaimed short film Warhol, in which he co-starred alongside Corey Johnson.

In October 2017, Dash played famed Richard Nixon speechwriter and New York Times columnist William Safire in the play In The Event of Moon Disaster at Theatre503 in London. In its review, the Evening Standard described Dash's portrayal as "robust" and "droll" and the overall production also received considerable critical acclaim.

In March 2018, Dash was nominated for Best Supporting Performance in a Comedy at the NAVGTR Awards for his performance as Hawkeye in Lego Marvel Super Heroes 2.

In 2012, Dash and Alexis Peterman opened Drink Me Eat Me, a "treat boutique" and event space. Dash and Peterman sold the company in August 2015.

== Filmography ==
=== Film ===
Year	Title	Role	Notes
2012	City Slacker	Alex	
2012	Darkness Into Light	Haman	
2013	The Counselor	Barman	
2014	Warhol	Frank Lockwood	Best Supporting Actor Nominee in a short film at the 2014 Action On Film International Film Festival
2015	Florence Foster Jenkins	Antonio	
2018	Taarof	Omid	Short film - Winner Best Dramedy Short at 2019 London Independent Film Awards
2021	Admission	Hassan	
2022	All the Old Knives	Bartender	
2023	Warhol	Pauly	Winner of Best Ensemble Cast at the 2024 Paris International Film Festival
2023	Anwhere But the Bed	Sam	Short Film
2025	Giant	US Commentator	
2026	Just Play Dead	Mr. Brody	

=== Television ===
Year	Title	Role	Notes
2009	Free Agents	Pete	
2009	The Prisoner	46-5	Miniseries, episode: "Episode 2: Harmony"
2014	Jonathan Creek	Kevin	Episode: "The Curse of the Bronze Lamp"
2019	Absentia	Noah Scott	Episode: "Offenders"
2020	Das Boot	Joe Minton	Episode: “Survival Strategies”
2020	Elvis: Are You Lonesome Tonight	Larry Geller	Television film
2022	Ten Percent	Jay Weinstock	Episode 1
2024	Piglets	Director	Episode: “Questioning”
2025	FBI: International	Rafael Ferrer	Episode: "They May Get Their Wish"

=== Video games ===
Year	Title	Role	Notes
2012	Forza Horizon	Zaki Malik	Voice and motion capture
2015	Guitar Hero Live	Various	
2017	Xenoblade Chronicles 2	Dagas	
2017	Tom Clancy's Ghost Recon Wildlands	Dengoso	
2017	Lego Marvel Super Heroes 2	Hawkeye, Wonder Man	Nominated for Best Supporting Performance in a Comedy at the 2018 NAVGTR Awards
2018	A Way Out	Various	
2019	Tom Clancy's Ghost Recon Breakpoint	Various	
2019	Another Eden	Dunarith	
2020	Cyberpunk 2077	Vazquez	
2020	Operation FROST	Various	
2022	LifeAfter Season 4: The 2nd Outbreak	Marion	
2022	CrossfireX	Various	
2023	Payday 3	Cloaker	
2023	Cyberpunk 2077	Various	Phantom Liberty expansion
2024	Age of Water	Jimmy Beam	
2026	Ace Combat 8: Wings of Theve	Girish Toprak	

=== Miscellaneous ===
Year	Title	Role	Notes
2019	Alien 3	Tully	Audio Drama (Audible)
2025	Kramer vs Kramer	Ron Willis and Judge Atkins	Radio Drama BBC Radio 4
