= The Collective (company) =

Defunct American video game developer

The Collective, Inc.
- Company type: Subsidiary
- Industry: Video games
- Founded: 1997; 29 years ago
- Founder: Douglas Hare; Richard Hare; Gary Priest
- Defunct: October 9, 2007
- Fate: Merged with Shiny Entertainment
- Successor: Double Helix Games
- Headquarters: Newport Beach, California, US
- Parent: Foundation 9 Entertainment (2005–2007)
- Website: collectivestudios.com (archived)

The Collective, Inc. was an American video game developer based in Newport Beach, California. Founded in 1997 by ex-Virgin Entertainment employees, the company merged with Backbone Entertainment in 2005 to create Foundation 9 Entertainment. Under Foundation 9, The Collective was merged with Shiny Entertainment and into Double Helix Games in October 2007.

== History ==
The Collective was founded in 1997 by brothers Douglas and Richard Hare, together with Gary Priest, upon leaving Virgin Interactive. Works by The Collective include Star Trek: Deep Space Nine: The Fallen, Buffy the Vampire Slayer, Indiana Jones and the Emperor's Tomb, Marc Ecko's Getting Up: Contents Under Pressure, and The Da Vinci Code.

On March 29, 2005, it was announced that The Collective was merging with Backbone Entertainment, another game developer, to form Foundation 9 Entertainment. The Collective's Douglas Hare, Richard Hare and Gary Priest became the new company's co-president, chief creative officer and co-chairman, respectively. On October 9, 2007, Foundation 9 announced that The Collective were being merged with another subsidiary, Shiny Entertainment; both studios had relocated their teams to new 60,000-square-foot (5,600 m^{2}) offices in Irvine, California, from where the merged company would operate under the lead of Shiny's Michael Persson. In March 2008, the new studio was named Double Helix Games.

== Games developed ==
Year	Title	Platform(s)	Publisher(s)	Note(s)
1998	Men in Black: The Game	PlayStation	Gremlin Interactive	Port of a PC game developed by Gigawatt Studio and published by SouthPeak Interactive.
1998	The Game of Life	PlayStation	Hasbro Interactive	Port of a PC game developed by Mass Media.
2000	Star Trek: Deep Space Nine: The Fallen	Microsoft Windows, Macintosh	Simon & Schuster Interactive	Developed using Unreal Engine.
2002	Buffy the Vampire Slayer	Xbox	Electronic Arts	First game developed using the studio's proprietary Slayer Engine, which would be used for every game hereafter.
2003	Indiana Jones and the Emperor's Tomb	Xbox, PlayStation 2, Microsoft Windows, OS X	LucasArts	
2004	Wrath Unleashed	Xbox, PlayStation 2	LucasArts	
2004	The X-Files: Resist or Serve	PlayStation 2	Vivendi Universal Games	Only involved in early design work before Black Ops Entertainment took over the project.
2005	Star Wars: Episode III – Revenge of the Sith	Xbox, PlayStation 2	LucasArts	
2006	Marc Ecko's Getting Up: Contents Under Pressure	Xbox, PlayStation 2, Microsoft Windows	Atari	
2006	The Da Vinci Code	Xbox, PlayStation 2, Microsoft Windows	2K Games	

== Cancelled games ==
Several games are known to have been in development at the studio before they were cancelled. That includes games based on licenses such as Witchblade, a follow-up to their Indiana Jones title, a game featuring Jonathan Harker from Dracula, and Dirty Harry.
