= Cult Movies 2 =

1983 book by Danny Peary

- Author: Danny Peary
- Language: English
- Subject: Cult films
- Publisher: Delta Books
- Publication date: 1983
- Publication place: United States
- Media type: Print
- Preceded by: Cult Movies
- Followed by: Cult Movies 3

Cult Movies 2 is a 1983 book by Danny Peary, a follow-up to his 1980 book Cult Movies. Just like its predecessor it consists of a series of essays regarding what Peary described as the most representative examples of the cult film phenomenon. This book covered fifty films not among the hundred in the first volume.

== Content ==
The films are presented in alphabetical order, with each chapter featuring a story synopsis for the covered title, Peary’s response to the film, production and release details, and a brief selection of contemporary critical reviews. The book features one guest contributor, Henry Blinder, who wrote the essay on Willy Wonka & the Chocolate Factory. A sequel to this book came out in 1988: Cult Movies 3.

== Publication history ==
Certain chapters from Cult Movies 2 were republished in 2014 as a thematically connected e-book, bringing together essays about cult movies from certain genres.

== Films ==
- Altered States (1980)
- Der Amerikanische Freund (The American Friend, 1977)
- Barbarella (1968)
- Basket Case (1982)
- Beat the Devil (1953)
- Bedazzled (1968)
- The Big Heat (1953)
- Blood Feast (1963)
- Blood Money (1933)
- A Boy and His Dog (1975)
- Breathless (À Bout de Souffle) (1960)
- Bride of Frankenstein (1935)
- Children of Paradise (Les Enfants du Paradis) (1945)
- A Clockwork Orange (1971)
- Cutter's Way (1981)
- Dark Star (1974)
- Daughters of Darkness (1971)
- The First Nudie Musical (1976)
- Godzilla (1954)
- The Great Texas Dynamite Chase (1976)
- High School Confidential (1958)
- His Girl Friday (1940)
- Last Tango in Paris (1972)
- The Man Who Fell to Earth (1976)
- Marnie (1964)
- Massacre at Central High (1976)
- Mommie Dearest (1981)
- Monty Python and the Holy Grail (1975)
- Morgan - A Suitable Case for Treatment (1966)
- Ms. 45 (1981)
- My Darling Clementine (1946)
- Night of the Demon (1957)
- Nightmare Alley (1947)
- The Parallax View (1974)
- Phantom of the Paradise (1974)
- Picnic at Hanging Rock (1975)
- Pretty Baby (1978)
- Quadrophenia (1979)
- Salt of the Earth (1954)
- The Seventh Seal (1957)
- Some Like It Hot (1959)
- Sullivan's Travels (1942)
- Taxi Driver (1976)
- To Be or Not to Be (1942)
- Vanishing Point (1971)
- White Heat (1949)
- The Wicker Man (1973)
- Willy Wonka & the Chocolate Factory (1971)
- Wuthering Heights (1939)
- Zardoz (1974)
