= Tasia Valenza =

American actress

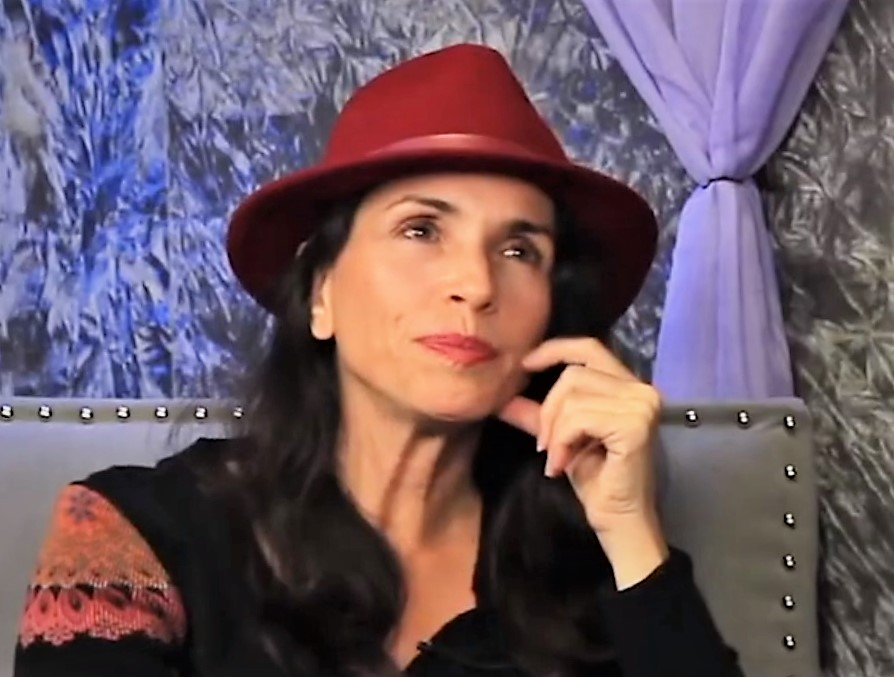
- Valenza on VO Buzz Weekly in 2020
- Occupation: Actress
- Years active: 1982–present
- Spouse: Harvey Stern (m. 1995)
- Children: 3

Tasia Valenza is an American actress. She is most known for being the voice of Poison Ivy in the Arkham series from 2009 to 2015 as well as in a number of other video games, such as Sniper Wolf in Metal Gear Solid and her various roles in the Star Wars Universe.

== Personal life ==
Tasia Valenza's twin brother is a former television writer and now solar marketing consultant Tor Alexander Valenza. She also has an older brother, Greg. Valenza has been married to Harvey Stern since 1995 and has three children.

== Career ==
In the early part of her career, Valenza played the role of Dottie Thornton on All My Children from 1982 to 1986, earning a Daytime Emmy nomination for her work. She also showed up in a guest star appearance in the fifth season of The A-Team, and a recurring role as Lieutenant Winslow in Space: Above and Beyond. She also portrayed Jodie Abramovitz in Aaron Spelling's drama series The Heights.

Valenza appeared in the 1988 Star Trek: The Next Generation episode "Coming of Age" as a Vulcan Academy entrance exam cadet along side Wesley Crusher. She returned to Star Trek in 2017 with a voiceover role in the first two episodes of Star Trek: Discovery as the computer voice of the USS Shenzhou.

Valenza is best known to play female characters in comic book based video games, predominantly villains in video games such as Batman: Arkham Asylum, where she played fan-favorite character Poison Ivy, as well as multiple Spider-Man games. In January 2023, Valenza guest voiced a character, Tawni Ames, the Separatist governor of Desix, who opposes the Empire's occupation, on Star Wars: The Bad Batch. She also had a recurring role as the Jedi Shaak Ti in Star Wars: The Clone Wars.

== Filmography ==
=== Film ===
| Year | Title | Role | Notes |
|---|---|---|---|
| 1984 | Crackers | Maria | |
| 1985 | Rappin' | Dixie | |
| 1987 | My Demon Lover | Miguela | |

=== Television ===
| Year | Title | Role | Notes |
|---|---|---|---|
| 1982–1986 | All My Children | Dottie Thornton Martin | |
| 1986 | The A-Team | Bonita Gallegos | Episode: "The Theory of Revolution" |
| 1987 | Fame | Denise Hudson | Episode: "Stradi-Various" |
| 1987 | 21 Jump Street | Lacey King | Episode: "16 Blown to 35" |
| 1987 | Hunter | Lupe Ortiz | Episode: "Playing God" |
| 1987 | Highway to Heaven | Maria Rojas | Episode: "Why Punish the Children" |
| 1988 | Supercarrier | Extra | Episode: "Deadly Enemies (Pilot)" |
| 1988 | Star Trek: The Next Generation | T'Shanik | Episode: "Coming of Age" |
| 1989 | Cheers | Customer | Episode: "Don't Paint Your Chickens" |
| 1991 | Good Grief | Elke | Episode: "13th Episode Anniversary Special" |
| 1991 | Sometimes They Come Back | Kate | Television film |
| 1991 | Adam-12 | Lucinda Caralis | Episode: "Drive-By" |
| 1992 | The Heights | Jodie Abramowitz | 13 episodes |
| 1995 | Duckman | Live Action "Bernice" Actress | Episode: "Papa Oom M.O.W. M.O.W." |
| 1995–1996 | Space: Above and Beyond | Lt. Kelly Anne Winslow | 4 episodes |
| 1996 | One West Waikiki | Amy Shigeta | Episode: "Guilty" |
| 1999–2001 | The Bold and the Beautiful | Suzanne | |
| 2017–2018 | Star Trek: Discovery | USS Shenzhou Computer (voice) | 6 episodes |

=== Animation ===
| Year | Title | Role | Notes |
|---|---|---|---|
| 1994 | Batman: The Animated Series | Mariam | Episode: "Baby-Doll" |
| 1994 | Aaahh!!! Real Monsters | Vlorina, Monster #2 | Episode: "Smile and Say Oblina/The Great Wave" |
| 1996 | Superman: The Animated Series | Policewoman | Episode: "Feeding Time" |
| 1997 | The Real Adventures of Jonny Quest | Jade | 2 episodes |
| 1997 | Spicy City | Margo | Episode: "An Eye for an Eye" |
| 1998 | Tekkaman Blade II | Natasha Pablochiva | English dub |
| 1998 | The New Batman Adventures | Female Cultist | Episode: "Cult of the Cat" |
| 2000 | The Wild Thornberrys | Camel | Episode: "Gobi Yourself" |
| 2000–01 | Batman Beyond | Servant Girl #1, Female Cop | 2 episodes |
| 2002–04 | Ozzy & Drix | Maria Amino | 14 episodes |
| 2003–04 | Duck Dodgers | Senorita Theresa, Vampire Bride #2 | 2 episodes |
| 2003–05 | What's New, Scooby-Doo? | Brooke Bjork, Lupe Chesares, Wormian #2 | 2 episodes |
| 2005–06 | Danger Rangers | Gabriella, London Reporter, Raccoon Kid #2, Firefighter #3, Ana | 15 episodes |
| 2010 | Dirty Little Secret | Malina Vila Nova, Admirer | 10 episodes |
| 2010–14 | Star Wars: The Clone Wars | Shaak Ti | 5 episodes |
| 2019–20 | Star Wars Resistance | Venisa Doza | 3 episodes |
| 2023 | Star Wars: The Bad Batch | Tawni Ames | Episode: "The Solitary Clone" |

=== Video games ===
| Year | Title | Role | Notes |
|---|---|---|---|
| 1996 | Leisure Suit Larry: Love for Sail! | Annette Boning, Female Ship's Announcer | |
| 1998 | Leisure Suit Larry's Casino | Annette Boning | |
| 1998 | Metal Gear Solid | Sniper Wolf, Computer | English dub Credited as Julie Monroe |
| 1998 | King's Quest: Mask of Eternity | Sara, Sylph | |
| 1999 | Star Wars Episode I: The Phantom Menace | Ann Gella, Coruscant Female, Gungan Female | |
| 1999 | Revenant | Kylie, Townswomen | |
| 1999 | Metal Gear Solid: Integral | Sniper Wolf | Credited as Julie Monroe |
| 1999 | Battlezone II: Combat Commander | Yelena Shabayev | |
| 1999 | Indiana Jones and the Infernal Machine | Sophia Hapgood | |
| 2000 | Star Wars: Demolition | Aurra Sing | |
| 2000 | Ground Control | Enrica Hayes, Squad Voice, Dropship Voice #15 | |
| 2000 | Draconus: Cult of the Wyrm | Aeowyn | |
| 2000 | Vampire Hunter D | Leila | |
| 2000 | Ground Control: Dark Conspiracy | Enrica Hayes, Unit #7 | |
| 2001 | Arcanum: Of Steamworks and Magick Obscura | Raven | |
| 2001 | Max Steel: Covert Missions | Dawn | |
| 2002 | Age of Mythology | Reginleif | |
| 2003 | Crimson Skies: High Road to Revenge | "Brooklyn" Betty Charles | |
| 2003 | Age of Mythology: The Titans | Reginleif | |
| 2004 | Metal Gear Solid: The Twin Snakes | Sniper Wolf, Computer | |
| 2004 | Spider-Man 2 | Female Thugs, Additional voices | |
| 2005 | Samurai Western | Claudia, Child #2 | |
| 2005 | Predator: Concrete Jungle | Isabella Borgia / Mother | |
| 2005 | Age of Empires III | Amelia Black | |
| 2006 | Baten Kaitos Origins | Valara | |
| 2006 | Marvel: Ultimate Alliance | Spider-Woman | |
| 2007 | Spider-Man 3 | Female Thugs | |
| 2007 | Neverwinter Nights 2: Mask of the Betrayer | Nadaj, Female Hardened Battler, Female Dwarf | |
| 2008 | Too Human | Hel | |
| 2008 | Saints Row 2 | Monica Hughes | |
| 2009 | Stormrise | Vantage | |
| 2009 | Dissidia Final Fantasy | Ultimecia | |
| 2009 | Batman: Arkham Asylum | Poison Ivy, Martha Wayne | |
| 2011 | Dissidia 012 Final Fantasy | Ultimecia | |
| 2011 | Batman: Arkham City | Poison Ivy | |
| 2011 | Saints Row: The Third | Monica Hughes | |
| 2011 | Star Wars: The Old Republic | Kaliyo Djannis | |
| 2013 | Marvel Heroes | Madame Hydra | |
| 2014 | The Elder Scrolls Online | Additional Voices | |
| 2014 | WildStar | Avra Darko, Ekose Female | |
| 2014 | The Evil Within | Myra Hanson | |
| 2015 | Infinite Crisis | Poison Ivy | |
| 2015 | Batman: Arkham Knight | Poison Ivy, Kate Kane | |
| 2015 | Leo's Fortune | Mathilda | |
| 2017 | Injustice 2 | Poison Ivy | |
| 2018 | Dissidia Final Fantasy NT | Ultimecia | |
| 2018 | Lego DC Super-Villains | Poison Ivy | |
| 2018 | Epic Seven | Command Model Laika | |
| 2019 | Mobius Final Fantasy | Ultimecia | |
| 2023 | Justice League: Cosmic Chaos | Poison Ivy / Lois Lane / Momo | |
| 2025 | Doom: The Dark Ages | Sentinel Facility Voice | |
| 2025 | The Outer Worlds 2 | Former Seer Anais Bujold | |
