= Buffy the Vampire Slayer (2002 video game) =

2002 Xbox video game

- North American cover art
- Developer: The Collective
- Publishers: Electronic Arts; Fox Interactive
- Producer: Trevor Snowden
- Designers: James Goddard; Tony Barnes
- Artists: Chris Aguilar; Daniel Cabuco; Kye-wan Sung
- Writers: Christopher Golden; Thomas Sniegoski
- Composers: Steven von Kampen; Tony Barnes
- Platform: Xbox
- Release: NA: August 19, 2002; PAL: September 13, 2002
- Genres: Action-adventure, beat 'em up
- Mode: Single-player

Buffy the Vampire Slayer is a 2002 action-adventure beat 'em up game developed by The Collective and co-published by Fox Interactive and Electronic Arts for the Xbox. It is the second video game based on the Buffy the Vampire Slayer franchise, and the first for a home console. The story is set during the third season of the TV series, and follows Buffy Summers as she and her friends and allies attempt to thwart the plans of an ancient being who seeks to conquer the world. Gameplay focuses on fighting vampires and other supernatural enemies using hand-to-hand combat as well as various melee and ranged weapons.

The game was announced in 2000, originally as a multi-platform title for the PlayStation, the Dreamcast, and Windows. Production was moved to the Xbox in 2001 to take advantage of its more powerful hardware. The Collective developed the Slayer Engine for use with the game, which was later used for several of their subsequent projects. The team sought to create an innovative mix of adventure and free-roaming 3D combat that would appeal to fans and adhere closely to the style of the show. The narrative was written by Christopher Golden and Thomas Sniegoski, who had previously worked on several Buffyverse novels.

Buffy the Vampire Slayer was released in North America on 19 August 2002, and in Europe on 13 September 2002. The game received generally favorable reviews, with praise for its combat and its faithful adaptation of the show. Retrospective reception has remained positive, with critics ranking it as one of the best games based on the franchise. Despite fan interest, it remains exclusive to the Xbox and has not been re-released for newer platforms.

== Gameplay ==
Buffy engaging in combat with a vampire. Certain enemies, including vampires, must be defeated by piercing their heart with a wooden stake.

Buffy the Vampire Slayer is an action-adventure beat 'em up game presented from a third-person perspective. Players control Buffy Summers, a Slayer who is tasked with fighting vampires and other supernatural creatures across Sunnydale, California. The game is divided into 13 levels; in each, Buffy must travel through a location in Sunnydale, clear it of enemies while platforming across various obstacles, and defeat a boss. Some levels include puzzles that require players to move or destroy objects in order to progress. After completing a level, Buffy returns to the Sunnydale High School Library to regroup with her friends, who can provide upgrades and information. The game utilizes a checkpoint system; if Buffy is defeated, the player must restart from their most recent checkpoint.

In combat, Buffy can attack enemies with martial arts moves such as punches, kicks, and throws, which can be performed consecutively to create combos. Players can lock on and target specific enemies, as well as perform moves that can hit multiple enemies at once. Buffy can attack with various melee weapons found in each area, such as baseball bats, rakes, or shovels. Weapons degrade with each use, causing them to break into smaller versions and eventually shatter. In certain areas, Buffy can also use projectile-based weapons such as crossbows or a holy water gun to attack enemies from a distance. The player can also store a limited number of weapons for later use, and obtain new weapons from Xander at the library.

Weaker enemies such as zombies and demons may be defeated with simple physical attacks, but stronger enemies such as vampires must be defeated by exploiting a weakness, such as piercing their heart with a stake or luring them into sunlight. Vampires also regain health when they are not being attacked. Players can interact with the environment during combat encounters; for example, Buffy can impale vampires on a wooden fence post to instantly defeat them. She can also throw enemies into hazards such as fires or oncoming trains, or destroy wooden tables and crates to quickly obtain improvised stakes.

Buffy also has access to Slayer Power, an energy gauge that can be used to strengthen standard physical attacks or perform special Slayer moves by inputting specific button combinations. Buffy regains health and Slayer Power upon defeating an enemy. Additional Slayer moves are unlocked by progressing through the game and speaking with Giles at the library. Each move is introduced with an on-screen tutorial that teaches players how to perform it. Buffy can also collect hidden energy crystals in each level, which Willow can use to increase the size of Buffy's Slayer Power and health gauges.

== Synopsis ==
=== Characters ===
Buffy the Vampire Slayer is set during the third season of the TV series, and features numerous characters from the show. Series protagonist Buffy Summers is the game's sole playable character. Her allies, known as the "Scooby Gang", include her Watcher Rupert Giles and her friends Xander Harris, Willow Rosenberg, Cordelia Chase, and Angel, who assist Buffy in her battles and provide other support throughout the events of the game.

The majority of the cast from the TV series reprise their roles as their respective characters' voice actors, with the exception of Sarah Michelle Gellar, who did not return as Buffy. Instead, she is voiced by Giselle Loren.

Major villains include the ancient being Laibach the Old One, the shapeshifting vampires Malik and Scylla, the necromancer Matereani, and the Dreamers, a trio of reality-bending demons named Urd, Skuld and Verdandi. The Master also plays a major role, having been resurrected in a phantom form following his defeat in the first season of the TV series. Anti-hero vampire Spike and his girlfriend Drusilla also make appearances.

=== Plot ===
In a dream sequence, Giles takes Buffy to an old Spanish mission for training. Buffy fights her way to the chapel, where she is transported to the Sunken Church. There, she encounters three demons and the Master, who attacks her before she awakens from the nightmare. The next evening, Buffy is practicing cheerleading when vampires invade the school. She rushes to the library to save Giles from a vampire named Malik, who escapes with a book on spirit channeling. It is revealed that Malik is working for Spike, who uses the book to summon the spirit of an ancient being named Laibach the Old One. Laibach possesses Drusilla in order to force Spike to do its bidding, orders Spike to get fresh human sacrifices for a coming ceremony, and dispatches vampires to the Bronze.

Buffy and her friends head to the Bronze, where a group of vampires led by Scylla break in and kidnap several students, including Willow. Buffy pursues Scylla, defeating her and rescuing Willow, but realizes that Spike has taken over the Sunken Church. Buffy battles her way to the church, where the powerful necromancer Matereani is performing a ritual. Although Buffy kills Matereani, she is unable to stop him from completing the ritual. To Buffy's shock, the Master is resurrected as a phantom. Giles explains that while the Master couldn't be resurrected in physical form, a skilled necromancer could bring him back as a phantom. Buffy gives Giles the sigil the demons from her dream wore, hoping that it is a clue.

Buffy heads to Angel's mansion to meet with him, but he is abducted by demons. Buffy fights through the mansion and reaches Angel's training room, where she battles Scylla once more. Buffy kills Scylla by exposing her to sunlight, but the Master possesses Angel, forcing Buffy to flee. She regroups with her friends, and learns from Xander that the vampires are expecting a shipment at the docks, while Giles tells her that the sigil from her dream represents three demons known as the Dreamers. Buffy heads to the docks, where she finds that the shipment is one of the Dreamers, which she kills. The Master decides to forge a Deglon Sphere that will amplify the remaining Dreamers' powers. He sends his men to capture a local foundry, and Malik and Spike to stop Buffy. As Buffy heads out to locate the Master, demons and vampires attack the school again. She battles through the school and faces Malik again, but Spike intervenes, killing him and saving Buffy. Spike explains that Laibach plans to build a bridge from his demon dimension to Earth in order to lead an army of demons to take over the world, for which he needs the aid of the Dreamers and the Master. However, Spike opposes the plan and is only cooperating because Laibach is possessing Drusilla. Spike offers to ally with Buffy's group and lead them to the Master and Angel if they help save Drusilla, which they reluctantly accept.

At the foundry, Buffy battles her way to the Master while her friends and Spike locate Drusilla. Buffy fights the Master and defeats him, but is unable to kill him without harming Angel. Willow exorcises the Master from Angel while Xander and Giles exorcise Laibach from Drusilla. Angel reveals that the Master intends to continue his plan using the Deglon Sphere. Spike and Drusilla leave town while Buffy and her friends prepare to assault the Sunken Church. Giles determines that he and the others must perform a spell to return the Master to physical form, as he is too powerful to be destroyed by an exorcism as a phantom.

Buffy reaches the Master at the Sunken Church, but he casts Buffy into a maze in the Dreamers' realm. She finds and kills both of the Dreamers, returning her to the Sunken Church and destroying the Deglon Sphere. Buffy faces off against the Master as her friends' spell takes effect, and finally manages to impale him on a giant stake, killing him once more. Later that night, the group celebrates at the Bronze before Buffy must take off after a vampire.

== Development ==
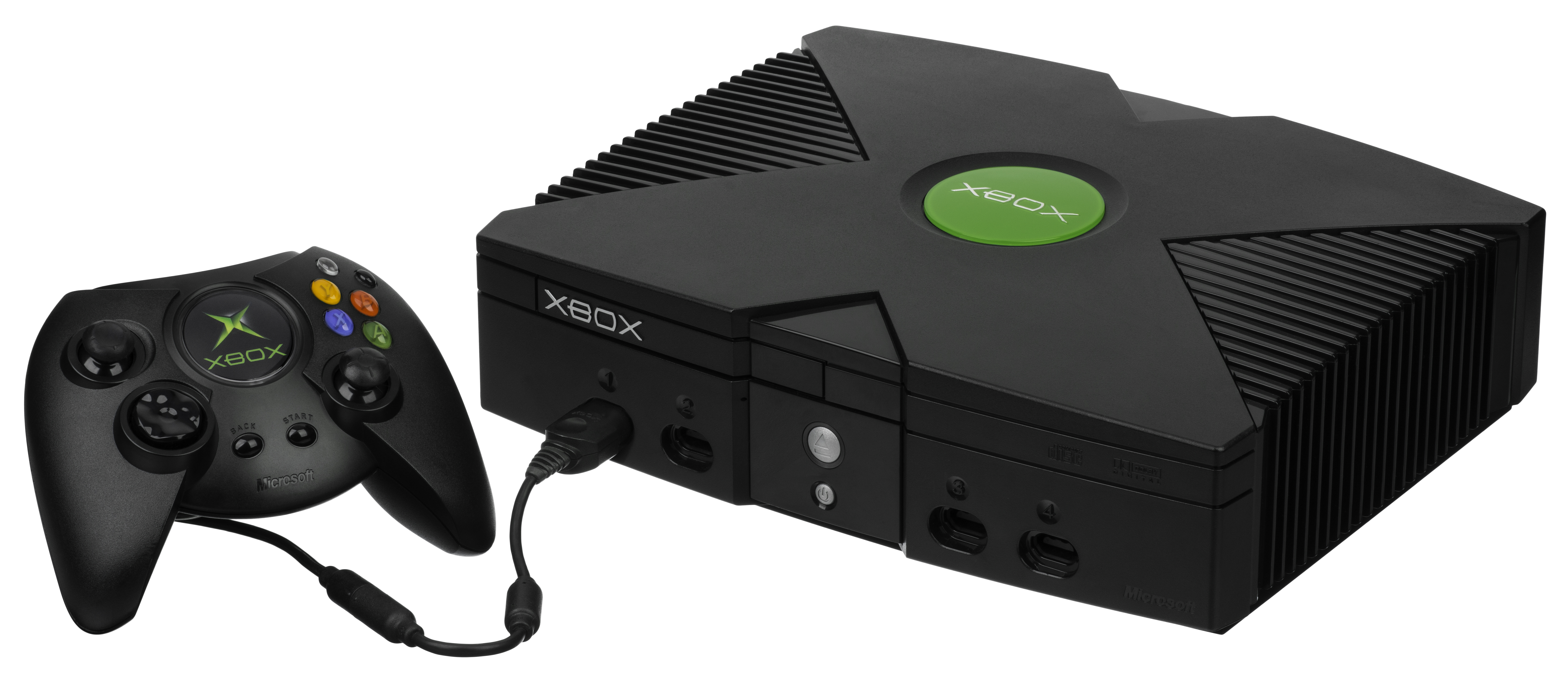
Buffy the Vampire Slayer was released exclusively for the Xbox.

Buffy the Vampire Slayer was developed by The Collective, and production lasted approximately three years. At its peak, the development team consisted of 20 people. The game was announced by Fox Interactive on March 14, 2000, and originally targeted a release in fall of that year for the PlayStation, the Dreamcast, and Microsoft Windows. Screenshots were released in March and September 2000, introducing the combat system and various enemies. An early build of the Windows version of the game was showcased at E3 2001.

As production continued, the developers began to reconsider their multi-platform strategy. The discontinuation of the Dreamcast in March 2001 affected development, with Fox Interactive confirming that the game was still in production, but that the firm was reevaluating whether Buffy the Vampire Slayer would still be published for the system. By mid-2001, it became clear to the team that they needed to move to a next-generation console to fully realize their vision for the game. Development was shifted to the Xbox, with versions for other platforms being scrapped. Assets intended for the Windows version were reworked for use on the Xbox.

=== Design and technical aspects ===
Game designer Tony Barnes described the game as an "action combat adventure" that was inspired by the show's focus on action and mysteries. The combat was designed to closely mirror the martial arts fighting style seen on the show. Designer James Goddard explained that the team took inspiration from other fighting games, including the Tekken and Dead or Alive series and Street Fighter II, and incorporated free-roaming targeting and environmental gameplay. Goddard emphasized ease of control and accuracy to the show when implementing moves, and designed the control scheme to be intuitive even for players who were not skilled with traditional fighting games.

To help produce the game's animations, Fox Interactive hired Jeff Pruitt and Sophia Crawford, who had worked as stunt doubles on the TV series. Pruitt and Crawford performed various combat moves from the show, which the animation team digitized via motion capture and then further modified by hand to implement into the game as actions for Buffy and various non-player characters. Goddard said Pruitt and Crawford's involvement and the reference motion capture were "crucial" to the animation process and motion design for the game.

The Collective created a proprietary game engine, which they named the Slayer Engine, for use with the game. Programmer Nathan Hunt described it as a "very powerful crossplatform engine that is tweaked to take advantage of whichever platform it's running on". Hunt explained that the game was designed to take advantage of the Xbox hardware by making extensive use of its support for programmable vertex shaders, as well as using its ample RAM to store advanced texture and lighting data. The Collective went on to use the Slayer Engine for several of their future projects, beginning with Indiana Jones and the Emperor's Tomb (2003).

=== Writing and art ===
The narrative and dialogue of Buffy the Vampire Slayer were written by Christopher Golden and Thomas Sniegoski, who had previously worked on several Buffyverse novels. The writers decided to set the game's narrative in the third season of the TV series; creative director Richard Hare explained that they felt this period was an "important chapter in Buffy's history", and that having the game take place in past continuity would minimize potential conflicts with future television storylines. Artist Kye-wan Sung collected sketches from other team members to design original enemies that would fit into the world of the series, which were then used as a base to create texture-mapped 3D models for use in the game.

=== Release ===
Buffy the Vampire Slayer was delayed several times from its originally announced release date of fall 2000. Electronic Arts displayed an early build of the Xbox version of the game at ECTS 2001, where a targeted release date of March 2002 was announced. Closer to release, EA and Fox Interactive displayed the game at E3 2002, marketing it as "a lost episode from the TV series' third season". On August 7, 2002, EA announced the game had gone gold, and it was released in North America on August 19, and in PAL regions on September 13. The game was made backwards compatible with the Xbox 360 in December 2006.

== Reception ==
=== Contemporary ===
Reception

Aggregate score
Aggregator	Score
Metacritic	79/100

Review scores
Publication	Score
AllGame	3.5/5
Electronic Gaming Monthly	6/10
Eurogamer	8/10
Game Informer	9/10
GamePro	3.5/5
GameSpot	8.3/10
GameSpy	4/5
GameZone	8.8/10
IGN	8.2/10
Official Xbox Magazine (US)	9/10
The Cincinnati Enquirer	4/5
Entertainment Weekly	B

Buffy the Vampire Slayer received "generally favorable" reviews, according to the review aggregator website Metacritic.

Critics agreed that the game was a successful adaptation of the show that would satisfy fans, and that it was also enjoyable for players who were unfamiliar with the franchise. (Note: Supported by multiple sources:) Marc Saltzman of The Cincinnati Enquirer wrote that "video games based on TV franchises don't always live up to the shows that inspired them. Fortunately, Buffy the Vampire Slayer is an exception." Reviewers enjoyed that most of the cast of the show reprised their roles, and although several lamented the absence of Sarah Michelle Gellar, praise was directed to Giselle Loren's performance as Buffy. (Note: Supported by multiple sources:) The story was positively received, with numerous critics writing that it was faithful to the style of the show. (Note: Supported by multiple sources:)

The game's combat was acclaimed, with reviewers finding it dynamic and engaging. (Note: Supported by multiple sources:) Hilary Goldstein of IGN called the fighting system "fantastic" and praised the vampire battles, while Kristian Brogger of Game Informer said the game was "a treatise on how to make a high-octane button masher". Scott Alan Marriott of AllGame said the combat was "thoroughly enjoyable" and praised the wide variety of moves and attacks available to players. The controls received positive comments, with critics finding them smooth and easy to use.

Critics generally praised the game's graphics. Ryan Boyce of Maxim called the visuals "eye-popping", and Zach Meston of GameSpy praised the game's lighting and background detail. The character models were lauded, with reviewers praising their detail and accuracy to the series' cast members. (Note: Supported by multiple sources:) Conversely, Tom Bramwell of Eurogamer felt that the visuals were too dark, "washed out and PC-like".

Several critics opined that the game was one of the best titles available on the Xbox at the time of release, with some calling it the best beat-em-up for the system. (Note: Supported by multiple sources:) GameSpot named the game the runner-up for its August 2002 "Xbox Game of the Month" award.

The game's camera was the subject of criticism. Bramwell said the camera "is not very helpful at all and often causes problems", and others found it to be unreliable during platforming and combat. (Note: Supported by multiple sources:) The platforming sequences were criticized; several reviewers disliked Buffy's inability to swim and faulted the lack of checkpoints. (Note: Supported by multiple sources:) Critics also found the dialogue and voice clips to be repetitive. (Note: Supported by multiple sources:)

=== Retrospective ===
Retrospective reviews of Buffy the Vampire Slayer have been positive, and critics have lamented that the game has remained exclusive to the Xbox. In 2017, Brittany Vincent of Syfy Wire ranked it as the second best Buffy game, calling it "an interesting adventure for Buffy fans". In 2021, Neil Bolt of Bloody Disgusting wrote that the game "did a lot right in recreating what made the show so memorable for so many". In a 2023 roundup review of licensed games, Matthew Byrd of Den of Geek said that it was unfortunate that the game had a small audience upon release, deeming it "one of the Xbox’s better action/adventure titles and certainly one of its best overall early games". Writing for Tom's Guide, Marshall Honorof praised the game's "rock-solid combat and platforming" and expressed a desire for it to be re-released for the Xbox Series X/S consoles.

According to GameSpot, the game was commercially unsuccessful. It won the publication's annual "Best Game No One Played on Xbox" award in 2002, and was nominated in the "Best Action Adventure Game on Xbox" category.

Buffy the Vampire Slayer has also attracted scholarly attention. In a 2005 article, video game scholar Tanya Krzywinska evaluated the game's representation of gender, writing that it "challenged and subverted" the "traditionally macho-coded qualities of fight-based games", and noting that Buffy's role as a female protagonist with supernatural powers offered empowerment and agency to both male and female players.
