= Helen Horton =

American actress (1923–2007)

- Born: Helen Virginia Horton; November 21, 1923; Chicago, Illinois, U.S.
- Died: September 28, 2007 (aged 83); Topanga, California, U.S.
- Occupation: Actress
- Years active: 1953–1990
- Spouse: James Hamish Thomson
- Children: 3
- Relatives: Lily James (granddaughter)

Helen Virginia Horton (November 21, 1923 – September 28, 2007) was an American actress. She was born in Chicago and had a brief career in New York City. She married and lived near London. She worked extensively in British television, radio and theatre, and had three children. Horton voiced the ship's computer, "Mother", in the 1979 film Alien.

== Early life ==
Horton attended Northwestern University where she became lifelong friends with Patricia Neal. She was well thought of in the drama department and was cast as Viola, the lead role in Twelfth Night, with Neal cast as Olivia, in a university production of the Shakespeare play.

In September 1945, Horton and Neal took a shared apartment in New York and looked for work. They both got parts in a production of Seven Mirrors at the Blackfriars Theatre.

== Career ==
Horton took over from Vivien Leigh as Blanche in A Streetcar Named Desire after the play's London run was completed and it began to tour the United Kingdom. When Neal mentioned the connection to Leigh, she remarked "No one takes over for me, dear. When I leave a play, it's over."

=== Filmography ===
- Sie fanden eine Heimat (1953) – Miss Sullivan
- Strange Stories (1953) – Marie
- Sunday Night Theatre (1953–1959, BBC series, 5 episodes) – Ann Wesfield / Dorothy Stafford / Kendall Frayne / Lily Miller / Estelle Quinn
- The Battle of the River Plate (1956) – (uncredited)
- Let's Be Happy (1957, musical film) – Sadie Whitelaw
- The Mark of the Hawk (1957, drama film also known as The Accused) – Barbara Craig
- Never Take Sweets from a Stranger (1960) – Sylvia Kingsley
- Play of the Week (1959–1967, ITV series, 5 episodes) – Mollie / Mona / Mrs. Barker / Mrs. Storch / Sonia Chance
- The Last Shot You Hear (1969) – Dodie Rubens
- The Chairman (1969) – Susan Wright
- The Dick Emery Show (1971–1981, BBC series, 4 episodes)
- Endless Night (1972, crime film) – Aunt Beth
- Phase IV (1974) – Mildred Eldridge
- Two's Company (1975) - Clare
- Nido de viudas (1977) – Ana
- Alien (1979) – Mother (voice)
- Superman III (1983) – Miss Henderson
- The Benny Hill Show, 1979–1986, ITV series 6 episodes
- The Razor's Edge (1984) – Red Cross lady
- Ellis Island (1984, CBC, 3 episodes) – Miss Pringle
- Reunion at Fairborough (1985, TV film)
- Miss Marple (1987, BBC, 1 episode) – Mrs. Cabot
- Bullseye! (1990) – Tourist on Coach
