= Barbara Creed =

Australian academic

- Born: 30 September 1943 (age 83)

Academic background
- Education: Monash University; La Trobe University

Academic work
- Discipline: Cinema studies
- Institutions: University of Melbourne

Barbara Creed FAHA (born 30 September 1943) is an Australian professor of cinema studies in the School of Culture and Communication at the University of Melbourne. She is the author of six books on gender, feminist film theory, and the horror genre. Creed is a graduate of Monash and La Trobe universities where she completed doctoral research using the framework of psychoanalysis and feminist theory to examine horror films. She is known for her cultural criticism.

== Early life ==
Barbara Creed is a well-known Australian commentator on film and media. She is a graduate of Monash and La Trobe University, completing her doctrinal thesis and research on the cinema of horror. Creed pursued the use of feminist theory and psychoanalysis in her examination of horror films. She currently works within the School of Culture and Communication at the University of Melbourne where she is a professor of Cinema Studies. Her current research includes human rights and animal ethics on screen.

Overall, Creed's work is of interest to feminist theory and psychoanalysis and how these theories can be applied to horror films. Her work seriously considers the subjects of feminism, psychoanalysis, and post-culturalism. Her themes of investigation incorporate, horror cinema, depictions of sex, and feminism. Creed's work relies on a number of theorists including Sigmund Freud, and Julia Kristeva.

Julia Kristeva is one of Creed's major feminist influencers, as she studied Kristeva in great depth, particularly with her examination of the abject. Creed wrote an essay on Kristeva and film in 1985 for the British Film Journal. Creed's The Monstrous-Feminine was published in 1993 and clearly draws inspiration from her earlier work on Kristeva.

== Key focuses ==
Women in horror films have been consistently represented and portrayed as weak, submissive, and highly sexualized. Creed argues that within horror films, the male gaze is oftentimes the central focus. [Mis]conceptions of female sexuality are inherent within the horror genre, as a common motif is that virtuous or "pure" women survive to the end of the film, and women who exhibit sexual behaviour commonly die early into the narrative. This exemplifies how sexually active women are harlots, who warrant their own death, wherein only the "pure" women deserve to live. On the other hand, women depicted as villains are portrayed as innately evil, and their monstrosity is connected to their reproductive bodily functions.

=== Kristeva's Abjection ===
Creed further acknowledges the influence of Julia Kristeva, by examining the notion of abjection. According to Kristeva, abjection is the failure to distinguish what constitutes as "self", and what is "other". It is a breakdown of borders between human existence and non-existence. Creed argues that abjection theory is profoundly engrained within the horror genre. She explains this by focuses on how horror emphasizes boundaries of humanity and beyond. Within horror films this theory of a border and the breaking of rules and norms is important as it relates to the formation of the monstrous, which suggests that anything that navigates or exists across this "border" is abject. Kristeva's theory therefore can be applied to the monstrous feminine, particularly the themes of the mother-child relationship and the mother's womb, which both relate to the ‘archaic mother’.

In her 1987 paper, "From Here to Modernity: Feminism and Postmodernism", Creed's approach to understanding the monstrous male figure also draws on Kristeva's notion of abjection. Creed examples that in examples where the monster is clearly defined as male, its status as male identifies it with a lack, and hence defines it as feminized. In this, "lack" signifies the female, wherein male monsters are identified as abject, lacking; ultimately feminine.

== Work ==
Primarily, Barbara Creed's works focus on the horror genre, and the impact of patriarchal ideologies upon the genre. Creed focuses on Freudian psychoanalysis and Julia Kristeva's work on semiotics. Creed's work using the psychoanalysis framework validates its usefulness in the feminist film theory field.

=== The Monstrous-Feminine ===
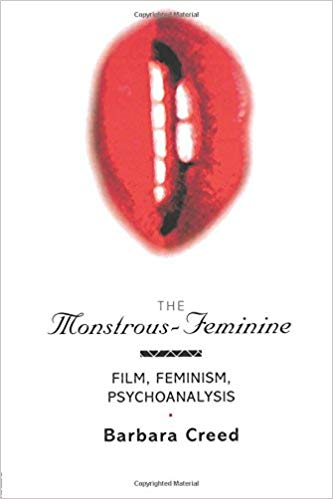

The Monstrous Feminine refers to the interpretation of horror films conceptualizing women, predominantly, as victims. Throughout the book, Creed observes how women are positioned as victims within the horror film genre, and challenges this overriding patriarchal and one-dimensional understanding of women. Creed challenges this masculine viewpoint by arguing that when the feminine is fabricated as monstrous, it is commonly achieved through association with [female] reproductive bodily functions, or through matriarchal traits and tasks. Creed uses the expression "monstrous feminine" because it accentuates the significance of gender in relation to the construction of monstrosity. Creed refrains from using the term "female monster" as it suggests a mere "role reversal of the ‘male monster". Creed argues that the monstrous feminine horrifies her audience through her sexuality, as she is either constructed as a virgin or a whore. She explains that concepts of the monstrous feminine within horror arose from male concerns regarding female sexual difference and castration. Creed asserts that there are a variety of different appearances of the monstrous feminine which all reflect female sexuality: archaic mother, monstrous womb, vampire, possessed monster, witch, and castrating mother.

=== Monstrous-Feminine and the Types of Monsters ===
Barbara Creed's The Monstrous-Feminine: Film, Feminism, Psychoanalysis (1993) investigates the types of monsters that women are portrayed as in horror films, particularly examining archaic mothers, and mythological adaption's of characters. Creed analyses women as monstrous through their roles in horror movies playing witches, vampires, archaic mothers, possessed monsters and mythical creatures, such as Medusa. In her discussion of the many "faces of the monstrous-feminine", she draws on Kristeva's concept of abjection to describe how patriarchal society separates the human from the non-human, and rejects the "partially formed subject".

Creed first considers women as Vampires in such films as Dracula (1992) and The Hunger (1983), wherein she discusses the image of the ‘archaic mother’ with the female vampire being ‘mother’ and her lover or victim as ‘child’ whom she promises eternal life to. Creed also interrogates at the portrayal of desire and lesbianism in the horror film the Hunger (1983), arguing that when the two female vampires kiss there is an eruption of blood in the women's mouths, which represents how lesbian relations are deadly and consequential.

The Monstrous-Feminine also investigates the monstrous figure of witches. Creed critically examines the history of the "witch" from the Middle Ages to the rise of Catholicism. She identifies that early historical definitions of ‘witch’ were associated with healers and users of magic, but during the fourteenth century in the period of witch trials and witch hunts, witchcraft was believed to be a sin and in service to the devil. Barbara Creed examines Carrie and The Exorcist, and critiques the way in which they represent adolescent young women as ‘possessed’ or ‘demonised’ during puberty and menstruation. Creed argues that the use of blood and gore are meant to depict women as demonized or monstrous. Moreover, oftentimes possessed women are on the verge of menstruation and their blood is meant to symbolize or suggest a fear of castration.

Another prominent monstrous figure that Creed discusses in her work is Greek mythology's Medusa and her severed head. Medusa is a mythological creature whose stare can turn people to stone, particularly men, and who has a head covered in snakes, which Creed argues is a deadly symbol of the vagina dentata. The term vagina dentata was coined by Sigmund Freud and follows the myth that female genitalia are monster-like, having teeth. Creed discusses how this creates a fear that women are allegedly actively trying to castrate men. Barbara Creed frequently mentions in her work that horror movies play on this fear of the vagina dentata and even include it visually in films, through enormous toothed monsters or aliens, to settings such as dark and narrow hallways, deadly traps and doors, and spaceships such as that in Alien.

==== Types of Monstrous-Femininity ====
- Archaic mother in Alien (1979).
- Possessed Monster in The Exorcist (1973).
- Monstrous Womb in The Brood (1979).
- Vampire in The Hunger (1983).
- Witch in Carrie (1976).
- Femme Castratrice in I Spit on Your Grave (1978) and Sisters (1973).
- Castrating Mother in Psycho (1960).

=== The Monstrous Womb ===
A woman's reproductive system has long been depicted as abhorrent and intimidating.

Creed places emphasis on this idea of the monstrous-womb, as the maternal body has been considered a source of anxiety to the male gaze. Creed argues that a woman's deep connection to natural events such as reproduction and birth is considered ‘quintessentially grotesque’. Creed reflects back to the Renaissance where the uterus is depicted in connotation with evil and the devil. The reproductive system within horror movies is often depicted as monstrous, for example, the 1979 film Alien clearly depicts this theory. These ideals are clearly imbedded within phallocentric philosophy. Creed's ideology of the woman's reproductive system is similarly analyzed within the works of Kristeva.

=== Freud, Psychoanalysis and Women as Castrator ===
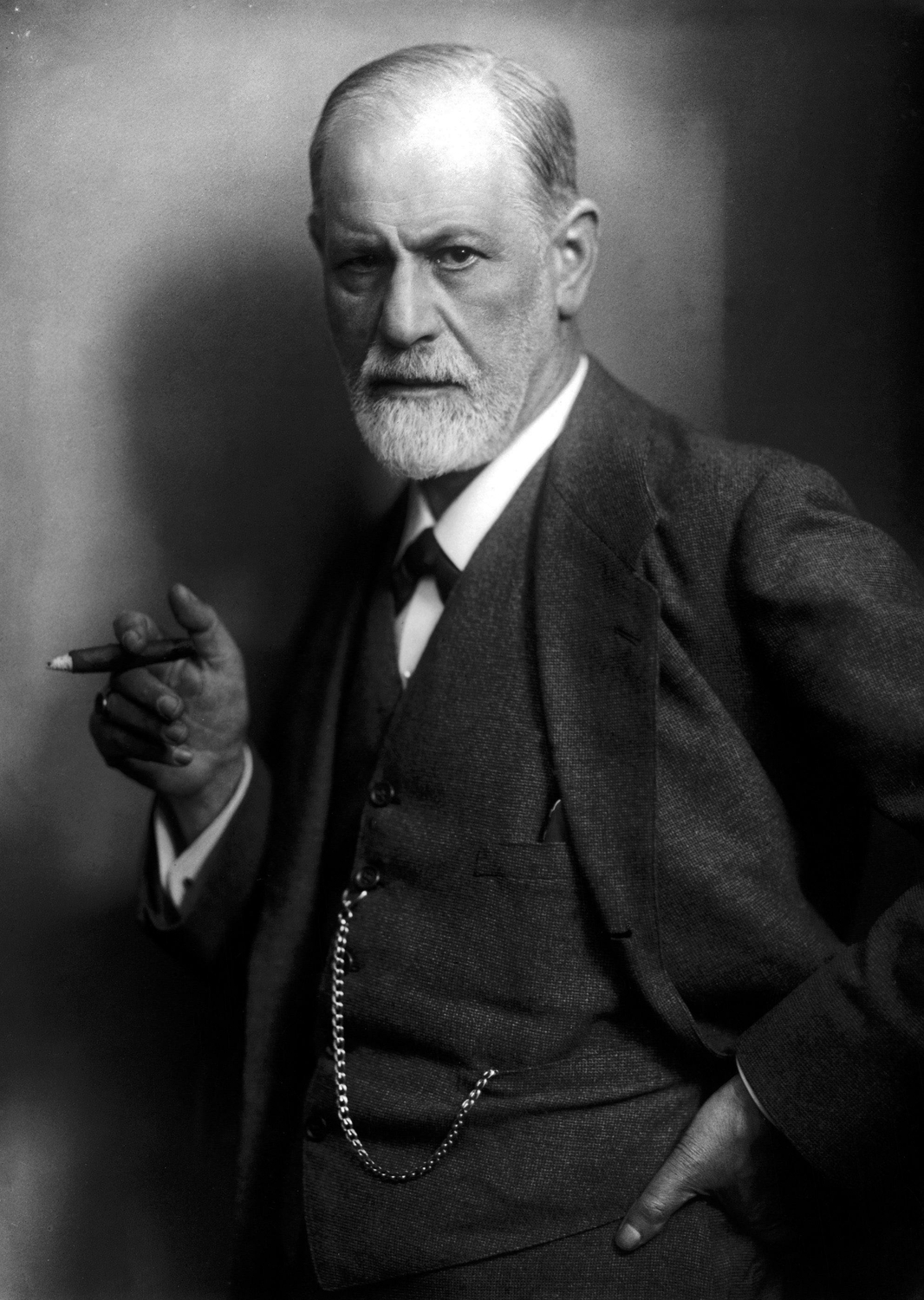
Sigmund Freud

The Monstrous Feminine discusses the psychoanalysis theories of Sigmund Freud, primarily ideas of castration and the female genitalia as monstrous. Creed examines Freud's psychoanalytic theory of sexual difference, and the marking of female sexuality as dangerous, as Freud believed women had vagina dentata and that they were castrators of men. The idea of castration is derived from Freud's concepts of sexual difference, believing that women are substantially different from men, and that all women desire to be a man or masculine-like, suffering from a penis-envy. Sigmund Freud's works on psychoanalysis theorizes that women once had penises, and are themselves castrated, resulting in the formation of female genitalia, and due to this "penis envy", seek to castrate men of their penises to make them as lacking as women. Freud applies this theory to Medusa, as Creed explains that Freud's compares the female genitalia to Medusa as men fear castration from the sight of her.

== Other works ==
=== Media Matrix ===
Barbara Creed's Media Matrix: Sexing the New Reality explores the impact of media and technology on subjects such as the self, identity, sexuality and representation in the public sphere. She includes a definition of "Matrix" in the book's introduction, which she describes as a, "womb; place in which thing is developed", which closely relates to her discussion of the monstrous feminine. In the beginning of this piece, she discusses The Matrix (1999) and Strange Days (1995) in relation to the concept of ‘jacking-in’, that is the use of technology to alter reality and experience life in other people's minds much like virtual reality. Creed argues that the development of technology in the twentieth and twenty-first centuries has allowed people to experiment with reality and time, and disassociate one's self from their own reality, as well as challenge ideas of "fixed personal identity". Media Matrix also examines the role of media and news in the modern era, with a particular interest to how an overwhelming majority of fiction showcases the horrific, evokes fear, and the abject. Creed defines this "crisis TV", wherein news reporters focus on disasters to provoke anxiety and immediacy, and bring the abject into reality.

=== Phallic Panic ===
In Phallic Panic: Film, Horror and the Primal Uncanny, Barbara Creed reflects on the representation of men in the horror genre, with a specific focus on how they are portrayed in comparison to women. This piece offers a feminist analysis on sex difference in the horror genre, as well as the order in which male monsters innate masculinity and is "caught between the opposing forces of culture and nature, the civilized and primitive". Throughout this piece, she makes connections to the notion of the ‘primal uncanny’, which suggests that men as monsters. The ‘primal uncanny’, as Creed looks at, was firstly discussed in Freud's work as just the ‘uncanny’ that linked to ideas of psychoanalysis and castration. Yet, Freud only really considered death and the feeling of horror in relation to male monsters and didn't examine the role of women, nature and animals. Phallic Panic draws on many examples of male monsters from the classic film adaption of Frankenstein and the male werewolf, to vampires and mad scientists, as well as the relationship between ‘beast’ and man.

=== Darwin's Screens ===
In Darwin's Screens: Evolutionary Aesthetics, Time and Sexual Display in the Cinema, Barbara Creed examines the uncanny through Charles Darwin's works regarding sexual selection and origins. Creed uses films that were influenced by Darwin in the nineteenth century to analyze film techniques related to Darwin's works.

== Awards and committees ==
In 2006 Creed was elected a Fellow of the Australian Academy of the Humanities. She is on a variety of worldwide editorial panels.

At the University of Melbourne in 2013, Creed established the Human Rights and Animal Ethics Research Network.

== Publications ==
Barbara Creed has published a multitude of material on gender and horror, including: The Monstrous-Feminine: Film, Feminism. Psychoanalysis (1993), Media Matrix: Sexing the New Reality (2003), Phallic Panic: Film, Horror & the Primal Uncanny (2005) and Darwin's Screens: Evolutionary Aesthetics, Time and Sexual Display in the Cinema (2009).

== See also ==
- Archaic mother
- Vagina dentata
- Sigmund Freud
- Psychoanalysis
- Julia Kristeva
- Feminist film theory
- Gender in horror films

== Bibliography ==
- The Monstrous-Feminine: Film, Feminism, Psychoanalysis (London and New York: Routledge, 1993)
- Media Matrix: Sexing the New Reality (Sydney: Allen & Unwin, 2003)
- Pandora’s Box: Essays in Film Theory, Australian Centre for the Moving Image, (Melbourne: Melbourne University Press, 2004)
- Phallic Panic: Film, Horror and the Primal Uncanny (Melbourne: Melbourne University Press, 2005)
- Darwin's Screens: Evolutionary Aesthetics, Time and Sexual Display in the Cinema (Melbourne: Melbourne University Press, 2009)

== Filmography ==
- Homosexuality – a Film for Discussion (1975)
