= Cult Movies 3 =

Book by Danny Peary (1988)

- Author: Danny Peary
- Language: English
- Subject: Cult films
- Publisher: Delta Books
- Publication date: 1988
- Publication place: United States
- Media type: Print
- Preceded by: Cult Movies 2

Cult Movies 3 is a 1988 book by Danny Peary, a follow-up to his previous books Cult Movies (1980) and Cult Movies 2 (1983). Like its predecessors, it consists of a series of essays regarding what Peary described as the most representative examples of the cult film phenomenon. The book covers fifty films that were not discussed in the first two volumes.

== Content ==
The films are presented in alphabetical order, with each chapter featuring a story synopsis for the covered title, Peary's response to the film, production and release details, and a brief selection of contemporary critical reviews. The book features a guest contribution by Henry Blinder, who wrote the essay on Seconds.

== Publication history ==
Certain chapters from Cult Movies 3 were republished in 2014 as a thematically connected e-book, bringing together essays about cult movies from certain genres.

== Films ==
- An American Werewolf in London (1981)
- Annie Hall (1977)
- The Black Cat (1934)
- Blade Runner (1982)
- Blue Velvet (1986)
- Body Heat (1981)
- The Cabinet of Dr. Caligari (1919)
- Café Flesh (1982)
- Chilly Scenes of Winter (1979)
- Choose Me (1984)
- Diva (1981)
- Dr. Strangelove or: How I Learned to Stop Worrying and Love the Bomb (1964)
- Easy Rider (1969)
- Faster, Pussycat! Kill! Kill! (1965)
- Five Million Years to Earth (1967, a.k.a. Quatermass and the Pit)
- Gentlemen Prefer Blondes (1953)
- Glen or Glenda (1953)
- The Gods Must Be Crazy (1980)
- Imitation of Life (1959)
- In a Lonely Place (1950)
- It's a Mad, Mad, Mad, Mad World (1963)
- Liquid Sky (1982)
- Martin (1978)
- Miracle on 34th Street (1947)
- Monsieur Verdoux (1947)
- The Naked Kiss (1964)
- Napoléon (1927)
- New York, New York (1977)
- The Night of the Hunter (1955)
- Now, Voyager (1942)
- Los Olvidados (1950, a.k.a. The Young and the Damned)
- On Her Majesty's Secret Service (1969)
- One-Eyed Jacks (1961)
- Over the Edge (1979)
- Psycho (1960)
- The Quiet Man (1952)
- Ride the High Country (1962)
- The Road Warrior (1981, a.k.a. Mad Max 2)
- Seconds (1966)
- Sons of the Desert (1933)
- A Star Is Born (1954)
- The Stunt Man (1980)
- The Terminator (1984)
- That Hamilton Woman (1941)
- The Thief of Bagdad (1940)
- The Thing from Another World (1951)
- Touch of Evil (1958)
- Walkabout (1971)
- The Wanderers (1979)
- Where the Boys Are (1960)
