= Star Trek: Deep Space Nine: The Fallen =

2000 video game

- Developer: The Collective
- Publisher: Simon & Schuster
- Engine: Unreal Engine 1
- Platforms: Microsoft Windows, Mac OS
- Release: Windows: NA: November 13, 2000; EU: November 17, 2000; Mac: WW: August 1, 2001
- Genre: Third-person shooter
- Mode: Single-player

Star Trek: Deep Space Nine: The Fallen is a 2000 third-person shooter video game developed by The Collective and published by Simon & Schuster. The game is loosely based on a trilogy of novels by Judith and Garfield Reeves-Stevens called Millennium: The Fall of Terok Nor, The War of the Prophets and Inferno. The setting is the Deep Space Nine space station featured in the American science fiction television series Star Trek: Deep Space Nine.

== Gameplay ==
Worf fights a Jem'Hadar soldier with an energy weapon

The player can choose to play through the entire game as either Captain Benjamin Sisko, Major Kira Nerys or Lt. Commander Worf. The game does not repeat levels, however; different characters must complete different levels. As such, depending on which character the player chooses, the game is very different, and the entire story is only revealed when the player completes the game as all three characters.

A major factor in the gameplay is the tricorder, which can be used to scan for nearby lifesigns, hidden ammo and energy signals. The tricorder is also used in combat when fighting enemies with personal shields. The tricorder must be used to scan the shield frequency, at which point the phaser is automatically adjusted to that frequency, allowing the player to damage the enemy. Another classic Star Trek device which is included in the game is the comm badge, which allows the player to contact NPCs for clues on what to do next and gameplay hints.

== Story ==
=== Background ===
The Bajorans believe the alien species that reside in the wormhole near their planet are Prophets, worshipping them as gods and referring to the wormhole as the "Celestial Temple". Bajoran legend tells that millennia ago, the Prophets expelled another race from the wormhole, the Pah-wraiths, imprisoning them forever in the Fire Caves on Bajor. However, legend tells of three red Orbs which are said to hold the key to the Pah-wraiths' resurrection and return to the Temple, although none of these Orbs have ever been located. Or so it is thought.

=== Plot ===
The game begins with a cutscene set during the final days of the Cardassian occupation of Bajor. A Cardassian scientist called Terrell (voiced by Nancy Linari) has discovered one of the red Orbs and is studying it in a secret research facility on Terok Nor, a space station orbiting Bajor, with the intention of harnessing its power as a weapon for the Cardassian Union. However, there is an accident and her Cardassian guards are killed. Soon thereafter, the Cardassians seal the room and abandon the station, handing it over to the Federation.

Six years later, the USS Defiant receives a distress call from a Bajoran science vessel which has been recently attacked, although there are no ships in the vicinity. Cpt. Sisko (Kevin Michael Richardson) takes a shuttle to investigate and tag the survivors with transport enhancers. However, whilst he is still on board, a Grigari (a mysterious mercenary race from the fringes of the Beta Quadrant) warship de-cloaks and attacks the Defiant. On board, Lt. Cmd. Worf (Michael Dorn) must work to restore impulse power to the ship while fighting Grigari boarding parties. Eventually, Worf completes his repairs, Sisko rescues the survivors, and the Defiant returns to Deep Space Nine (the former Terok Nor).

Meanwhile, Major Kira Nerys (Nana Visitor) is meeting an old friend of hers from the days of the Bajoran Resistance movement, Obanak Keelen (Michael Bell). Kira is shocked to learn that Obanak has become the leader of a sect known as the Cult of the Pah-wraiths, a heretical group who believe the Pah-wraiths to be the "True Prophets" of Bajor. Obanak asks Kira to put pressure on the Vedek Assembly (Bajor's religious leaders) to allow the Cult to explore an ancient temple on the moon Jeraddo. However, the monastery in which she is meeting him is attacked by soldiers acting on the orders of the Assembly. Kira manages to get Keelen to her runabout, and they head back to Deep Space Nine.

At the station, the bodies of the Cardassians killed during Terrell's experiment are discovered fused to the hull of the station. Constable Odo (René Auberjonois) begins an investigation as Sisko, Kira and Worf head to Jeraddo. Once there, the trio discover a mural at the temple. Returning to the station, they have the mural analyzed and find that it depicts the three Orbs of the Pah-wraiths and the wormhole, but offers no solid information. Word then arrives from Cardassia that Provost Dejar of the Carnellian Circle is on her way to investigate the dead bodies, who are believed to have been members of Gul Dukat's elite personal guard. It is concluded that the bodies were not fused to the hull by a transporter accident as was initially thought, but by some kind of spatial distortion. At this point, the sealed Cardassian laboratory is discovered, with the Orb still in stasis inside. Sisko takes Dejar to the lab, but soon learns that Dejar is in fact an Obsidian Order operative, Prefect Terrell. She steals the Orb and escapes with it.

Upon further analysis, it is discovered that the red Orbs are capable of forming a second artificial wormhole, and it is theorized that Terrell is attempting to use the Orbs to create a weapon that could form ruptures in transient subspace. In order to ensure this doesn't happen, Starfleet authorizes the acquisition of another red Orb so they can battle Terrell should she successfully create such a weapon. Sisko learns that one of the Orbs is on board the USS Ulysses which crashed on S-R III several years previously. Worf and Sisko recover the Orb but are captured by the Dominion and sent to a concentration camp. The Defiant is also boarded and captured. However, Sisko, Worf and Kira escape and recapture the Defiant, returning to Deep Space Nine with the Orb.

In order to capture the Orb in Terrell's possession, Kira is disguised as a Cardassian scientist, Alira Rejal, and sent to the Cardassian military research base on Hass'Terral. She infiltrates the facility and sneaks Sisko and Worf into the base. They confront Terrell, but no sooner have they done so when Obanak beams into the base with a squad of Grigari soldiers. Terrell is shot, and Obanak reveals that he was the one who hired the Grigari to help in his plans to free the Pah-wraiths. He is already in possession of one Orb, and he now takes Terrell's Orb, revealing that the Grigari are attacking Deep Space Nine as they speak to take possession of the third Orb. Before she dies, Terrell reveals the only way the Orbs can be destroyed is by a using a focused graviton beam.

Sisko, Kira and Worf head back to Deep Space Nine to find it under attack from a fleet of Grigari warships, who are in the process of boarding the station. They split up and fight their way to the laboratory, but arrive only in time to see Obanak commence the summoning ritual with his followers. He then becomes possessed by a Pah-wraith and, with his newly acquired power, he attacks the trio. However, they defeat him, sealing him within the proto-wormhole and thus sealing the wormhole itself.

The game ends with a cutscene in which Kira expresses great sadness over the loss of her friend, a once good man, and is concerned about what could happen if someone truly evil were ever able to harness the power of the Pah-wraiths.

== Development ==
It took 22 months to complete the game.

== Reception ==
Reception

Aggregate score
Aggregator	Score
Metacritic	81/100

Review scores
Publication	Score
AllGame	4/5
Computer Games Magazine	4/5
Computer Gaming World	4/5
Edge	6/10
Eurogamer	9/10
Gamekult	6/10
GameRevolution	B+
GameSpot	7.7/10
GameSpy	82%
GameZone	7.5/10
IGN	7.8/10
Jeuxvideo.com	17/20
PC Gamer (US)	72%
TheGamer	81/100

Star Trek: Deep Space Nine: The Fallen received "favorable" reviews according to the review aggregation website Metacritic.

Eurogamer's Keith Ellis was very impressed, praising the use of the Unreal Engine, and lauding the game for "having you genuinely scared and creeping around everywhere like some sort of wussy!" Ellis praised the non-combat levels, which allow the player to walk around Deep Space Nine and the Defiant. Although he said that a multiplayer option would have been welcome, he concluded: "Playing through the game once is a pleasure in itself, but having the added bonus of two more characters to complete the game with gives astounding value for money. A solid storyline backed by hauntingly good graphics and sound, with entertaining combat and weaponry make this a hard game to put down."

Game Revolution praised the implementation of the Unreal Engine and the ability to play as three different characters over the course of three different sets of levels, concluding that "the Star Trek series has created another above-average game. If you're a DS9 fan, this is a good one. Heck - even if you're new to the series, the game can be entertaining." GameSpy's Lee Haumersen praised the graphics but criticized the gameplay, calling it "A strong story under a technically solid game that suffers from weak implementation."

IGN's Gil Alexander Shif, too, was impressed with the graphics, voice acting, sound and gameplay. However, he was heavily critical of the absence of a multiplayer option, saying "the decision not to include a multiplayer mode in The Fallen has to be one of the worst game-design decisions made this year." He was also critical of the structure of the game, feeling that because the entire story is only revealed when all three characters have been used, there are unnatural gaps in the storytelling during the first two play-throughs. He concluded that "the game is worth seeing, if not owning. Play with moderation (read: take long breaks between missions) and, like a ten-pound holiday turkey, Star Trek Deep Space Nine: The Fallen might last you a good couple of weeks." Although GameSpot's Stephen Poole was disappointed with the lack of multiplayer and somewhat critical of the controls, he concluded: "It could have used more polish in some areas, and it sometimes relies too heavily on very straightforward play elements. But its outstanding production values, good story, engaging environments, and dozens of hours of gameplay prove that its shortcomings can be easily overlooked." GameZone said: "Not a perfect game, but it has enough quality to keep Trek fans very happy. Non-fans wouldn't need to return this if it were a gift, but would find their action needs satisfied better elsewhere."

In 2016, Tom's Guide ranked The Fallen as one of the top ten Star Trek games. In 2020, Screen Rant ranked The Fallen as the eighth best Star Trek game.
