= Cult Movies (book) =

1981 book by Danny Peary

- Author: Danny Peary
- Language: English
- Subject: Cult films
- Publisher: Delta Books
- Publication date: 1981
- Publication place: United States
- Media type: Print
- Pages: 402
- ISBN: 0-440-51647-1
- OCLC: 7577933
- Dewey Decimal: 791.43/75 19
- LC Class: PN1997.8 .P37
- Followed by: Cult Movies 2

Cult Movies is a 1981 book by Danny Peary, consisting of a series of essays regarding what Peary described as the 100 most representative examples of the cult film phenomenon. The films are presented in alphabetical order, with each chapter featuring a story synopsis for the covered title, Peary's response to the film, production and release details, and a brief selection of contemporary critical reviews.

== Criteria ==
In the book's foreword, Peary notes that out of the thousands of movies that have been made, "only an extremely small number have elicited a fiery passion in moviegoers that exists long after their initial releases." Cult movies are defined by Peary as "special films which for one reason or another have been taken to heart by segments of the movie audience, cherished, protected, and most of all, enthusiastically championed." He explains that "the typical Hollywood product" never attains cult status since all viewers perceive these average films in more or less the same way, with no real disagreement as to the film's quality. But cult films "are born in controversy, in arguments over quality, theme, talent and other matters. Cultists believe they are among the blessed few who have discovered something in particular that the average moviegoer and critic have missed – the something that makes the pictures extraordinary."

The book features a guest contribution from Henry Blinder, who provided the essay on the film Two for the Road.

== Publication ==
Cult Movies has been reprinted several times, most recently in 1998 by Gramercy Books (ISBN 0517201852). Two sequels were published, Cult Movies 2 (1983, Dell, ISBN 0-440-51632-3) and Cult Movies 3 (1988, Fireside, ISBN 0-671-64810-1), with each book reviewing fifty additional cult films. Certain chapters from Cult Movies were republished in 2014 as a thematically connected e-book, bringing together essays about cult movies from certain genres.

== Films ==
- Aguirre, the Wrath of God (1972)
- All About Eve (1950)
- Andy Warhol's Bad (1977)
- Badlands (1973)
- Beauty and the Beast (1946)
- Bedtime for Bonzo (1951)
- Behind the Green Door (1972)
- Beyond the Valley of the Dolls (1970)
- Billy Jack (1971)
- Black Sunday (1960)
- The Brood (1979)
- Burn! (1969)
- Caged Heat (1974)
- Casablanca (1941)
- Citizen Kane (1941)
- The Conqueror Worm (1968)
- Dance, Girl, Dance (1940)
- Deep End (1971)
- Detour (1946)
- Duck Soup (1933)
- El Topo (1971)
- Emmanuelle (1974)
- Enter the Dragon (1973)
- Eraserhead (1977)
- Fantasia (1940)
- Forbidden Planet (1956)
- Force of Evil (1948)
- 42nd Street (1933)
- Freaks (1932)
- The Girl Can't Help It (1956)
- Greetings (1968)
- Gun Crazy (1949)
- Halloween (1978)
- A Hard Day's Night (1964)
- The Harder They Come (1973)
- Harold and Maude (1971)
- The Honeymoon Killers (1970)
- House of Wax (1953)
- I Married a Monster from Outer Space (1958)
- I Walked With a Zombie (1943)
- Invasion of the Body Snatchers (1956)
- It's a Gift (1934)
- It's a Wonderful Life (1946)
- Jason and the Argonauts (1963)
- Johnny Guitar (1954)
- The Killing (1956)
- King Kong (1933)
- King of Hearts (1967)
- Kiss Me Deadly (1955)
- La Cage aux Folles (1979)
- Land of the Pharaohs (1955)
- Laura (1944)
- The Little Shop of Horrors (1960)
- Lola Montès (1955)
- The Long Goodbye (1973)
- Mad Max (1979)
- The Maltese Falcon (1941)
- Man of the West (1958)
- Night of the Living Dead (1968)
- The Nutty Professor (1963)
- Once Upon a Time in the West (1968)
- Out of the Past (1947)
- Outrageous! (1977)
- Pandora's Box (1929)
- Peeping Tom (1960)
- Performance (1970)
- Petulia (1968)
- Pink Flamingos (1973)
- Plan 9 from Outer Space (1956)
- Pretty Poison (1968)
- The Producers (1968)
- The Rain People (1969)
- Rebel Without a Cause (1955)
- The Red Shoes (1948)
- Reefer Madness (1936)
- Rio Bravo (1959)
- Rock 'n' Roll High School (1979)
- The Rocky Horror Picture Show (1975)
- The Scarlet Empress (1934)
- The Searchers (1956)
- Shock Corridor (1963)
- The Shooting (1967)
- Singin' in the Rain (1952)
- Sunset Boulevard (1950)
- Sylvia Scarlett (1936)
- The Tall T (1957)
- Targets (1968)
- Tarzan and His Mate (1934)
- The Texas Chain Saw Massacre (1974)
- Top Hat (1935)
- Trash (1970)
- Two for the Road (1967)
- Two-Lane Blacktop (1971)
- 2001: A Space Odyssey (1968)
- Up in Smoke (1978)
- Vertigo (1958)
- The Warriors (1979)
- Where's Poppa? (1970)
- The Wild Bunch (1969)
- The Wizard of Oz (1939)
