= Danny Peary =

American film critic and sports writer (born 1949)

- Born: Dannis Peary; August 8, 1949 (age 77); Philippi, West Virginia, U.S.
- Education: University of Wisconsin–Madison; University of Southern California
- Occupations: Film critic; Sports writer
- Years active: 1971–present
- Known for: Cult Movies; Cult Movies 2; Cult Movies 3

Dannis Peary (born August 8, 1949) is an American film critic and sports writer. He has written and edited many books on cinema and sports-related topics. Peary is most famous for his book Cult Movies (1980), which spawned two sequels, Cult Movies 2 (1983) and Cult Movies 3 (1988) and are all credited for providing more public interest in the cult movie phenomenon.

He is the brother of film critic, columnist, actor, and documentary filmmaker Gerald Peary.

== Early life and education ==
Peary was born in Philippi, West Virginia, to Laura Chaitan and Joseph Y. Peary, a professor. During his childhood, he moved to South Carolina, and then New Jersey. In 1971, he earned a B.A. in history from the University of Wisconsin in Madison. He also worked as a film critic for the Daily Cardinal student newspaper. In 1975, he earned an M.A. in cinema, with honors, at the University of Southern California. While attending USC, he worked as the fine arts and sports editor for L.A. Panorama.

== Personal life ==
Since 1977, Peary has lived in New York City. He and his wife Suzanne have a daughter, Zoe.

== Career ==
=== Film criticism ===
Over the years, his film criticism has been published in FilmInk, Movieline, Satellite Direct, OnDirect TV, TV Guide, Canadian TV Guide, Cosmopolitan, The New York Times, the New York Daily News, The Boston Globe, Sports Collectors Digest, the SoHo News, The Philadelphia Bulletin, Films in Focus, Films and Filming, Slant, L.A. Panorama, Memories and Dreams, The East Hampton Independent, and Country Weekly, as well as The Velvet Light Trap and Newsday, and the Sag Harbor Express. He conducts celebrity interviews for Dan's Papers, in a column called "Danny Peary Talks To..."

=== Cult Movies books ===
In 1981, Peary released his book Cult Movies. He followed it up with Cult Movies 2 in 1983 and Cult Movies 3 in 1989. (See bibliography) These books cover critically ignored (at the time) cult films. Each book contained an essay for each film (100 in the first volume, 50 in the second, and 50 in the third), including production details and information gleaned from Peary's interviews with various producers, directors and actors. Each volume contained an essay by contributor Henry Blinder.

Peary also wrote Guide for the Film Fanatic (1986), reviewing a wider range of films.

Peary's Cult Movies trilogy, along with other touchstones such as Michael Weldon's Psychotronic Video magazine and books, helped establish a foundation for critical analysis of low-budget genre movies. As the Austin Film Society wrote,

There is what we might consider the Danny Peary faction. An excellent writer, Peary lionized a particular kind of “cult" criticism in his multiple volumes of the Cult Movies books. Never dismissive, Peary celebrates these films for their unique qualities and their advocacy of outsider voices. Peary is a fan of the subversive and the humanistic and the books are essential reading for anyone interested in what lies just outside the bounds of the canon.

=== Sportswriting ===
Peary has co-authored books with Major League baseball player-sportscasters Ralph Kiner and Tim McCarver; writer Tom Clavin; Olympic gold medalist and cancer survivor Shannon Miller on her memoir; and Muhammad Ali's daughter Hana Ali on a book about the origins of her father's greatest quotes. He has edited sports books including Baseball Immortal Derek Jeter: A Career in Quotes and Jackie Robinson in Quotes: The Remarkable Life of Baseball's Most Significant Player. (See bibliography)

=== Television career ===
==== Animated series ====
Peary wrote an episode of the 1985-1989 animated series ThunderCats, titled "The Mountain." He wrote an episode of SilverHawks, titled "Undercover", that aired October 28, 1986.

==== Sports-related television ====
Peary was a writer for the nationally syndicated sports-interview TV show The Tim McCarver Show

== Media appearances ==
Peary was interviewed for the 2010 documentary Machete Maidens Unleashed!. The director of the film, Mark Hartley, has said that, "I'd worn my copies of Cult Movies 1, 2 and 3 into the ground from constant re-reading so meeting author Danny Peary was a pleasure." He appears in James Westby's documentary At the Video Store (2019), and in the cult-movie documentary Time Warp (2020).

== Bibliography ==
=== Books ===
- Peary, Danny (1981). Cult movies : the classics, the sleepers, the weird and the wonderful. Dell Publishing. ISBN 0440516471 and 978-0440516477
- — (1983). Cult Movies 2. Dell Publishing. ISBN 978-0-440-51632-3. ISBN 0440516323 and 978-0440516323
- — (1986). Guide for the Film Fanatic. Simon & Schuster. ISBN 0671610813 and 978-0671610814
- — (1989). Cult Movies 3. Fireside Books. ISBN 0671648101 and 978-0671648107
- — (1991). Cult Movie Stars. Simon & Schuster. ISBN 0671749242 and 978-0671749248
- — (1993). Alternate Oscars. Delta. ISBN 0385303327 and 978-0385303323
- — (2004). 1,001 Reasons to Love Baseball. Stewart, Tabori & Chang. ISBN 1584793546 and 9781584793540

Co-author

- with Bruce Chadwick (1989). How to Buy, Trade and Invest in Baseball Cards & Collectibles. Fireside Books. ISBN 067167580X and 978-0671675806
- with Tim McCarver (1998). Tim McCarver's Baseball for Brain Surgeons and other Fans: Understanding and Interpreting the Game So You Can Watch It Like a Pro. Villard Books. ISBN 0375753400 and 978-0375753404
- with Tim McCarver (1999). The Perfect Season: Why 1998 Was Baseball's Greatest Year. Villard Books. ISBN 0375503307 and 978-0375503306
- with Harry Sheehy (2002). Raising a Team Player: Teaching Kids Lasting Values on the Field, on the Court and on the Bench. Storey Publishing. ISBN 1580174477 and 978-1580174473
- with Ralph Kiner (2004). Baseball Forever: Reflections on Sixty Years in the Game. Triumph Books. ISBN 1572435976 and 978-1572435971
- with Tom Clavin (2010). Roger Maris: Baseball's Reluctant Hero. Atria Books. ISBN 1416589287 and 978-1416589280
- with Tom Clavin (2012). Gil Hodges: The Brooklyn Bums, the Miracle Mets and the Extraordinary Life of a Baseball Legend. New American Library. ISBN 9780451235862)
- with Shannon Miller (2015). It's Not About Perfect: Competing for My Country and Fighting for My Life. Thomas Dunne Books. ISBN 1250049865 and 978-1250049865
- with Hana Ali (2018). Ali on Ali: Why He Said What He Said When He Said It. Workman Publishing. ISBN 1523503467 and 978-1523503469

Editor

- Close-Ups: The Movie Star Book (1978)
- Omni's Screen Flights/Screen Fantasies: The Future According to Science Fiction Cinema (1984)
- Cult Baseball Players: The Greats, the Flakes, the Weird and the Wonderful (1990)
- We Played the Game: 65 Players Remember Baseball's Greatest Era, 1947-1964 (1994)
- Super Bowl: The Game of Their Lives (1997)
- — (2015). Baseball Immortal Derek Jeter: A Career in Quotes. Page Street Publishing. ISBN 1624141625 and 978-1624141621
- — (2016). Jackie Robinson in Quotes: The Remarkable Life of Baseball's Most Significant Player. Page Street Publishing. ISBN 1624142443 and 978-1624142444

Co-editor

- The American Animated Cartoon: A Critical Anthology (1980), with Gerald Peary
- Great Golf: 150 Years of Essential Instruction from the Best Players, Teachers, and Writers of All Time (2005), with Allen Richardson
- Tim McCarver's Diamond Gems (2008), with Tim McCarver and Jim Moskovitz
