= Alien 3 (podcast) =

Audio drama

Alien 3 (stylized as Alien III) is an audio drama adaptation of William Gibson's unused 1987 script for the film of the same name. The audio drama was directed by Dirk Maggs and produced by Audible. The show stars Michael Biehn and Lance Henricksen, who reprised their roles as Dwayne Hicks and Bishop respectively.

== Background ==
The show debuted on May 30, 2019. The show was released exclusively on Audible. The show was created for the 40th anniversary of the Alien films.

The show uses a script written by William Gibson in 1987 that was never filmed. The script was previously adapted into a comic book series by Dark Horse Comics. The audio drama was directed by Dirk Maggs. Maggs had previously directed the audiobooks Alien: Out of the Shadows, Alien: River of Pain, and Alien: Sea of Sorrows.

The show was number two in best sellers on Audible in the month following its release.

=== Cast and characters ===
Michael Biehn reprises his role as Hicks. Lance Henricksen reprised his role as Bishop.

- Andrew James Spooner
- Ben Cura
- Cliff Chapman
- Dai Tabuchi
- Dar Dash
- David Seddon
- Graham Hoadly
- Harry Ditson
- Keith Wickham
- Laurel Lefkow
- Lorelei King
- Mairead Doherty
- Martin McDougall
- Michael Biehn
- Michael Roberts
- Rebecca Yeo
- Samantha Coughlan
- Sarah Pitard
- Siri Steinmo
- Tom Alexander

== Plot ==
The story begins after the events of Aliens with Dwayne Hicks, Ellen Ripley, Bishop, and Newt returning from LV-426 in their spaceship the Sulaco. The ship enters territory of the Union of Progressive Peoples and later docks at the space station of Anchorpoint.
