= Walki =

Walki may refer to:

== Places ==
- Walki, Belgaum, Karnataka, India; a village
- Walki, Ahmednagar, Maharashtra, India; a village
- Wałki, Jodłówka-Wałki, Tarnow, Tarnow, Lesser Poland, Poland; a district
- Walki, Tuge, Musawa, Katsina, Nigeria; a village, see List of villages in Katsina State

== Other uses ==
- Walki language, an Australian Aboriginal language

== See also ==
- Walkis Magic Academy, a fictional location in the Japanese comic manga Mashle
- Konfrontacja Sztuk Walki (KSW), a Polish martial art
- Walkey
- Walk (disambiguation)
- Walke (disambiguation)
- Walkie (disambiguation)
