= Walkley (disambiguation) =

Walkley may refer to:

== Places ==
- Walkley, Sheffield, South Yorkshire, England, UK; a suburb
- Walkley (ward), Sheffield, South Yorkshire, England, UK; an electoral ward
- Walkley Road, a major road in Ottawa, Ontario, Canada
- Walkley Line, a bypass rail line operated by CNR in Ottawa, Ontario, Canada

=== Facilities and structures ===
- Walkley Library, Sheffield, South Yorkshire, England, UK; a public lending library
- Walkley station, a transit station in Ottawa, Ontario, Canada
- Walkley Yard, a rail yard operated by CNR in Ottawa, Ontario, Canada

== Other uses ==
- Walkley (surname)
- Walkley Awards, Australian awards for journalism

== See also ==
- Walkley Heights, South Australia, Australia; a suburb of Adelaide
- Walke (disambiguation)
