= Leon Schönker =

Polish painter

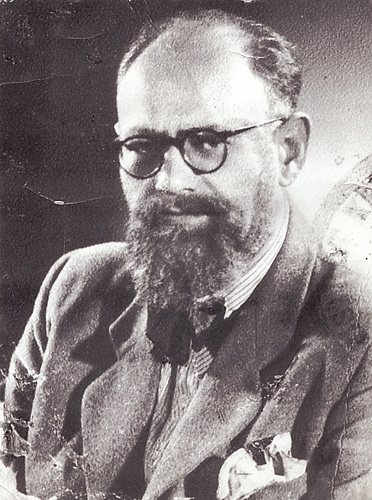
- Born: 1903
- Died: 1965
- Occupation(s): Painter, businessman
- Children: Henryk Schönker

Leon Schönker was a Polish painter, businessman and social activist, born in 1903, died in 1965. Schönker was known for organizing an Emigration Bureau in Oświęcim (renamed Auschwitz by the Nazi occupiers) aiming to help Jews leave occupied Poland and save their lives.

== Biography ==
The Schönker family settled in Oświęcim around the mid-19th century. Subsequent generations of Schönkers contributed greatly to the financial and cultural development of Oświęcim. The family was known for keeping close relationships with local residents, Jews and Christians alike, as well as serving on the city council. Leon's father was Józef Schönker, a well-known industrialist who in 1905 established a pesticide factory called A.E. Schönker – later renamed to Agrochemia Artificial Fertilizer Factory Ltd. He was a member of the town council, the Israelite Religious Community and the Oświęcim Savings Bank.

During World War I, the Schönker family moved to Vienna, where 15-year-old Leon took up his studies at the Academy of Fine Arts. He continued his studies after the war in Paris and Amsterdam. In 1922, he returned to Poland, initially settling in Kraków, where he got involved in local art circles. He was among the founders of the Association of Jewish Painters and Sculptors and was eventually elected its president. His polychromes decorated the interior of the Wolf Popper synagogue in Krakow's Jewish district Kazimierz. He published in a number of dailies and journals, including Nowy Dziennik and Sztuka i Życie Współczesne. In the interwar period, he was already a recognized painter, a well known citizen of Kraków and Oświęcim. His works are in the collections of the Bezalel Academy in Jerusalem and in the Hermitage.

=== Emigration Bureau ===
In 1939 Leon became the president of the Jewish Council of Elders in Oświęcim (renamed Auschwitz by the Germans) taking on responsibility for the fate of the town's Jewish community. During first months of the war he was put in charge of the Bureau for Emigration and was involved in negotiations with German authorities in Berlin. Efforts to relocate Polish Jews were not successful and the German authorities dismissed Schönker, selecting a more compliant president of the Council of Elders in his place. Schönker's attempt to save Jews from Silesia and its subsequent continuation ended in failure, and the vast majority of local Jews, like the rest of their European population, were murdered during the Holocaust. The story of the Emigration Bureau is told in the book written by Henryk Schönker titled The Touch of an Angel.

=== Post 1940 ===
In early 1940 the family was forced to escape from the town. They went through Kraków, Wieliczka and ghettos in Tarnów and Bochnia. Thanks to forged documents they found themselves in the special section of Bergen-Belsen camp as Palestinian citizens waiting to be exchanged. After the evacuation they were liberated. After the liberation the Schönkers returned to their hometown. Leon reopened the Agrochemia factory and took the presidency of the Jewish Religious Association. He became involved in helping survivors and rebuilding Jewish life and the town itself. However, in 1949 the Communists confiscated his factory and imprisoned him as part of the war against private business. In 1955 the family was granted permission to leave the country. They went to Vienna and late to Israel. Leon Schönker died in 1965 at the age of 62.

== See also ==
- Henryk Schönker
- The Touch of an Angel
