= Walkie =

Walkie may refer to:

- Walkie-talkie, a handheld two-way radio
- Walkie (rapper) (1995–2022), Russian hip-hop artist
- Walkie Pi, a character from Street Angels (1996 film)

== See also ==
- Walkey
- Walke (disambiguation)
- Walki (disambiguation)
- Walk (disambiguation)
