= Irena Iłłakowicz =

Polish soldier and intelligence agent (1906–1943)

Irena Morzycka-Iłłakowicz
- Born: 26 July 1906; Berlin, Germany
- Died: 4 October 1943 (aged 37); Warsaw, General Government

Irena Morzycka-Iłłakowicz (also as Iłłakowiczowa, 26 July 1906 – 4 October 1943) was a Polish second lieutenant of the National Armed Forces and intelligence agent. The daughter of Bolesław Morzycki and Władysława Zakrzewska and the sister of Jerzy, she was also a polyglot who spoke seven languages: Polish, French, English, Persian, Finnish, German and Russian.

== Biography ==
Iłłakowicz was born in Berlin. After 1917, when the October Revolution began, she moved with her family to Finland. After returning to the Second Polish Republic (which had regained independence in the aftermath of the First World War), she attended a school led by the Sisters of the Holy Heart of Jesus in Zbylitowska Góra. Afterwards, she studied humanities at Grenoble University in France. In Paris she married Azis Zangenah – son of the prince of Iran. For a period they lived together in a palace in Persia. Irena was a person accustomed to frequent meetings with family and friends. Persia, a long way from home, became arduous for her. After two years, with permission from her husband, she secretly left and went to Teheran. Polish diplomats in Teheran made it possible for her return to Poland. After a period in Poland, she again went to Paris where she met Jerzy Olgierd Iłłakowicz. They married on 23 October 1934 in Warsaw. On 25 June 1936 she bore their only child – daughter Ligia.

In October 1939, after both the German invasion of Poland on 1 September and Soviet invasion of Poland on 17 September, Iłłakowiczowa joined the Polish resistance movement; in particular, she co-operated with Organizacja Wojskowa Związek Jaszczurczy. During the Nazi Occupation of Poland she assumed the name Barbara Zawisza. Irena and her husband Jerzy lived at different addresses in order to avoided being arrested by the Gestapo. She started service as an Intelligence agent in the intelligence unit "Zachód" ("West"). These assignments were to conduct military, economic and information reconnaissance. Department II of Organizacja Wojskowa Związek Jaszczurczy, in agreement with the Department of Związek Walki Zbrojnej – Armia Krajowa, controlled sub-section "Zachód". Speaking German fluently, Iłłakowicz went to Berlin, where the contact point of branch of sub-section "Zachód" was located.

Between 1941 and 1942, her section was destroyed by the Germans. The outcome of this action was the numerous arrests of underground activists. Irena was arrested by the Gestapo on 7 October 1942; they placed her at Pawiak. She underwent harsh interrogations, but revealed nothing. Other colleagues, knowing her role in intelligence, sent her a vial of cyanide, but she did not use it. Her husband arranged for her to be freed from prison. A bribed guard put her in the group of non-political prisoners to be transported to the Majdanek camp. While there, a group of NSZ fighters from Pomerania freed her from the camp. Dressed in Gestapo uniforms, they came to the camp and presented a falsified document saying that Irena was to be brought to Warsaw for more interrogation. This event was documented in a Delegatura Rządu report.

After a short stay in the Lublin area, Iłłakowicz found herself in Klarysek-Janówek. Later, she came back to Warsaw and stayed with Dr. Miłodroska at Filtrowa Street. She started working on the Soviet intelligence network in Poland. Her husband was to be sent to London as the representative of TNRP (command of the National Armed Forces). He wanted to take her with him, but the command decided against it. Iłłakowicz was to be sent with Tadeusz Salski ("Jan"). Nine days before the trip, on the night of 4 October 1943, Iłłakowicz was summoned to a meeting on an important issue. She was suspicious, but thinking it too important, went to the meeting. She asked Dr. Miłodroska to notify her contact if she did not return.

Iłłakowicz was murdered in unknown circumstances. Jerzy, her husband, started searching for her, and found her body in the infirmary at Oczki Street in Pole Mokotowskie. Irena's murderers remain unknown. In the days before her death, she was involved in intelligence activities against a radio contact point in Otwock, which actively supported Soviet parachutists sent to Poland. Accusations were directed at the NKVD or the PPR.

Iłłakowicz was buried at Powązki under the name of Barbara Zawisza. Because the Gestapo often sent agents to family funerals (and other ceremonies), her husband participated in the ceremony dressed as a gravedigger and her mother as cemetery helper. In 1948, her mother placed a plaque with Iłłakowicz's real name on her grave.

On 20 May 1944, by order of the commander of the National Armed Forces, Iłłakowicz was promoted to second Lieutenant. In 1995, she was posthumously decorated with the Krzyż Narodowego Czynu Zbrojnego (nr 1-95-59).

== Bibliography ==
- Sylwetki kobiet-żołnierzy. Służba Polek na frontach II wojny światowej, część 7 pod redakcją Krystyny Kabzińskiej. Fundacja "Archiwum i Muzeum Pomorskie Armii Krajowej oraz Wojskowej Służby Polek", Toruń 2007. ISBN 83-88693-02-6, p. 138-143.
