= Walkley (surname) =

Walkley is a surname. Notable people with the surname include:

- Arthur Bingham Walkley (1855–1926), English civil servant and drama critic
- Edwin Walkley (1876–1950), Australian cricketer
- Frank Walkley (1921–2009), American state politician
- James Clark Walkley (1817–1890), American state politician
- Laura May Walkley (born 1991), Welsh footballer
- P.T. Walkley, American singer-songwriter
- R. Barrie Walkley (born 1944), American foreign service officer
- Thomas Walkley (fl.1618–1658), English publisher and bookseller
- William Walkley (1896–1976), New Zealand oil company executive

== See also ==
- Walkey (surname)
