= Gmina Tarnów =

Gmina Tarnów Tarnów Commune
- Gmina
- Flag Coat of arms

- Location within Poland
- Coordinates (Tarnów): 50°2′N 21°0′E
- Country: Poland
- Voivodeship: Lesser Poland
- County: Tarnów County
- Seat: Tarnów

Area
  - Total: 82.81 km^{2} (31.97 sq mi)

Population (2006)
  - Total: 23,060
  - Density: 278.5/km^{2} (721.2/sq mi)
- Website: http://www.gmina.tarnow.pl

Gmina Tarnów is a rural gmina (administrative district) in Tarnów County, Lesser Poland Voivodeship, in southern Poland. Its seat is the city of Tarnów, although the city is not part of the territory of the gmina.

The gmina covers an area of 82.81 square kilometres (32.0 sq mi), and as of 2006 its total population is 23,060.

== Villages ==
Gmina Tarnów contains the villages and settlements of Biała, Błonie, Jodłówka-Wałki, Koszyce Małe, Koszyce Wielkie, Łękawka, Nowodworze, Poręba Radlna, Radlna, Tarnowiec, Wola Rzędzińska, Zawada, Zbylitowska Góra and Zgłobice.

== Neighbouring gminas ==
Gmina Tarnów is bordered by the city of Tarnów and by the gminas of Czarna, Lisia Góra, Pleśna, Skrzyszów, Tuchów, Wierzchosławice, Wojnicz and Żabno.
