= Zawada, Tarnów County =

Zawada
- Village
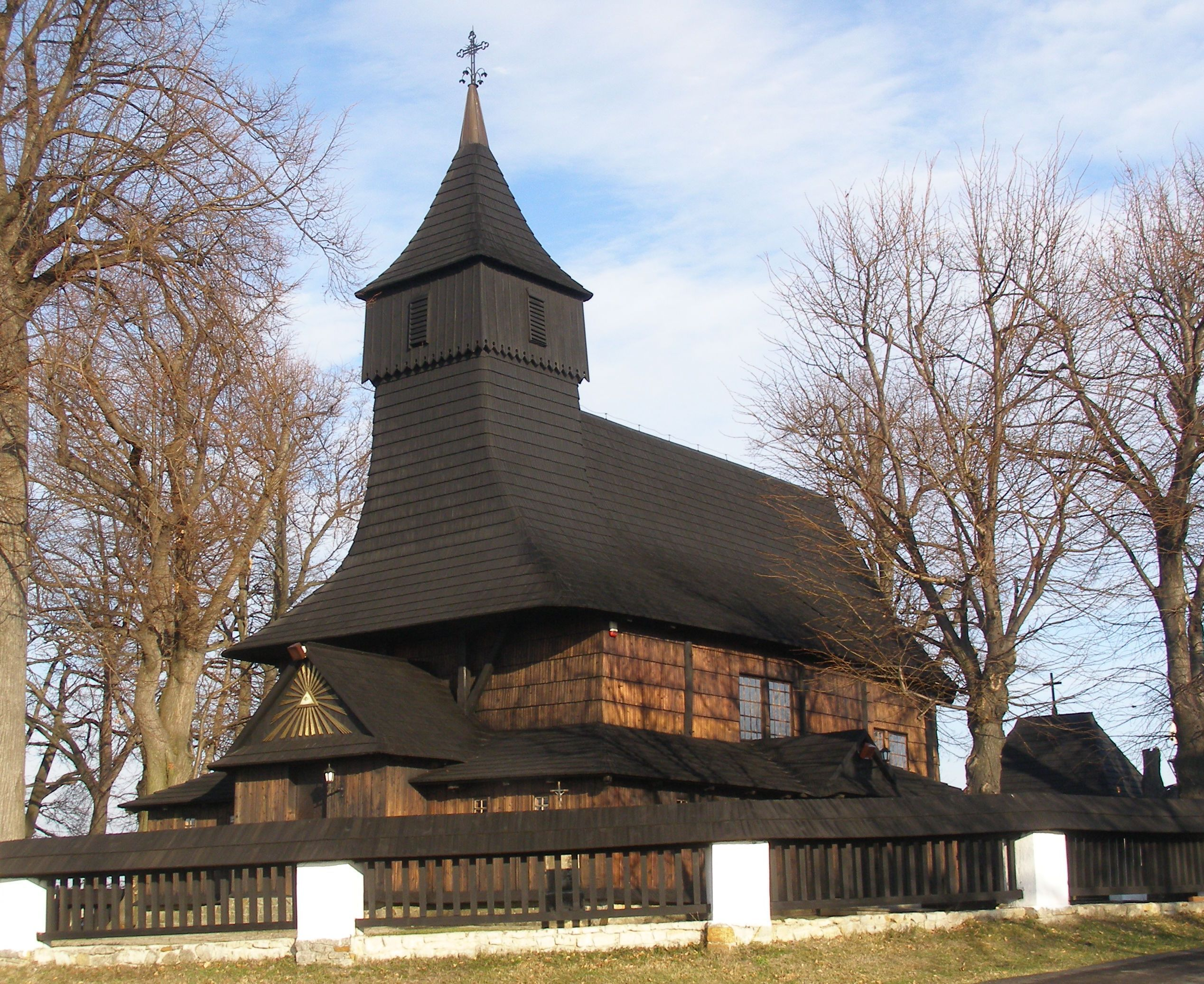
- St. Martin church

- Location within Poland
- Coordinates: 49°58′49″N 21°00′50″E
- Country: Poland
- Voivodeship: Lesser Poland
- County: Tarnów
- Gmina: Tarnów
- Elevation: 384 m (1,260 ft)
- Website: http://www.zawada.net.pl

Zawada [zaˈvada] is a village in the administrative district of Gmina Tarnów, within Tarnów County, Lesser Poland Voivodeship, in southern Poland.
