= Nowodworze =

- Village
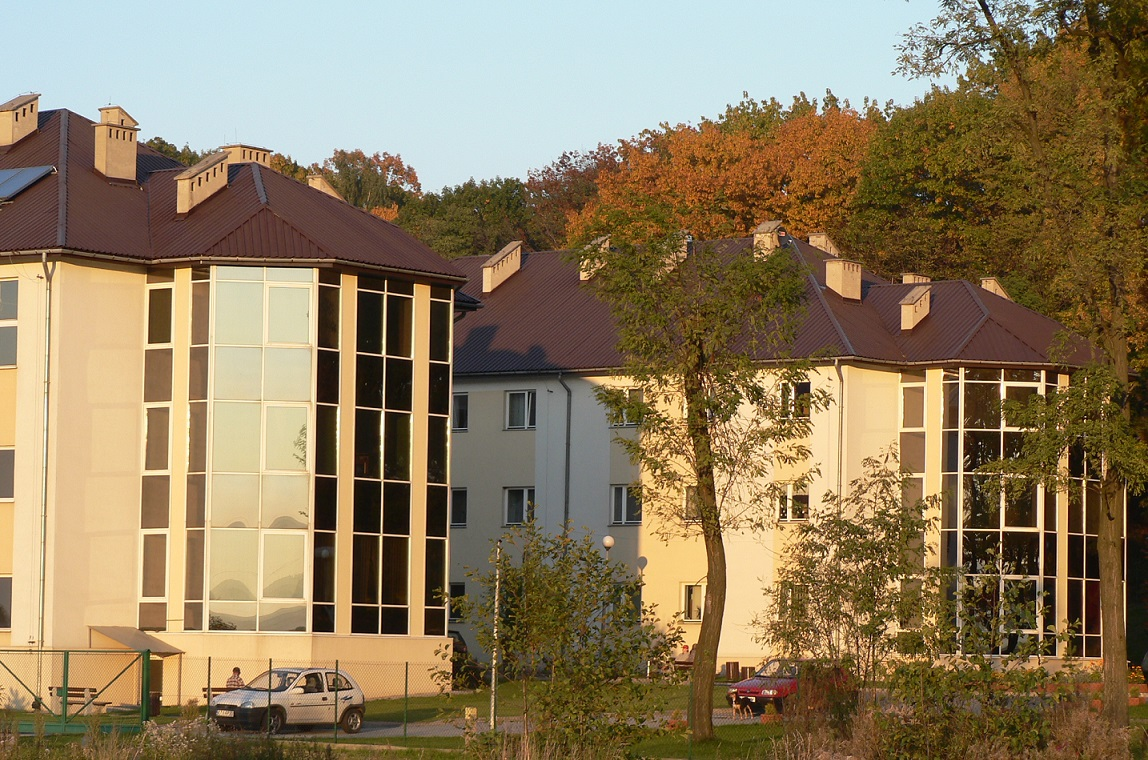

- Location within Poland
- Coordinates: 49°58′N 20°59′E
- Country: Poland
- Voivodeship: Lesser Poland
- County: Tarnów
- Gmina: Tarnów
- Population: 700

Nowodworze ([nɔvɔdˈvɔʐɛ]) is a village in the administrative district of Gmina Tarnów, within Tarnów County, Lesser Poland Voivodeship, in southern Poland.
