= Zgłobice =

- Village
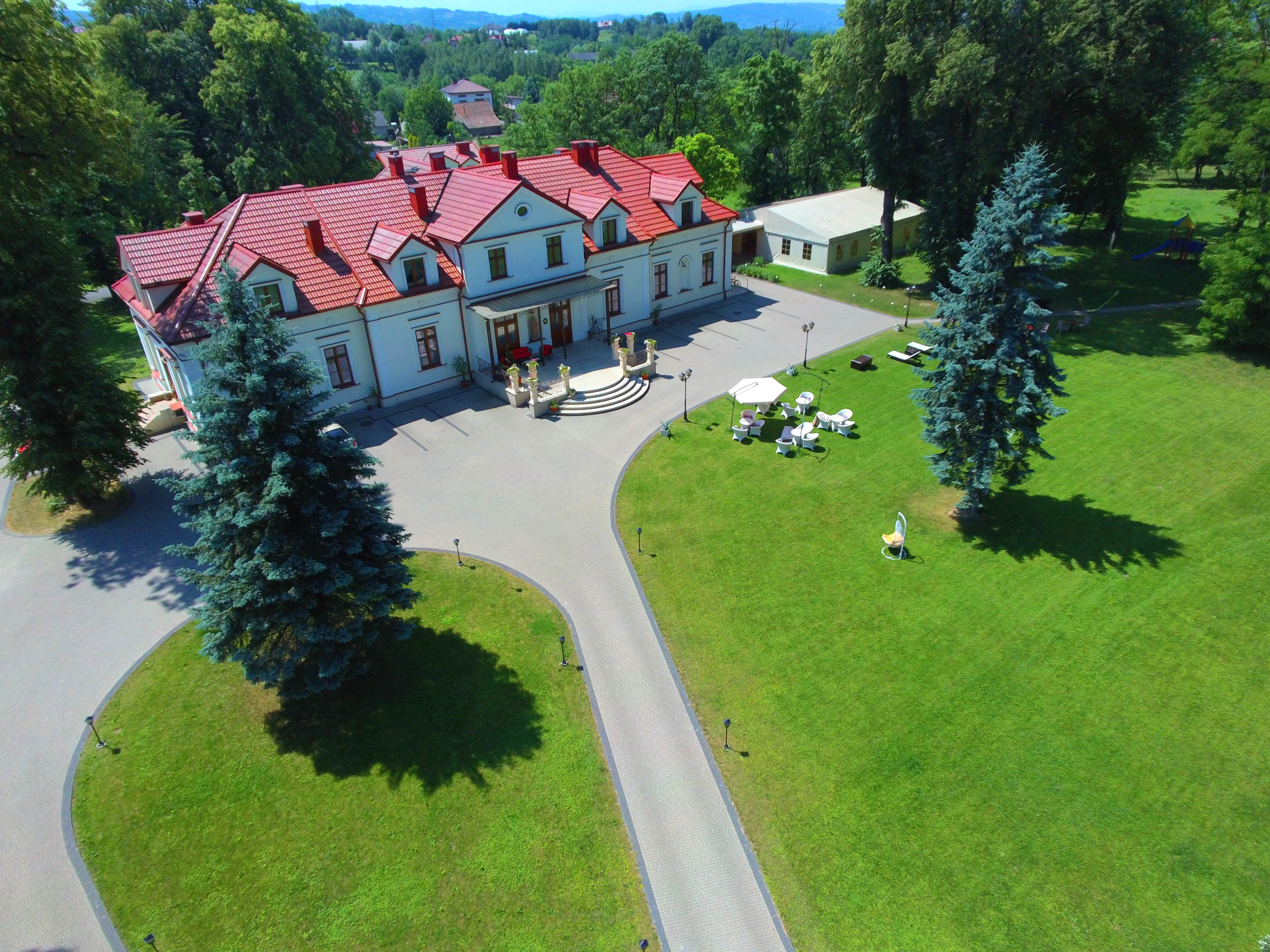
- Manor house

- Location within Poland
- Coordinates: 49°59′N 20°55′E
- Country: Poland
- Voivodeship: Lesser Poland
- County: Tarnów
- Gmina: Tarnów
- Population: 2,598

Zgłobice [zɡwɔˈbit͡sɛ] is a village in the administrative district of Gmina Tarnów, within Tarnów County, Lesser Poland Voivodeship, in southern Poland.
