= The Walk =

The Walk may refer to:

== Arts, entertainment, and media ==
=== Films ===
- The Walk (1953 film), a film directed and starring Renato Rascel
- The Walk (2001 film), an American film
- The Walk (2015 film), a film about Philippe Petit's 1974 tightrope walk at the World Trade Center
- The Walk (2022 film), a period drama film
- The Walk, a 2005 UK production featuring Crispin Bonham-Carter

=== Literature ===
- The Walk (novella), a 1917 novella by Robert Walser

=== Music ===
- The Walk (album), a 2007 album by Hanson
- The Walk (band), a Canadian alternative rock band, 1987
- "The Walk" (Jimmy McCracklin song), 1957
- "The Walk" (Eurythmics song), 1982
- "The Walk" (The Time song), 1982
- "The Walk" (The Cure song), 1983
- "The Walk" (Sawyer Brown song), 1991
- "The Walk", a song by Imogen Heap from Speak for Yourself
- "The Walk", a song by Mayer Hawthorne

=== Television ===
- "The Walk" (The X-Files), an episode of the American science fiction television series The X-Files
- The Walk, a 250-mile pilgrimage walk (featured in The Path season 1) taken by followers of the fictional Meyerism movement
- The Walk TV, an American television network

== Other uses ==
- The Walk (Indiana State), an Indiana State Homecoming tradition
- The Walk, Dubai, an outlet mall and tourist attraction
- Atlantic City Outlets at The Walk, an outlet mall
- The Living Word Fellowship or "The Walk", a group of nondenominational Christian churches in North and South America
- Little Amal, The Walk, performance art featuring an animatronic puppet which represents a refugee child called Little Amal
- The Walk (podcast), a fiction podcast by Naomi Alderman

== See also ==
- Walk (disambiguation)
- Walking (disambiguation)
