= Poręba Radlna =

- Village
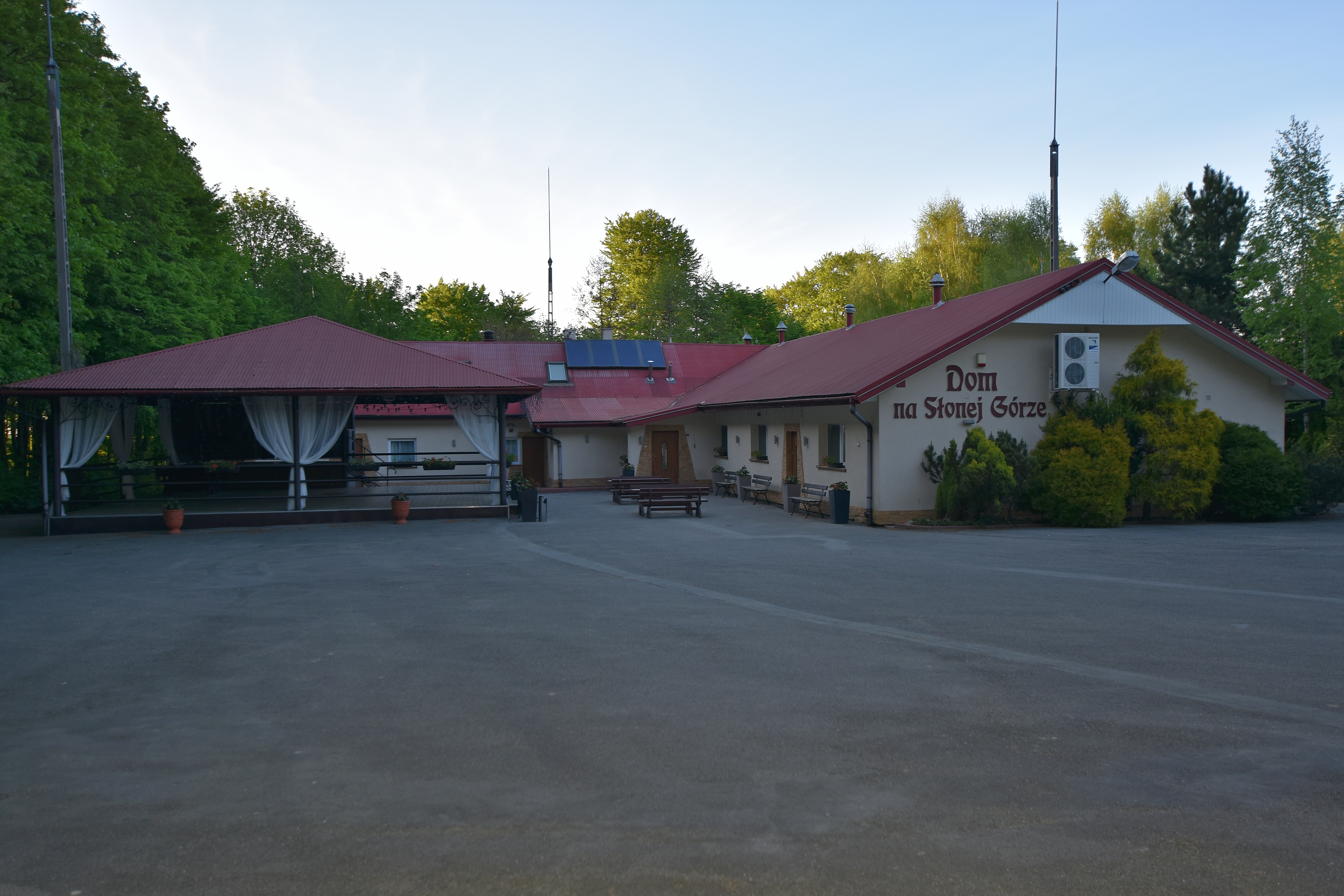

- Location within Poland
- Coordinates: 49°57′N 21°0′E
- Country: Poland
- Voivodeship: Lesser Poland
- County: Tarnów
- Gmina: Tarnów
- Population: 752

Poręba Radlna [pɔˈrɛmba ˈradlna] is a village in the administrative district of Gmina Tarnów, within Tarnów County, Lesser Poland Voivodeship, in southern Poland.
