= Walking (disambiguation) =

Walking is the main form of animal locomotion on land, distinguished from running and crawling.

Walking may also refer to:

== Activities ==
=== Sports ===
- Walk (baseball), an award of first base to a batter following four balls being thrown by the pitcher
- Walking (basketball), taking too many steps with the basketball without dribbling it
- Walking (cricket), a batter leaving the pitch without waiting for the umpire to declare him out
- Racewalking, a track and field (athletics) event

=== Other activities ===
- Fulling, a step in making woolen cloth
- Hiking, walking as a form of exercise or recreation, especially in a nature setting
- Walkout, a form of protest, particularly in a labor context
- Samsara, mundane existence, cyclical existence, "wandering"

== Arts and media ==
=== Music ===
- Walkin', a 1954 album by Miles Davis
- The Walking, a 1988 album by Jane Siberry
- "Walkin", a song by Denzel Curry
- "Walking", a song by The Kelly Family
- "Walking", a song by Soul Asylum from their 1984 album Say What You Will, Clarence...Karl Sold the Truck
- "Walking", a song by Tindersticks from their 1997 album Curtains
- Walking bass

=== Other uses in arts and media ===
- Walking (1961 film), a Soviet drama film
- Walking (1968 film), a film by Ryan Larkin
- "Walking" (essay), an 1861 essay by Henry David Thoreau
- Dérive, the use of walking and journeys in the context of Situationism
- Flâneur, the type of walker recognised in French literature and arts as displaying affluence and the luxury of leisure time

== See also ==
- Walk (disambiguation)
- The Walk (disambiguation)
