= Henryk Schönker =

Polish and Israeli writer and engineer (1931–2019)

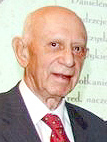
- Henryk Schönker
- Born: 1931; Kraków
- Died: 2019 (aged about 87); Tel Aviv
- Occupation(s): Writer, engineer
- Notable work: The Touch of an Angel

Henryk Schönker (born 1931 in Kraków; died 15/16 January 2019 in Tel Aviv) – Israeli and Polish engineer and writer, witness to the Holocaust.

== Biography ==
Schönker was born in Kraków and grew up in a Jewish family, a son of a well-known painter Leon Schönker and Mina Muenz. In 1937, he and his family moved to Oświęcim, where he attended primary and secondary school. His father inherited a chemical factory producing pesticides named Agrochemia.

At the beginning of World War II, the family continued living in Oświęcim, where Leon Schönker headed the Council of Elders of the Jewish religious community established by the Germans. Henryk's father was among people running an emigration office operating in Oświęcim, founded in the fall of 1939.

In 1941 the family managed to leave Oświęcim shortly before the creation of the Auschwitz concentration camp, and managed to survive the war. Thanks to forged documents, the family ended up in a special camp for displaced persons in Bergen-Belsen, categorised as Palestinian citizens waiting for replacement. They were ultimately freed when the camp was liberated.

After liberation, the Schönker family returned to Oświęcim. Leon reopened the "Agrochemia" factory and was chosen president of the Jewish Religious Association, helping survivors and rebuilding Jewish community life and the town itself. Henryk graduated from the Tadeusz Kościuszko University of Technology, Kraków, with a mechanical engineering diploma.

In 1949, the communists confiscated the Agrochemia factory from the family and imprisoned Leon as part of the war against private business. In 1955 the family was granted permission to leave the country. In 1955, the family left for Vienna, from where Henryk emigrated to Israel in 1961. He worked in the Israeli aviation industry until retirement. Since 1979 he had been creating paintings whose themes revolve around the Holocaust.

== The Touch of an Angel ==
=== Memoir ===
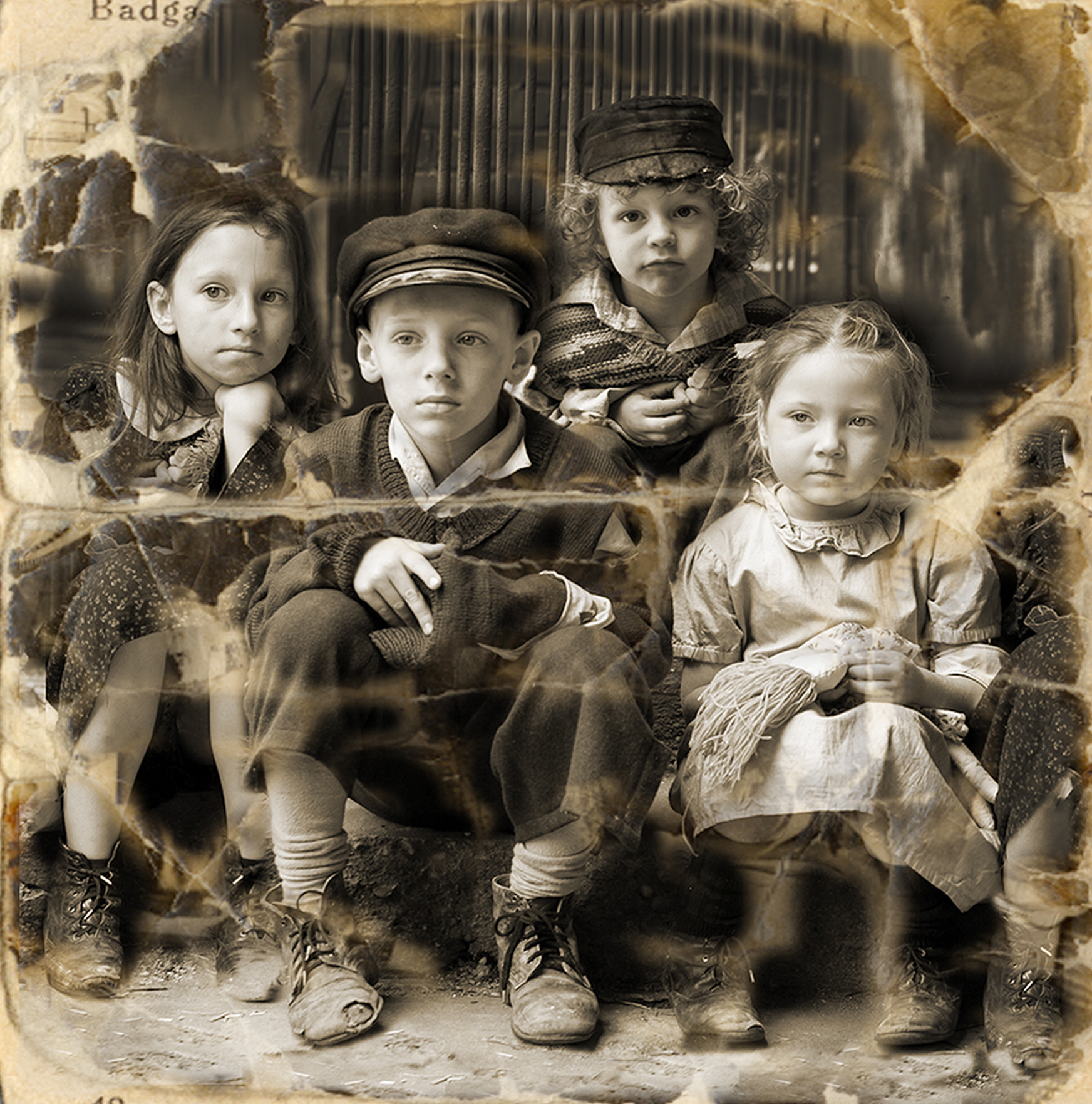
Poster image for the film based on Schönker's memoir, The Touch of an Angel

Henryk Schönker wrote a wartime memoir entitled The Touch of an Angel, for which he received the Polityka Historical Award in 2006. The book is a lyrical monologue of a man returning to places where he found refuge as a Jewish boy during the first years of the Second World War. It also recalls the story of his father's efforts to establish the Bureau of Emigration and help Jews find refuge abroad. The book was written in Polish.

=== Film ===
On the basis of the book, a documentary was made, also titled The Touch of an Angel, directed by Marek Tomasz Pawłowski. The film was shot in authentic interiors of Oświęcim, Kraków, Wieliczka, Bochnia and Tarnów. Both professional actors and inhabitants of Oświęcim portrayed wartime characters from the past. The director incorporated an "archicollage" (archival collage) technique in the film.

== See also ==
- The Touch of an Angel
- Leon Schönker
