= Błonie, Lesser Poland Voivodeship =

Błonie
- Village
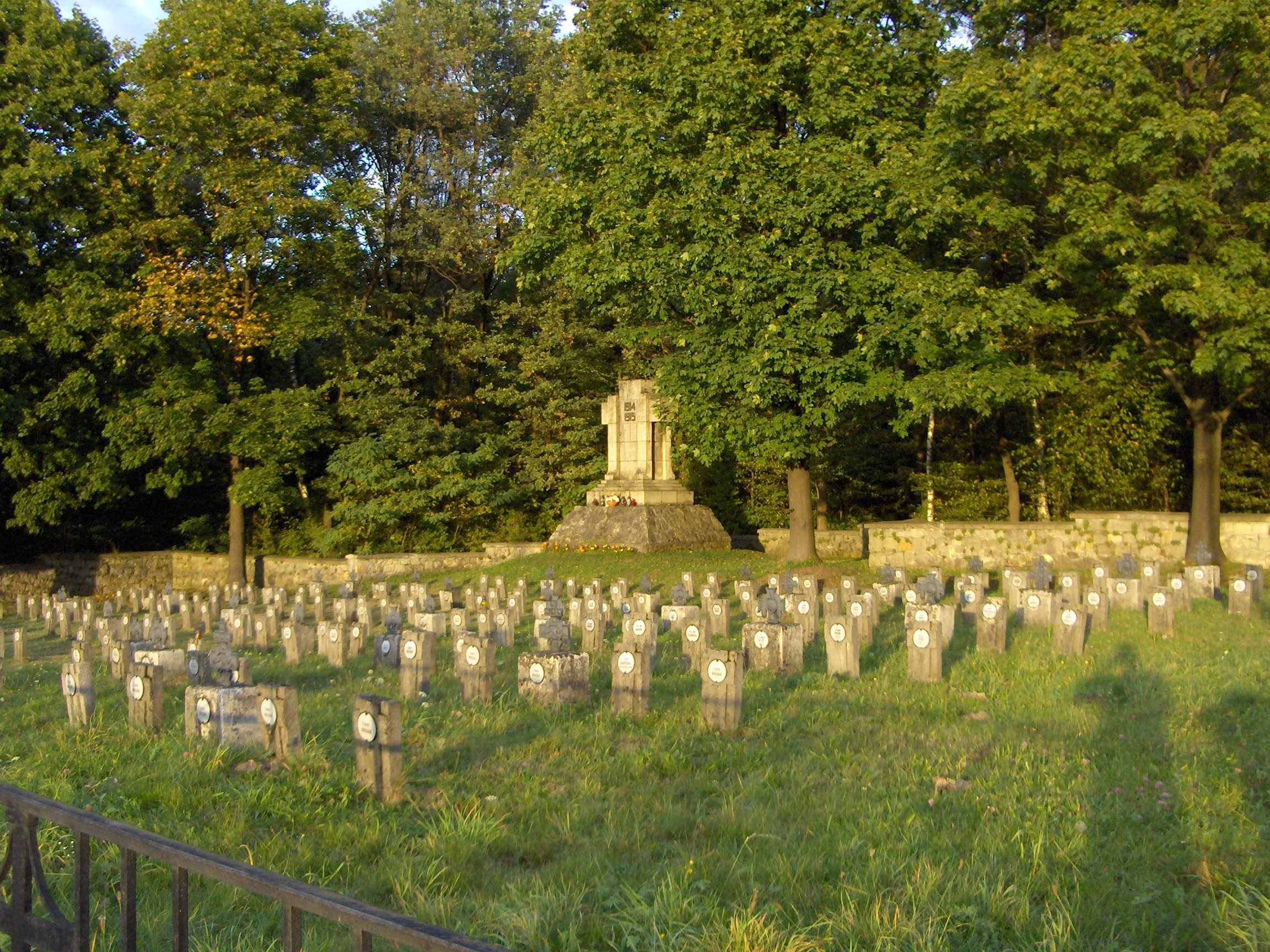
- World War I Cemetery nr 198

- Location within Poland
- Coordinates: 49°58′N 20°55′E
- Country: Poland
- Voivodeship: Lesser Poland
- County: Tarnów
- Gmina: Tarnów

Błonie [ˈbwɔɲɛ] is a village in the administrative district of Gmina Tarnów, within Tarnów County, Lesser Poland Voivodeship, in southern Poland.
