= Walkes =

Walkes is a surname. Notable people with the surname include:

- Anton Walkes (1997–2023), British soccer player
- Corey Walkes, bronze medalist British gymnast at the 2021 Trampoline Gymnastics World Championships
- Keisha Walkes, gold winning discus thrower for Barbados at the 2002 CARIFTA Games
- Reshaun Walkes (born 1999), Canadian soccer player

== See also ==
- Walke (disambiguation)
