= The Touch of an Angel =

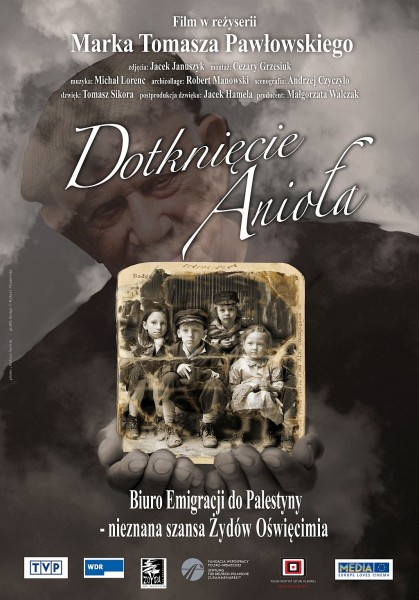
- Theatrical release poster
- Dotknięcie Anioła
- Directed by: Marek Tomasz Pawłowski
- Screenplay by: Marek Tomasz Pawłowski
- Produced by: Małgorzata Walczak
- Cinematography: Jacek Januszyk
- Music by: Michał Lorenc
- Production companies: Zoyda Art Production; Telewizja Polska; Westdeutscher Rundfunk; The Polish Film Institute; The Foundation for Polish-German Cooperation; MEDIA Programme
- Release date: January 22, 2015
- Running time: 62 minutes
- Countries: Poland; Germany
- Language: Polish

The Touch of an Angel (Polish: Dotknięcie anioła) is a 2015 Polish documentary film directed by Marek Tomasz Pawłowski. It is a personal, poetic memoir of a deaf man who returns to the places where he found refuge as a Jewish boy during World War II. He finds his hiding places and bunkers still standing, bringing back horrific memories. The film emphasizes the role of Poles in saving persecuted Jews and indifference of the international community at large in the face of Nazi threats.

== Story ==
Henryk Schoenker, a son of the last leader of the Jewish Community in Oświęcim reveals to the world an unknown story of Jews` legal opportunity to emigrate. Before the idea of the Auschwitz-Birkenau concentration camp was conceived, the Office for Jewish Immigration to Palestine was established in Oświęcim in the fall of 1939. Leon Schoenker, the narrator's father, was tasked to set it up on order by the German military authorities. Thousands of people from all areas of Silesia began to arrive to the town of Oświęcim in the hope of being saved from persecution.

When the elder Schoenker was called to Berlin to report to Adolf Eichmann, he did it enthusiastically, presenting a matter-of-fact plan of international action. Unfortunately, the idea of the legal emigration came to nothing because of the world's indifference.

Completely deaf since the war, Henryk Schoenker comes back to his family's ruined residence that still echoes those distant events. “The horrible sounds of my childhood got inside me as if I were a seashell. Perhaps that is why I became deaf: so I would never forget them,” he says in the film, following the footsteps of his six-year wartime ordeal.

== Cast ==
- Henryk Schoenker - as himself
- Marta Popławska – Mother Mina Schoenker
- Piotr Józef Tomaszewski – Father Leon Schoenker
- Karol Klęczar – Heniu Schoenker
- Zuzia Dudek – Lusia Schoenker
- Bogdan Lęcznar – John Gottowt
- Włodzimierz Nowotarski – Angel
- Mirosław Kramarczyk – Fiddler Birnbaum
- Izabela Warykiewicz – Woman With a Baby
- Oliwka Kania – Fransineke
- Dawid Roszkowski – Ignaś
- Jacek Flasz – Bocian
- Mirosław Ganobis – Officer SD Wieliczka
- Marek Mikołajczyk – Soldier With a Dog
- Mirosław Śmielak – Carpenter
- Julia Niedziela – Carpenter's Mother

and others

== Production ==
The film was shot in authentic interiors in Oświęcim, Kraków, Wieliczka, Bochnia and Tarnów. Historically significant places were able to give testimony to these past events before most of the buildings were destroyed a few months after the shooting of "The Touch of an Angel" was finished.

In the documentary, professional actors and numerous residents of Oświęcim play the real characters from the past. Because everyone had to resemble their wartime counterparts, casting took many months. The man performing the title Angel had to grow gray hair and a beard for a year, keeping the cause of the change of his appearance a secret from his family and friends. Birnbaum, a violin virtuoso, was played by a real violinist from Oświęcim. Beyond their acting talents, the children had to display fortitude in extremely difficult weather conditions.

In addition, the documentary introduces the “archicollage” (archive collage) style – an original invention of the director Marek Tomasz Pawłowski and the graphic designer Robert Manowski that is a new artistic means of recreating past events. It is also worth mentioning that cinematographer Jacek Januszyk shot the movie on a Red Epic camera, thus making “The Touch of an Angel” the first Polish documentary made this way.

The project was consulted by a historian, Zbigniew Stańczyk.

== Screenings ==
=== Film Festivals ===
- BIAF Festival Batumi
- Chagrin Film Festival Ohio
- Denver Film Festival
- Polish Film Festival in America Chicago
- Polish Film Festiwal Ann Arbor
- Bilbao Film Festival
- San Diego Jewish Film Festival
- Miami Jewish Film Festival
- Jewish Film Festival
- Jewish Film Festival in Washington
- Gdynia Film Festival

=== Special screenings ===
- Museum of Tolerance, Los Angeles
- Museum of the Holocaust, Los Angeles
- Museum of Jewish Heritage, New York
- International Public Television Screening Conference (INPUT), Tokyo

== Critical reception ==
Annette Insdorf from The Huffington Post, a film critic and great promoter of Polish cinema, was the first to present the documentary to the American audience. She pointed out the legitimacy of the use of the film's artistic, poetic language called by the director the archicollage.

David Noh from Film Journal International writes that "the up-close, personal approach of this Holocaust doc proves to be its very strength, through one man's harrowing yet inspiring reminiscences. This film, in the ocean of Holocaust-themed works, does really put the viewer in searing human contact with this greatest of tragedies and horrors".

The movie was also reviewed in New York Times by Neil Genzlinger. He appreciates that the movie stands out from other documentaries about Holocaust survivors, thanks to re-enactments and manipulated still images that seek to make the narrative come alive. Genzlinger also praises the main character, Henryk Schoenker, for being an absorbing tour guide to his own life.

Avi Offer of NYC Movie Guru gave The Touch of an Angel a very positive review, calling it emotionally resonating, gripping and vital.
