= Biała, Lesser Poland Voivodeship =

Biała
- Village
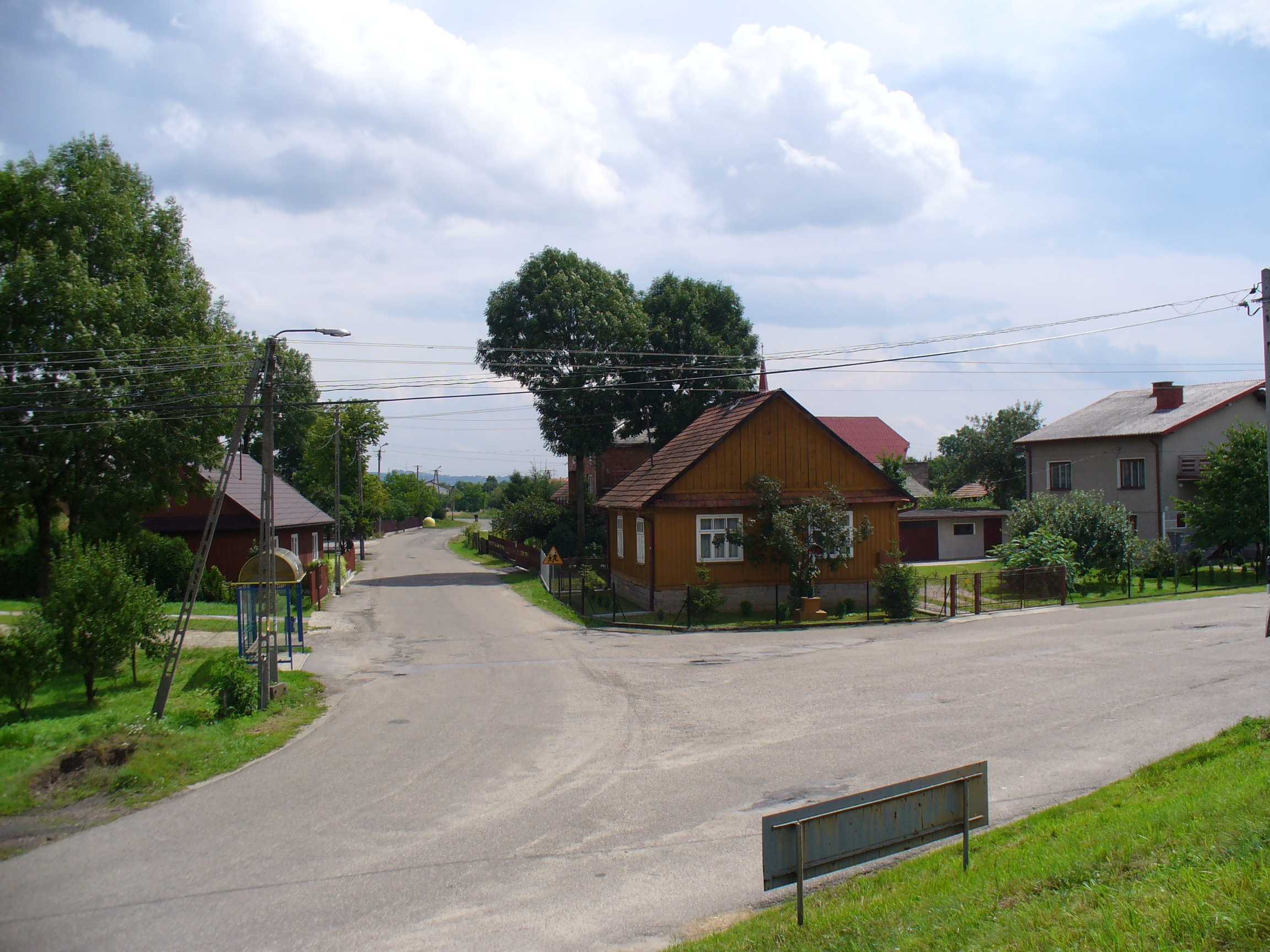

- Location within Poland
- Coordinates: 50°2′30″N 20°55′0″E
- Country: Poland
- Voivodeship: Lesser Poland
- County: Tarnów
- Gmina: Tarnów
- Population (approx.): 640

Biała [ˈbjawa] is a village in the administrative district of Gmina Tarnów, within Tarnów County, Lesser Poland Voivodeship, in southern Poland.

The village has an approximate population of 640.
