= Koszyce Wielkie =

- Village
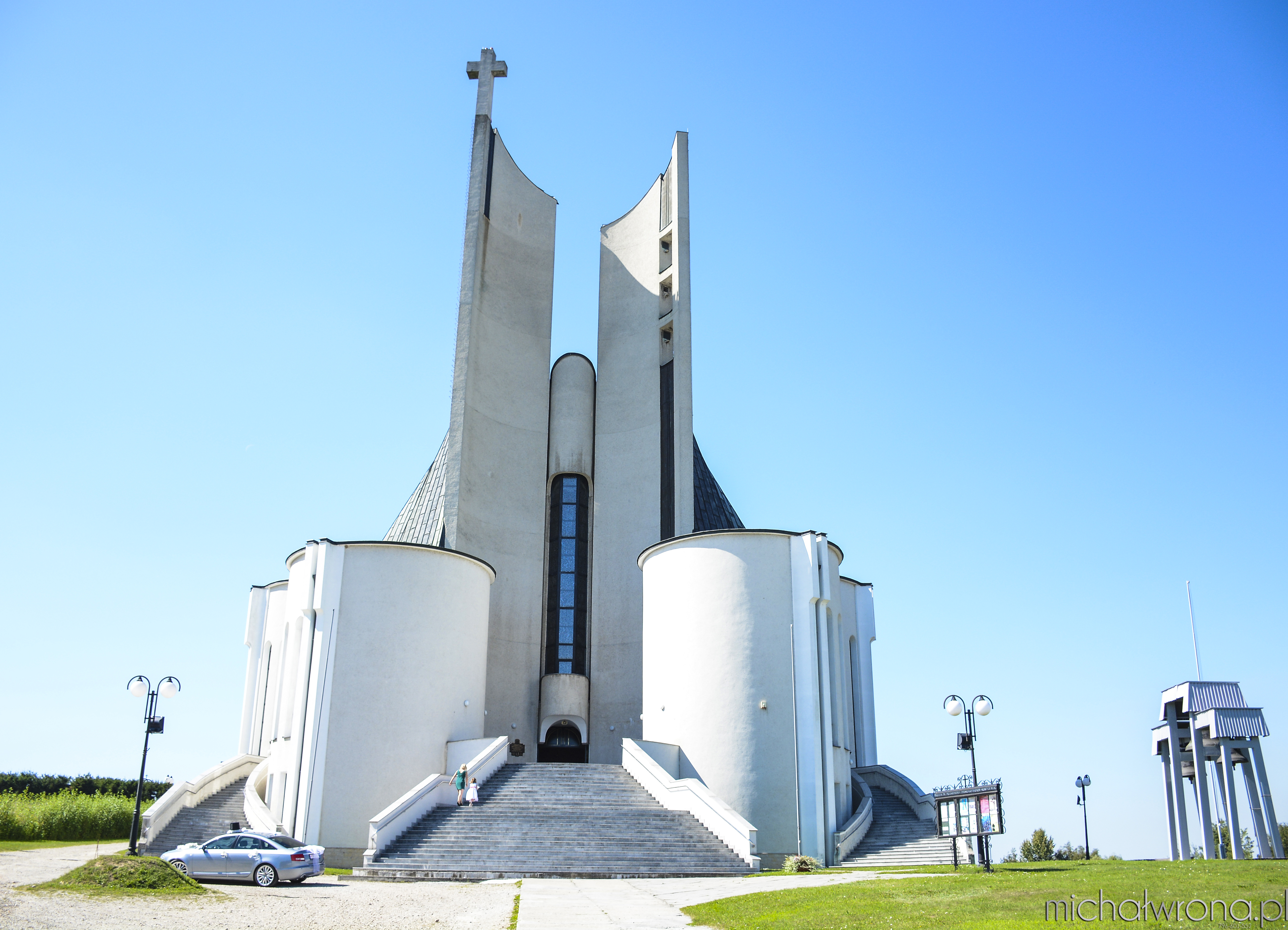
- Church of the Transfiguration of Christ

- Location within Poland
- Coordinates: 49°58′48″N 20°56′39″E
- Country: Poland
- Voivodeship: Lesser Poland
- County: Tarnów
- Gmina: Tarnów
- Elevation: 208 m (682 ft)

Population
  - Total: 2,560

Koszyce Wielkie [kɔˈʂɨt͡sɛ ˈvjɛlkʲɛ] is a village in the administrative district of Gmina Tarnów, within Tarnów County, Lesser Poland Voivodeship, in southern Poland.
