= Walkey =

Walkey is a surname. Notable people with the surname include:

- Andrew John Walkey, UK politician in the 2015 South Oxfordshire District Council election
- Arthur H. Walkey, U.S. politician in the 1892 United States House of Representatives elections
- Frederick P. Walkey, founding director of the DeCordova Sculpture Park and Museum
- Howarth Seymour Walkey, British rear admiral, raised to CBE at the 1956 Birthday Honours
- James Walkey (1880–1960), British Anglican cleric
- Jessalyn Walkey, Canadian field hockey player at the 2009 Women's Pan American Cup
- John Christopher Walkey (1903—1989), British major general; see List of British generals and brigadiers
- John Walkey. Canadian gold medalist at the 2021 World Rowing U23 Championships
- L. H. Walkey, Canadian politician; see Olds (provincial electoral district)
- Mike Walkey, first director of the Durrell Institute of Conservation and Ecology
- Richard Howell Walkey, Australian medical doctor awarded the OAM at the 2014 Australia Day Honours
- Samuel Walkey (1871–1953), British author and bank inspector
- Will Walkey, field reporter for KHOL

== See also ==
- Walkley (surname)
- Walke (disambiguation)
- Walki (disambiguation)
- Walkie (disambiguation)
