= Zbylitowska Góra =

- Village
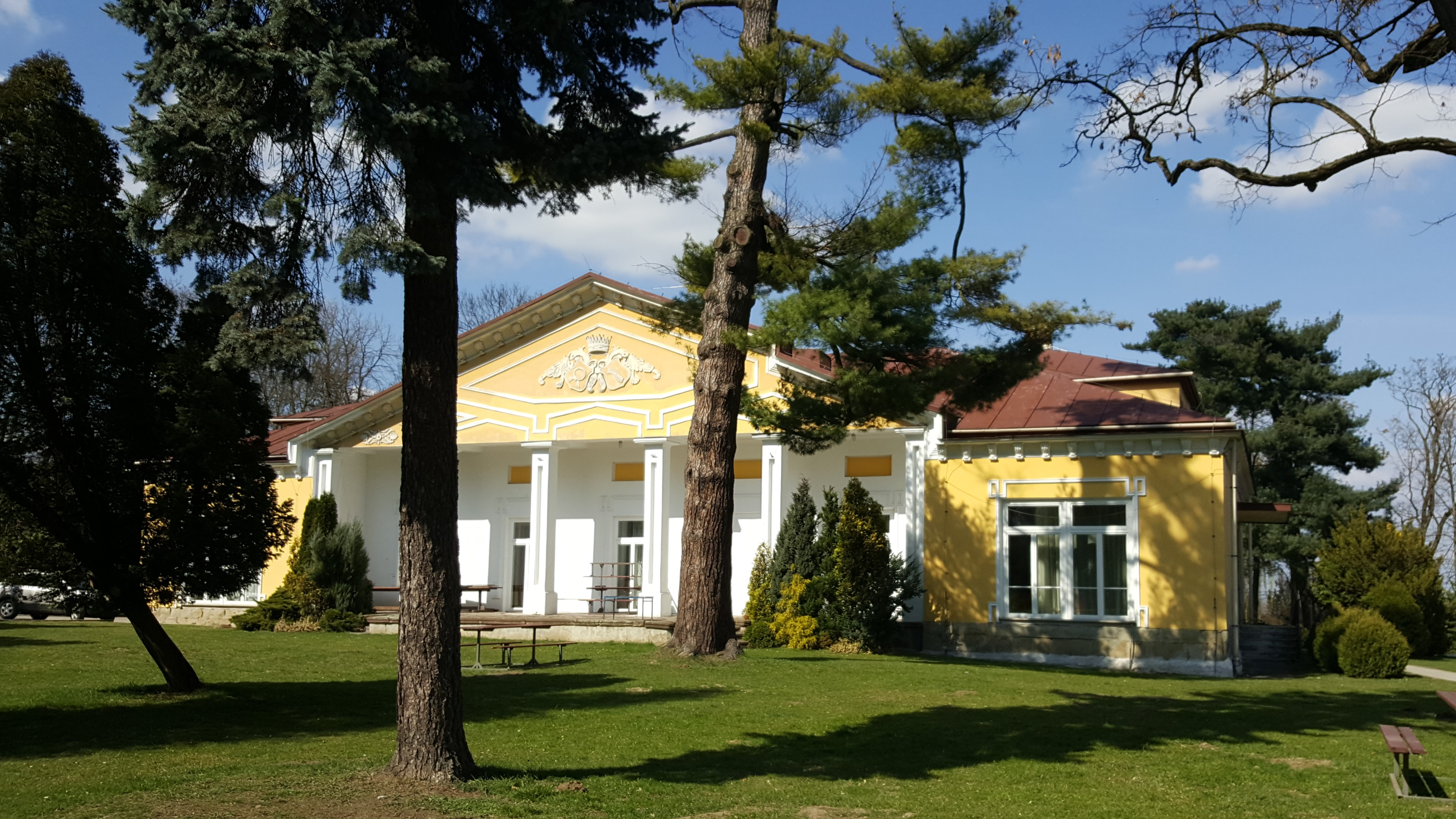
- Historic manor from the 19th century

- Location within Poland
- Coordinates: 49°59′N 20°55′E
- Country: Poland
- Voivodeship: Lesser Poland
- County: Tarnów
- Gmina: Tarnów

Zbylitowska Góra pronounced [zbɨliˈtɔfska ˈɡura] is a village in the administrative district of Gmina Tarnów, within Tarnów County, Lesser Poland Voivodeship, in southern Poland. It is the site of a mass grave from World War II, marked by a monument.

== World War II history ==
During the invasion of Poland in World War II, the German army took over the area on 7 September 1939. In nearby Tarnów, some 40 synagogues and Jewish prayer houses were blown up and burned down before December. In March 1941 the Tarnów Ghetto was set up by the Nazis. Some 40,000 Jews were imprisoned there.

=== Buczyna woods ===
From June 1942 until 1943, during the Final Solution, the Nazi Germans used the Buczyna forest in Zbylitowska Góra as a remote mass execution site. Approximately 10,000 people were murdered there and buried in pits. The executions were carried out usually from 5 a.m. till 1 p.m. The largest mass shooting action took place around 11 June 1942. The massacre took the lives of 6,000 Jewish men, women and children from the Tarnów Ghetto, including 800 children from the orphanage, who were killed in the pits with hand grenades. It is reported that small children who were not killed by gunfire or initial blasts were swung by their ankles into nearby rocks to ensure there would be no survivors. On top of the Jewish victims, there were 2,000 Christian Poles murdered at Zbylitowska Góra. The Buczyna forest is the place of Jewish martyrology and the focus of ongoing archaeological research using non-invasive radar technology.

== Mass graves of Zbylitowska Góra ==
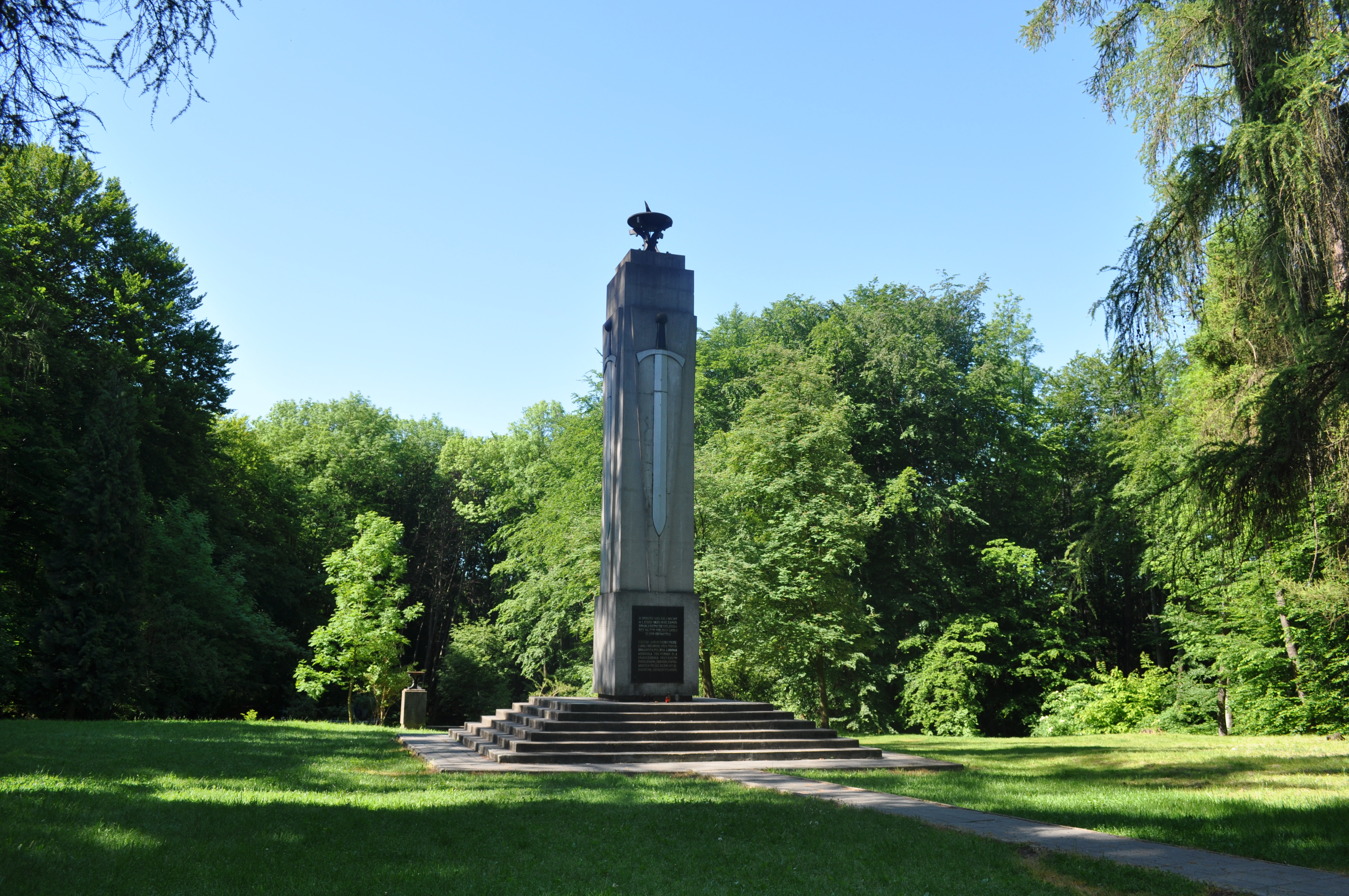

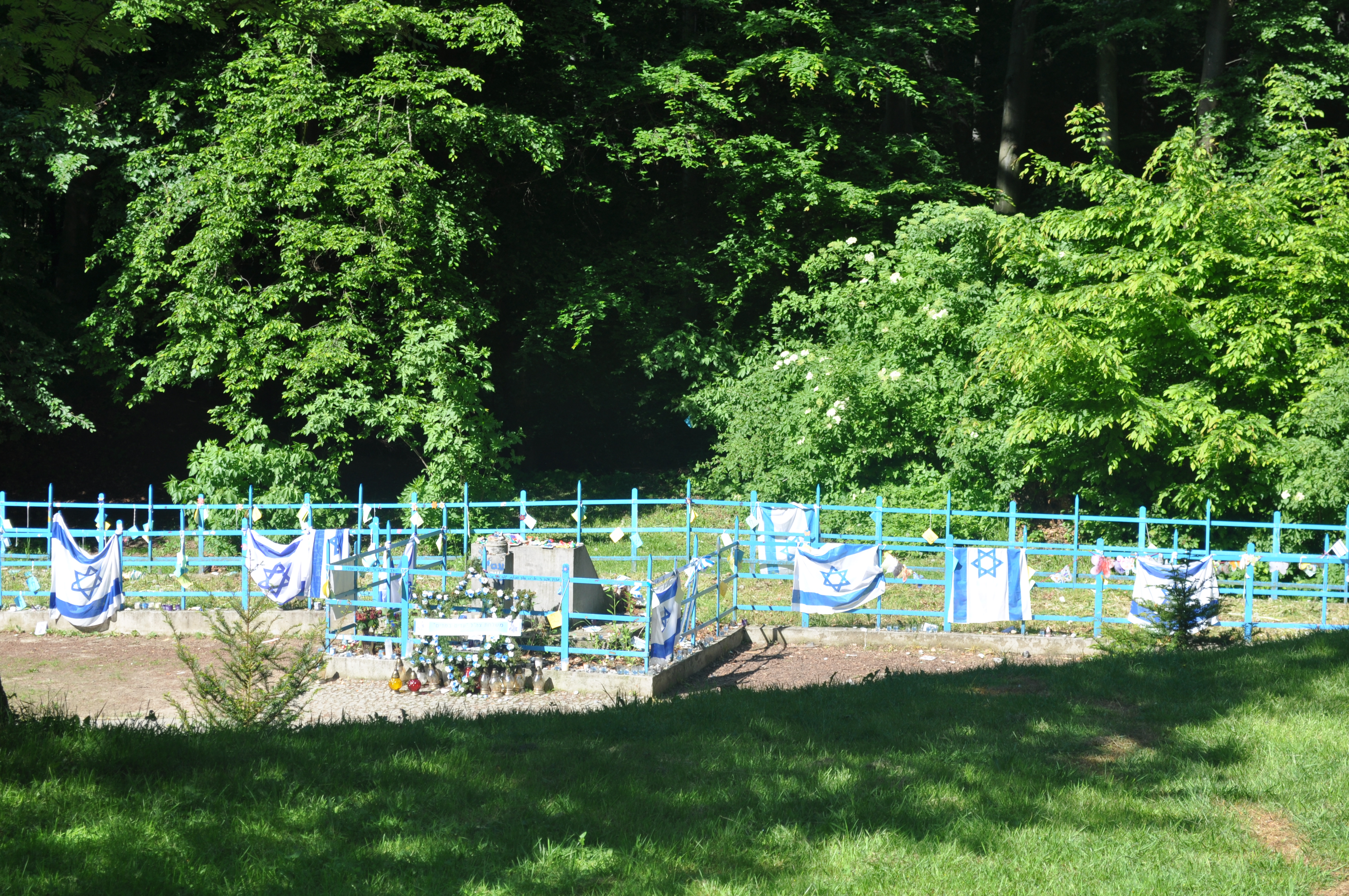

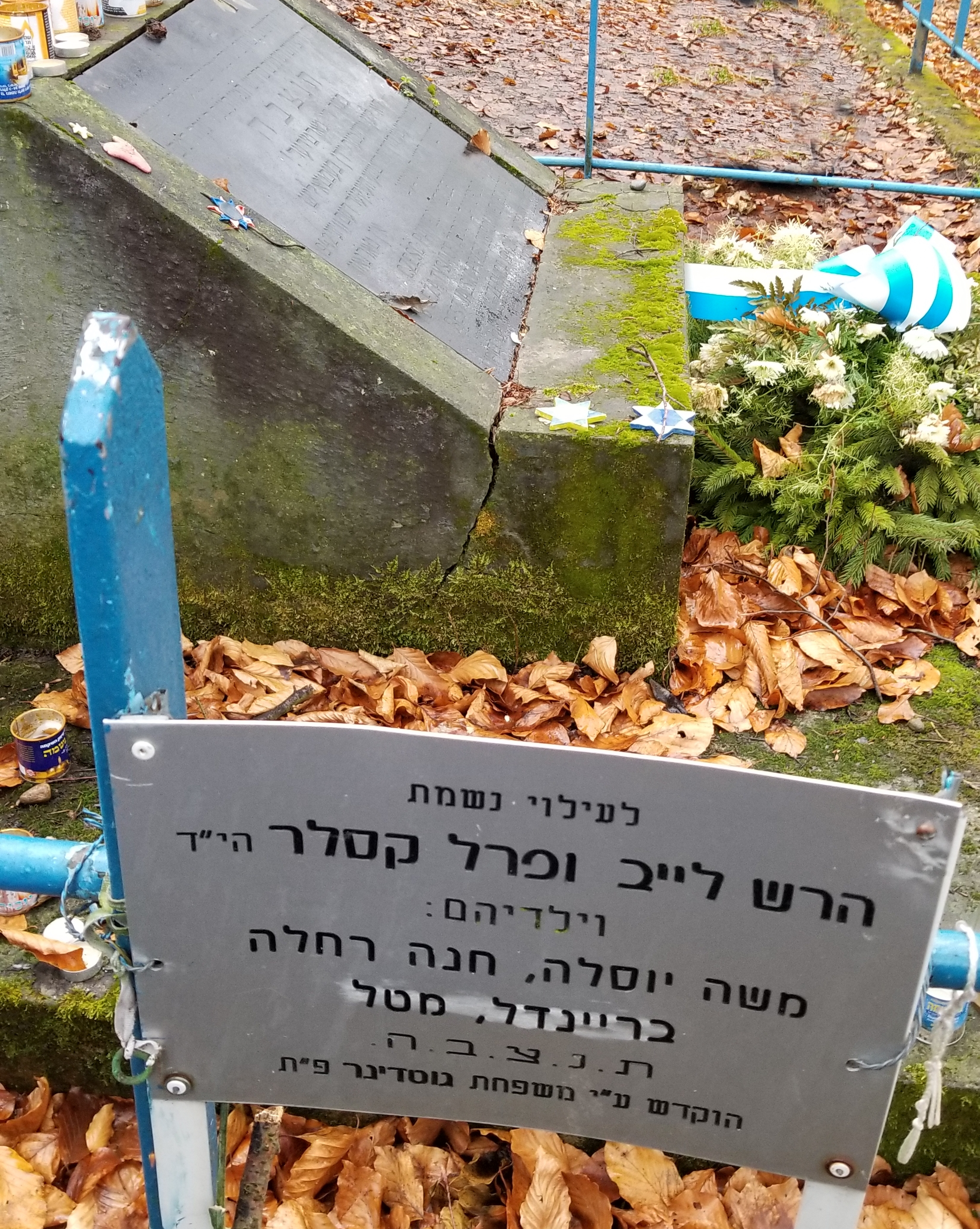

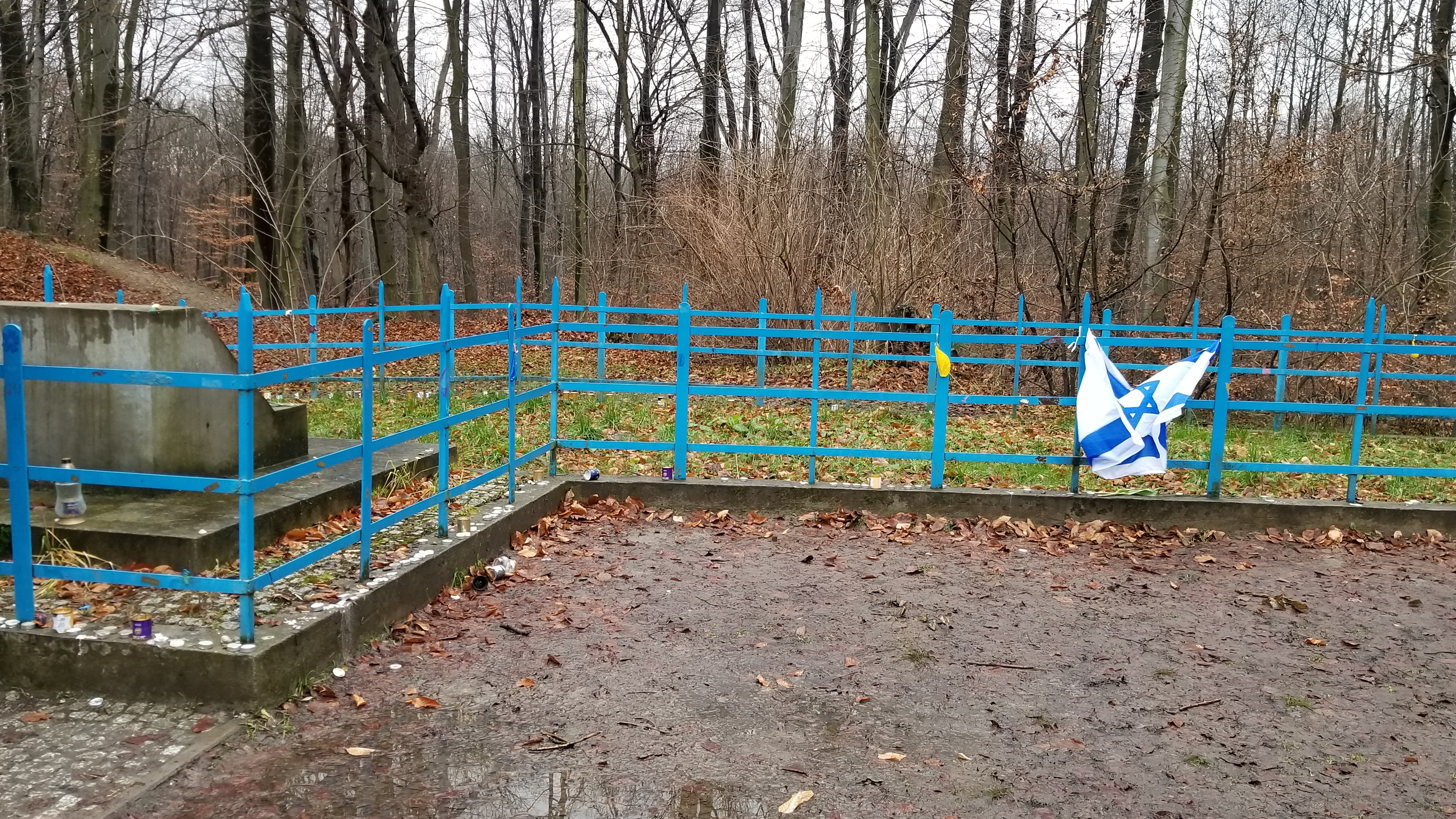

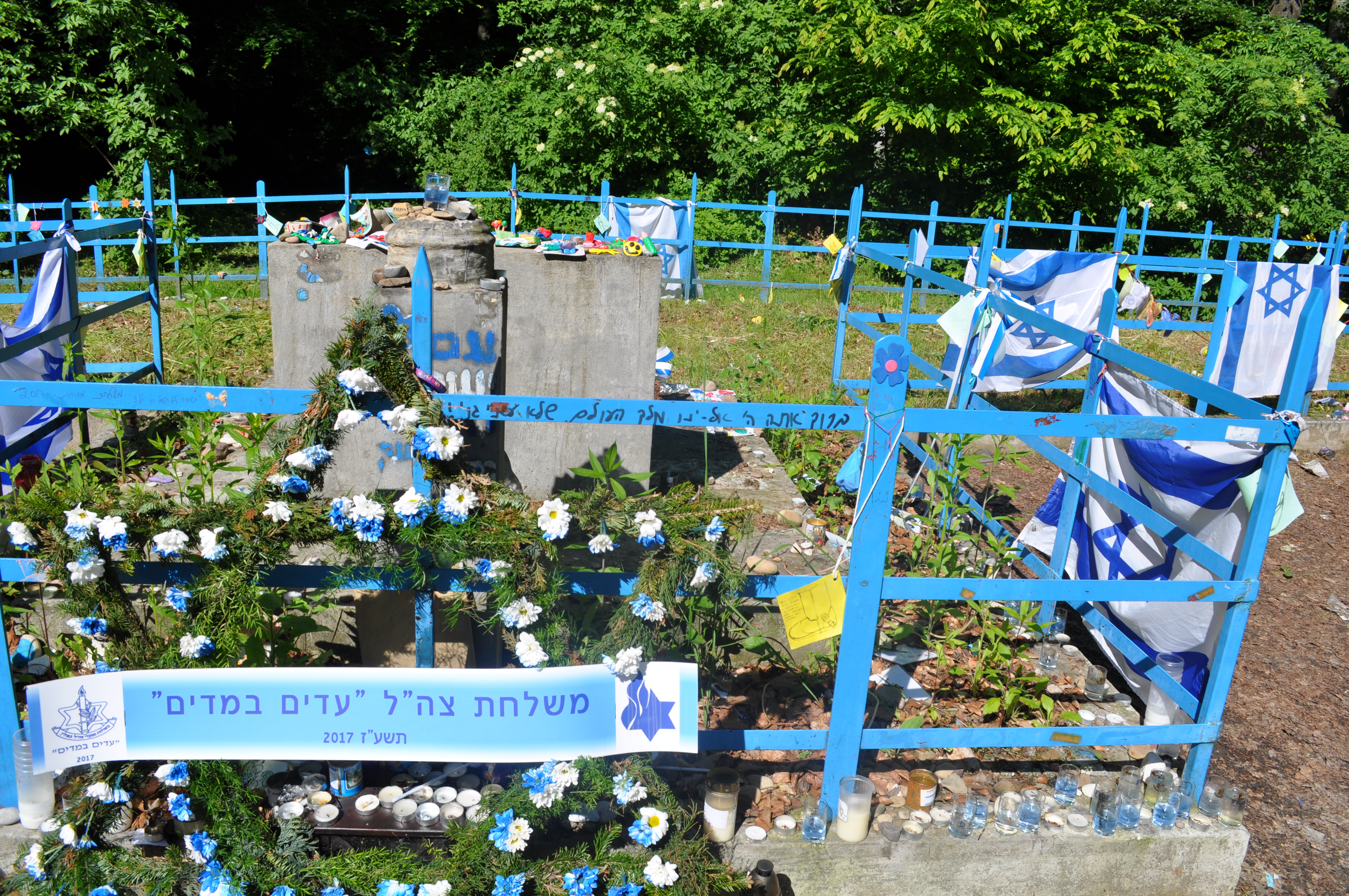
