= Tarnowiec, Lesser Poland Voivodeship =

Tarnowiec
- Village
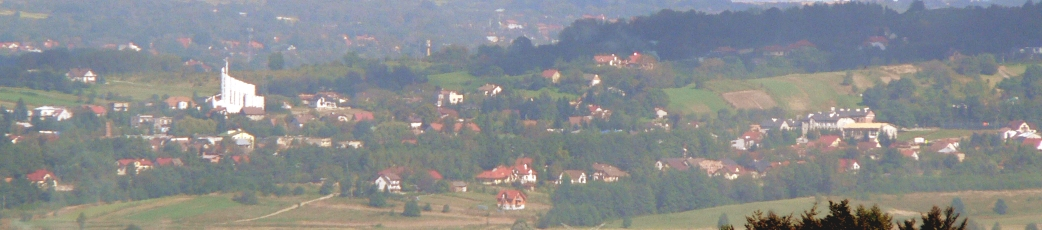

- Location within Poland
- Coordinates: 49°58′52″N 20°59′9″E
- Country: Poland
- Voivodeship: Lesser Poland
- County: Tarnów
- Gmina: Tarnów
- Population (approx.): 3,500

Tarnowiec [tarˈnɔvjɛt͡s] is a village in the administrative district of Gmina Tarnów, within Tarnów County, Lesser Poland Voivodeship, in southern Poland.

The village has an approximate population of 3,500.
