= Wola Rzędzińska =

- Village
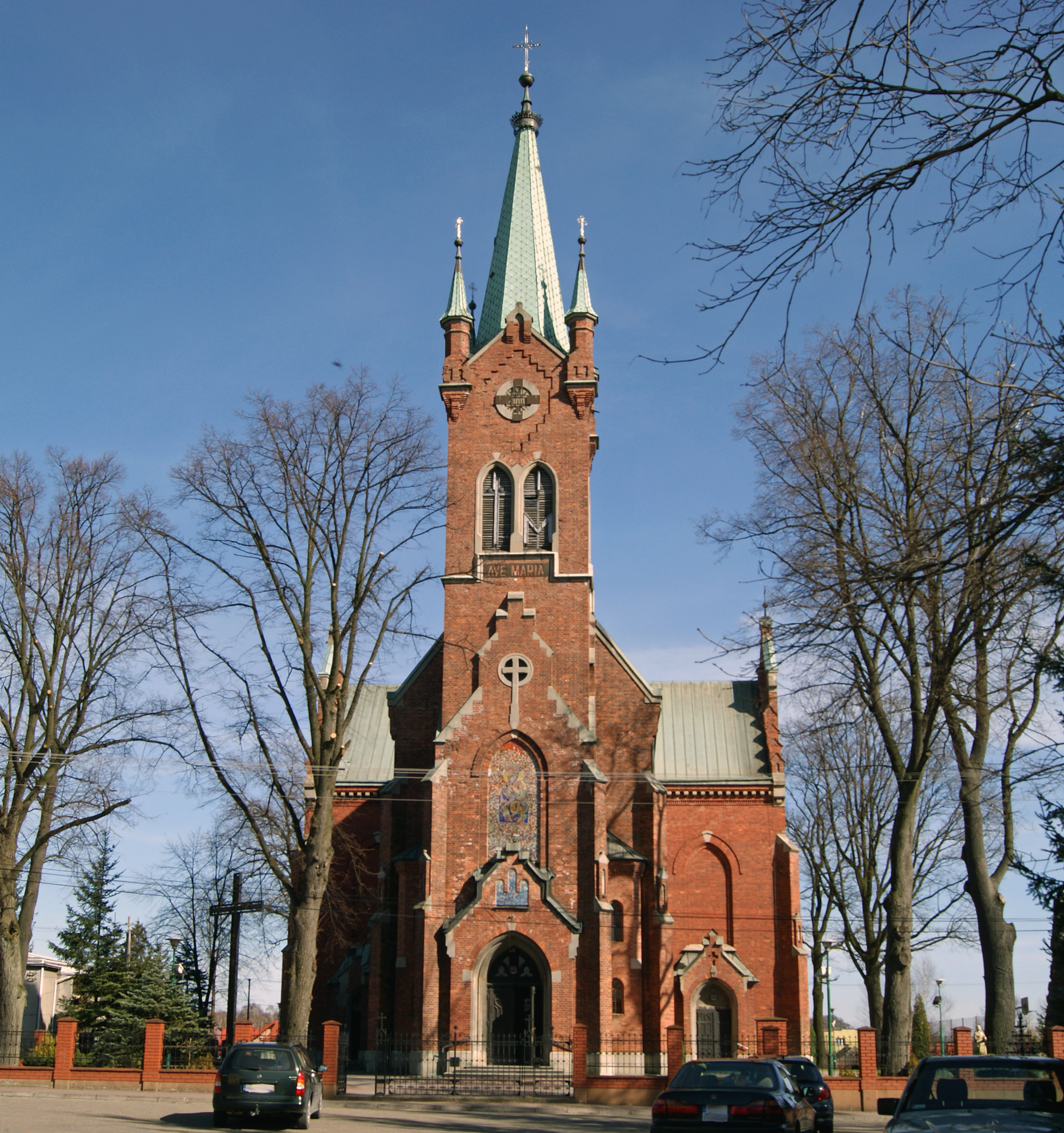
- Church of Our Lady of Perpetual Help

- Location within Poland
- Coordinates: 50°3′N 21°5′E
- Country: Poland
- Voivodeship: Lesser Poland
- County: Tarnów
- Gmina: Tarnów
- Website: http://www.wrz.yoyo.pl

Wola Rzędzińska [ˈvɔla ʐɛnˈd͡ʑiɲska] is a village in the administrative district of Gmina Tarnów, within Tarnów County, Lesser Poland Voivodeship, in southern Poland.
