= Łękawka =

- Village
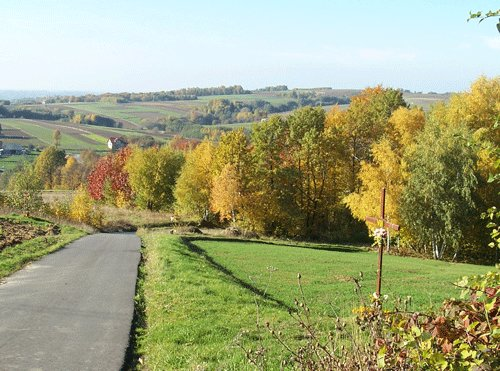

- Location within Poland
- Coordinates: 49°56′36″N 21°1′50″E
- Country: Poland
- Voivodeship: Lesser Poland
- County: Tarnów
- Gmina: Tarnów
- Elevation: 500 m (1,600 ft)
- Population (approx.): 700

Łękawka [wɛnˈkafka] is a village in the administrative district of Gmina Tarnów, within Tarnów County, Lesser Poland Voivodeship, in southern Poland.

The village has an approximate population of 700.
