= Walke =

Walke may refer to:

== Military destroyers ==
- USS Walke
  - USS Walke (DD-34), a 1910 Paulding-class destroyer
  - USS Walke (DD-416), a Sims-class destroyer
  - USS Walke (DD-723), an Allen M. Sumner-class destroyer
- USS Walke incident, naval blockade from 1951 to 1953, during the Korean War

== People ==
- Alexander Walke (born 1983), German professional football goalkeeper
- Annie Walke (1888–1965), Newlyn School artist and wife of Bernard Walke
- Bernard Walke (1874–1941), Anglican priest
- Henry A. Walke (1809–1896), United States Navy Officer
- Bernhard Walke (born 1940), pioneer of mobile Internet access and professor emeritus
- Collin Walke (born 1982), American politician
- Olive Walke (1911–1969), Trinidadian musician and ethnomusicologist

== Places ==
- Walke Manor House, neighborhood of Old Donation Farm, Virginia Beach, Virginia
- Anthony and Susan Cardinal Walke House, residence in Chillicothe, Ohio, United States
- Swinley Walke, Crown Estate woodland in Berkshire, England

== See also ==
- Walkey
- Walkes
- Walske
- Walkie (disambiguation)
- Walki (disambiguation)
- Walk (disambiguation)
