= Edwin Walkley =

Australian cricketer

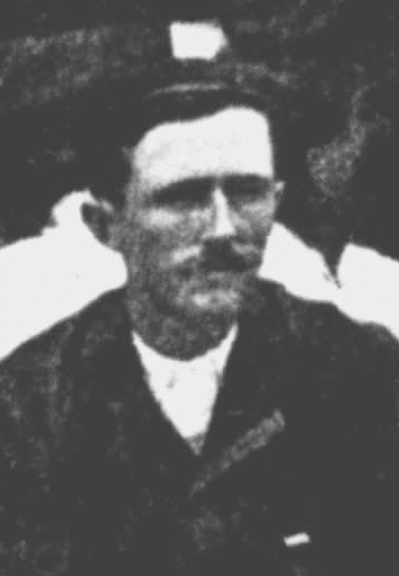

Personal information
- Born: 10 May 1876; Wallaroo, South Australia
- Died: 18 April 1950 (aged 73)
- Source: Cricinfo, 29 September 2020

Edwin Walkley (10 May 1876 – 18 April 1950) was an Australian cricketer. He played in four first-class matches for South Australia between 1900 and 1902.

== See also ==
- List of South Australian representative cricketers
