= Walki, Belgaum =

Walki
- Village
- Location in Karnataka, India Walki (India)
- Coordinates: 16.380385°N 74.446213°E
- Country: India
- State: Karnataka
- District: Belgaum

Languages
  - Official: Kannada
- Time zone: UTC+5:30 (IST)

Walki is a village in Belgaum district in the southern state of Karnataka, India.
