= Jodłówka-Wałki =

- Village
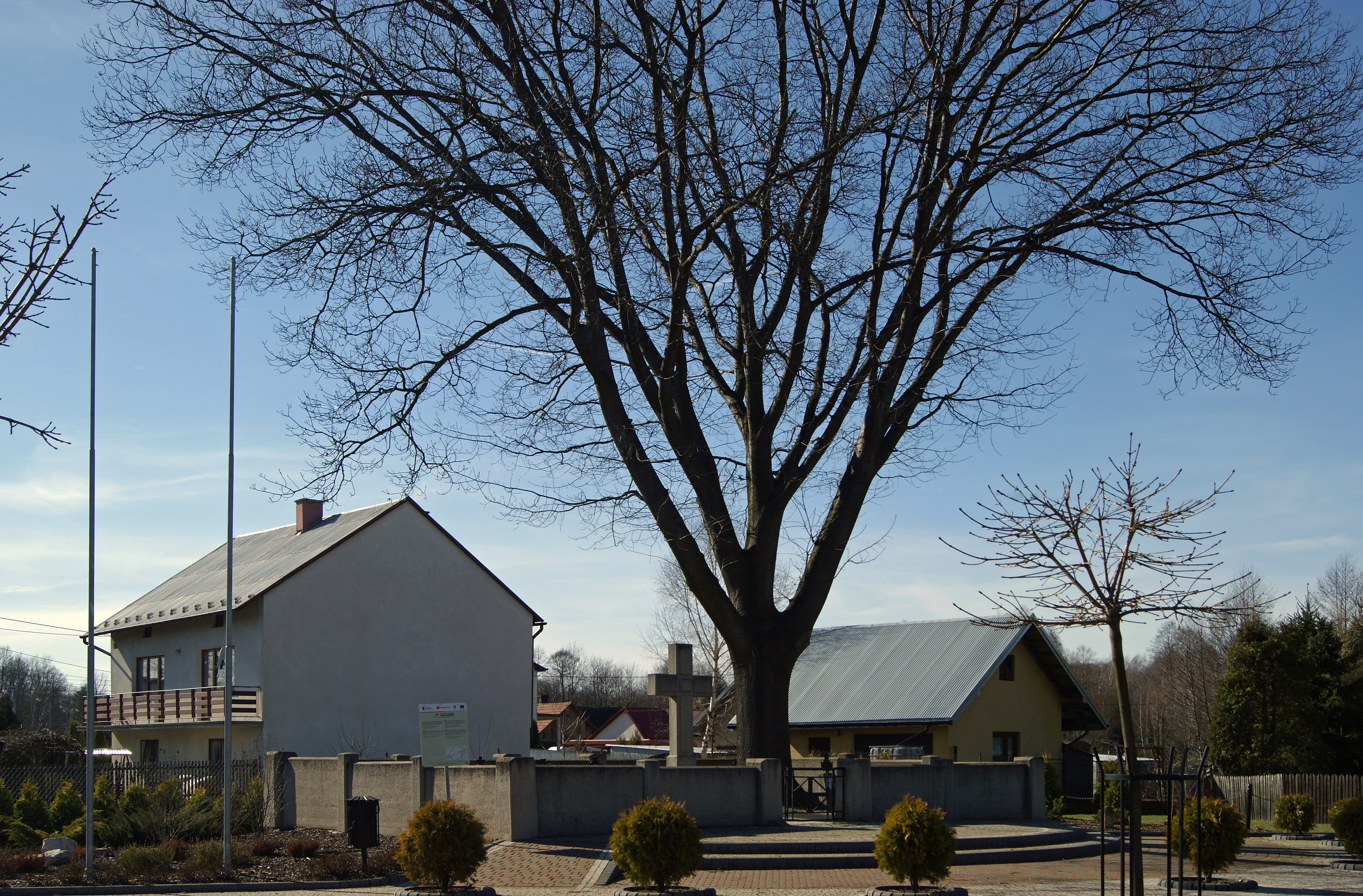

- Location within Poland
- Coordinates: 50°03′46″N 21°06′44″E
- Country: Poland
- Voivodeship: Lesser Poland
- County: Tarnów
- Gmina: Tarnów

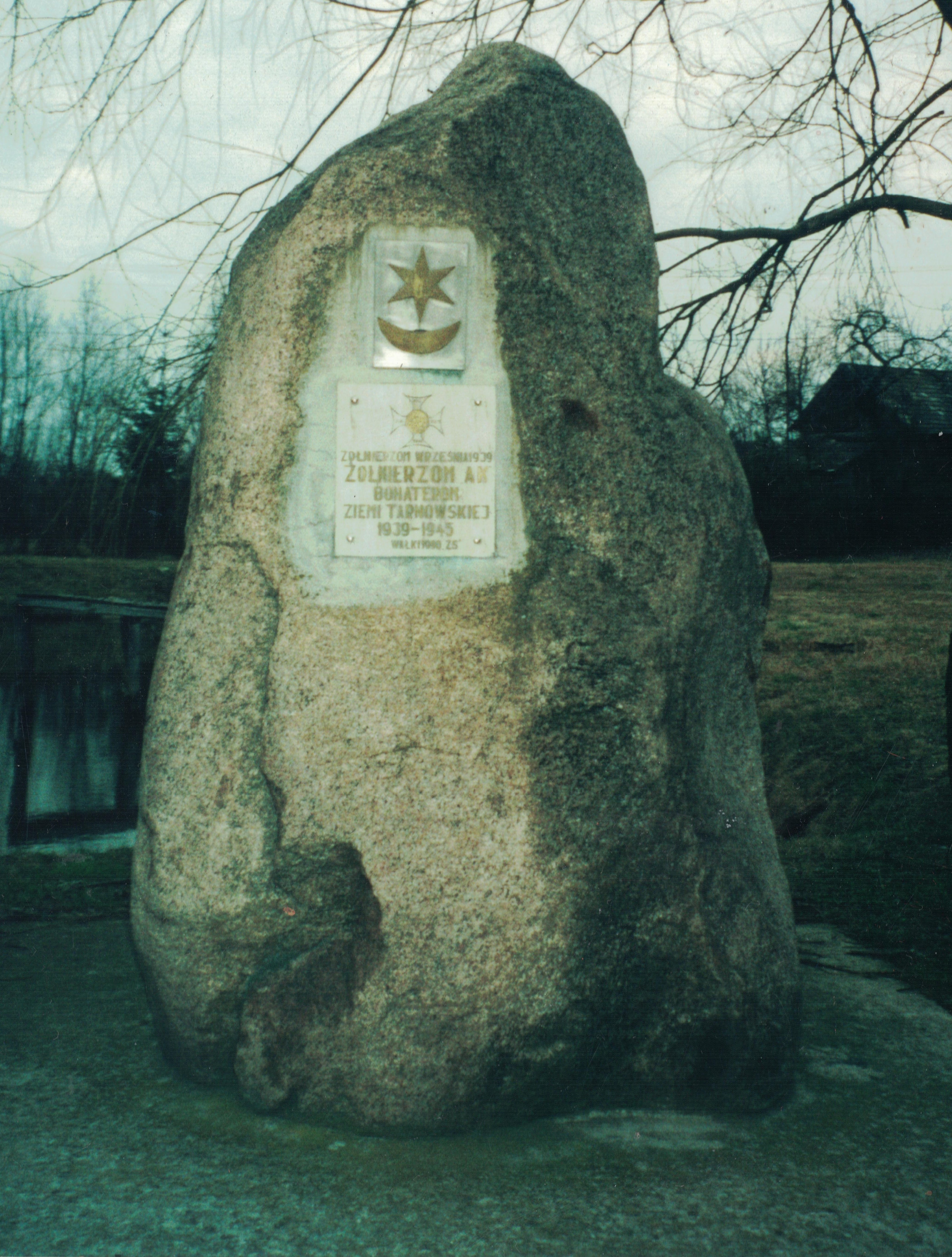

Jodłówka-Wałki [jɔdˈwufka ˈvau̯ki] is a village in the administrative district of Gmina Tarnów, within Tarnów County, Lesser Poland Voivodeship, in southern Poland.

== World War II Memorial ==
In 1989-1990 a monument was erected in the memory of area soldiers who served and died in WWII. It was established by Stanisław Zając, who placed it at the edge of his land, by the road leading into the village center. It was dedicated and blessed in the fall of 1991. The memorial is made of up a single, large rock, with a plaque of the Tarnów coat of arms followed by the following:

Żołnierzom Września 1939

Żołnierzom AK

Bohaterzy

Ziemi Tarnowskiej

1939-1945

Wałki1990.ZS

The plaque translates to:

"To the soldiers of September 1939

To the Soldiers AK

Heroes

Of the Land of Tarnow

1939-1945

Wałki 1990.ZS"
