= Walk (disambiguation) =

A walk is walking, the main form for animal locomotion on land, distinguished from running and crawling.

Walk or WALK may also refer to:

== Places ==
- Walk, Livonia, the German name for a town in Livonia
- Island Walk, an unincorporated area and a census-designated place (CDP) in Collier County, Florida, United States
- Walk Glacier, a glacier in the Jones Mountains, Antarctica

== Persons ==
- Bob Walk (born 1956), American baseball pitcher
- Mark Walk, American music composer
- Neal Walk (1948–2015), American, National Basketball Association center

== Arts, entertainment, and media ==
=== Music ===
==== Albums and EPs ====
- Walk (album), a 2024 album by NCT 127
- Walk, a 1996 album by Andrew Peterson
- Walk (Pantera EPs), a series of EPs by Pantera, 1993
- Walk (Kwabs EP), 2014
- Walk (Grayson|Reed EP), 2017

==== Songs ====
- "Walk" (Comethazine song)
- "Walk" (Foo Fighters song)
- "Walk" (Kwabs song)
- "Walk" (Pantera song)
- "Walk", a song by Blind Melon from Soup
- "Walk", a song by Agnez Mo from her self titled album
- "Walk", a song by Itzy from Girls Will Be Girls
- "Walk", a single by Peakboy
- "Walk", a song by Playboi Carti from Music
- "Walk", a single by Saucy Santana
- "Walk," a song by The Wiggles from Yummy Yummy
- "A Walk", single from the punk rock group Bad Religion
- "A Walk", a song by Tycho from Dive

=== Periodicals ===
- Walk: the Magazine of the Ramblers' Association, a UK walking magazine

=== Radio stations ===
- WALK-FM, a radio station (97.5 FM) licensed to serve Patchogue, New York, United States
- WLID, a radio station (1370 AM) licensed to serve Patchogue, New York, United States, known as WALK from 1952 to 2019
- WKAO, a radio station (91.1 FM) licensed to Ashland, Kentucky, United States. One of the 7 Walk FM network of contemporary Christian radio stations based in Ashland, Kentucky, United States

== Other uses ==
- Walk (graph theory), in graph theory, an alternating sequence of vertices and edges
- Base on balls, also called a walk, in baseball, an award of first base to a batter following four balls being thrown by the pitcher
- Battle of Walk, war started on July 8, 1657 between Swedish and Russian forces
- Pedestrian crossing#Signalized intersections, also called walks or walkways

== See also ==
- The Walk (disambiguation)
- Walking (disambiguation)
- Walke (disambiguation)
- Wok
