= Tarnów Ghetto =

Jewish ghetto in Poland

The Tarnów Ghetto
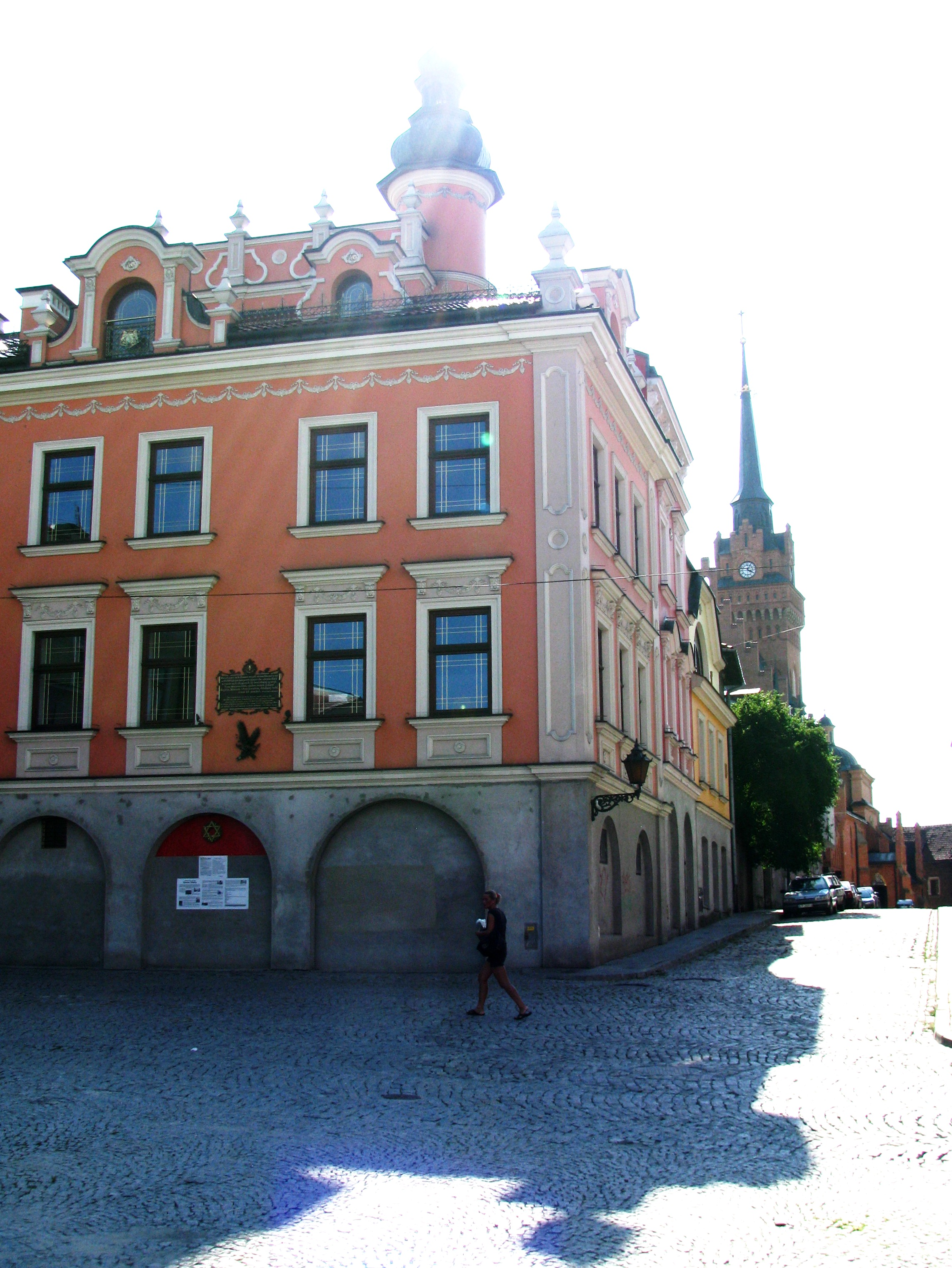
- Der Yiddisher Huiz museum

The Tarnów Ghetto was a Jewish Ghetto located in the city of Tarnów, located approximately 70 km east from the city of Kraków. It was established for the purpose of exploitation, terror, and persecution of local Polish Jews, as well as the staging area for separating the "able workers" from those who would later be deemed unworthy of life.

== History ==
On September 8, 1939, the Germans came to occupy the city of Tarnów. Upon their arrival, the Germans immediately started capturing Jewish men in the streets, forcing them to do labor, and taking away other Jewish property. On November 9, 1939, the synagogues and other prayer houses were set ablaze, then completely destroyed. About one month later, on December 18, 1939, the Jews of Tarnów were required to hand in all valuables, such as jewelry and foreign currency, as well as wear a special patch signifying they were Jews, or they would face death. The Tarnów Ghetto was officially established in March 1941. Soon after, in June 1941, the Jewish people from the area surrounding were relocated to Tarnów. This relocation caused the population of the ghetto to rise to about 40,000 people.

== Persecution of the Jews ==
The 1st action that was taken against the Jews occurred on June 9, 1942. On this date, the Jewish people were required to report to Kaplanowka Square to fill out registration papers. They were stamped with either a “SD” if they did war work, and a “K” if they did not do any war work. People stamped with a “K” were set to be deported soon after.

Then, on the morning of June 12, 1942, men from the SS were given rations of alcohol. After consuming the alcohol, the SS men grabbed axes and went door to door to the Jewish residences. Jews found with papers stamped with a “K” or Jews who didn't have papers were either taken away or killed on the spot. Some were taken to a forest near the ghetto and were gunned down. Others were taken to Czacki school, put in a steam bath, and were choked to death from the steam.

The 2nd action was taken on July 24–25, 1942. The Jewish people were ordered out of their houses. They were required to walk barefoot to the market square, getting whipped and pushed by the butts of the Nazi's rifles. Any children in these homes were escorted to a shed nearby and were shot dead. Some of the Jews who were fit for labor were taken for the purpose of forced labor, the others were then deported to Belzec extermination camp. This action was also known as the “Children Action” because of the large number of children killed during this event.

In October 1942, the Tarnów Ghetto was split into Section A and Section B. Section A was turned into a forced labor camp split into a male division and a female division. Section B was made up of the Jewish people who didn't work or who had large families. Once a Jew was assigned to a certain section, he or she was not allowed to move sections.

Once the Jews from Section A were shipped away for labor, the Jews in Section B were told to report to the Magdeburger Platz where all their valuables were confiscated. They were then ordered to kneel down in front of the Gestapo officers while their documents were checked.

By the middle of the day, 2,500 Jews were lined up at the square and marched to the station where they were loaded into goods wagons. The train stopped one time at the Rzeszow station to pick up more wagons of Jews. The train then left for the final destination of Belzic. A select few Jewish people were able to climb through the vents and jump out of the wagon and head back to the Tarnów Ghetto.

In January 1943, the remaining 9,000 Jews left in the Tarnów Ghetto were ordered to safeguard the properties left behind by the Jews that were deported and to supervise the Jewish labor force.

A conference in mid-August 1943 was held in which it was announced that the Tarnów Ghetto would be finally liquidated in early September 1943. An end of August conference confirmed the plans for the final liquidation. 300 Jewish people, 200 men and 100 women, were to stay behind to be the cleanup crew. 600 Jews were transported to Auschwitz-Birkenau for “special treatment”, and the remained 200 Jews were transferred to Plaszow. On September 3, 1943, SS as well as other forces surrounded the Tarnów Ghetto. The Jews for Section A and the Jews from Section B went to the Magdeburger Platz. Some Jews from Section A were selected to move to the Plaszow camp to do forced labor, the rest were put into the Singer factory grounds. Many were not immediately deported. In the afternoon, Jews from the Magdeburger Platz were led to the railway station to be loaded into the goods wagons. They squeezed 160 Jews in each wagon, nailing wooden planks over the air vents. Because of this lack of ventilation, many Jews died during the trip.

On January 18, 1945, the Soviet Army entered the city of Tarnów, ending the Nazi occupation of the city.
