= Ugla Hauksdóttir =

Icelandic director and screenwriter (born 1989)

- Born: 31 July 1989 (age 36); Reykjavík, Iceland
- Occupations: Film director, screenwriter
- Years active: 2014–present
- Website: uglahauks.com

Ugla Hauksdóttir (born 31 July 1989) is an Icelandic film and television director and screenwriter. She is known for directing episodes of international productions including Hanna, Snowfall, The Power, and Alien: Earth. She also directed episodes of the Icelandic series Trapped. Her debut feature film is The Fires (Eldarnir).

== Early life and education ==
Ugla studied photography and experimental filmmaking at the Cooper Union in New York City, later earning an MFA in screenwriting and directing from Columbia University.

== Career ==
Ugla began her career directing short films, including Salt (2014), How Far She Went (2017), and Sealskin (2020).

In 2016, she received the Directors Guild of America Student Film Award in the "Best Woman Student Filmmaker" category for How Far She Went. That same year, she was named a Nordic Talent to Watch by the Nordisk Film & TV Fond and became the first Icelandic woman to join the Directors Guild of America.

She directed two episodes of Trapped in its second season, joining a production team led by Baltasar Kormákur that aimed to increase the number of women directors in Icelandic television.

Her international television work includes directing episodes of the Amazon Prime series Hanna, FX’s Snowfall, and Amazon MGM Studios’s The Power.

Ugla’s debut feature film is The Fires, adapted from the bestselling novel Eldarnir (The Fires: Love and Other Disasters) by Sigríður Hagalín Björnsdóttir. The film is produced by Netop Films (Iceland) and Madants (Poland), with international sales handled by Bankside Films.

== Filmography ==
Short film

Year	Title	Director	Writer
2014	Salt	Yes	Yes
2017	How Far She Went	Yes	Yes
2020	Sealskin	Yes	Yes

Feature film

Year	Title	Director	Writer
2025	The Fires	Yes	Yes

Television

Year	Title	Episode(s)
2019	Trapped	"Episode #2.4"
2019	Trapped	"Episode #2.7"
2020	Hanna	"Welcome Mia"
2020	Hanna	"A Way to Grieve"
2020	Hanna	"You’re With Us Now"
2021	Snowfall	"All the Way Down"
2023	The Power	"The World Is on Fu*king Fire" (Co-directed with Lisa Gunning)
2023	The Power	"A New Organ"
2023	The Power	"Scarlet Minnow" (Co-directed with Lisa Gunning)
2023	The Power	"Sparklefingers"
2025	Alien: Earth	"Observation"
2025	Alien: Earth	"The Fly"
