= Disobedience (novel) =

2006 novel by Naomi Alderman

Disobedience: A Novel
- The front cover of the first edition (hardcover)
- Author: Naomi Alderman
- Language: English
- Publisher: Penguin Books (UK); Simon & Schuster/Touchstone (US)
- Publication date: March 2006
- Publication place: United Kingdom
- Media type: Print (hardback and paperback), e-book, audiobook
- Pages: 256
- ISBN: 9780670916283

Disobedience is the debut novel by British author Naomi Alderman. First published in the UK in March 2006, the novel has since been translated into ten languages. Disobedience follows a rabbi's bisexual daughter as she returns from New York to her Orthodox Jewish community in Hendon, London. Although the subject matter was considered somewhat controversial, the novel was well received and earned Alderman the 2006 Orange Award for New Writers and the 2007 Sunday Times Young Writer of the Year Award.

== Synopsis ==
The novel is presented with both an omniscient narrator and a first-person narrative of Ronit Krushka, a 32-year-old non-practising Orthodox Jew, who is working in New York as a financial analyst and having an affair with her married male boss. The death of her estranged father, a powerful rabbi, brings Ronit back to her childhood home in Hendon, London, where her provocative ways outrage the local Orthodox Jewish community. Discovering that her cousin Dovid, who is also her father's chosen successor, is married to her former lover, Esti, forces Ronit to rethink what she left behind.

== Development ==
Similar to her protagonist Ronit, Naomi Alderman grew up in the Orthodox Jewish community in Hendon before moving to New York, and the novel is about places Alderman is familiar with. However, Alderman has said that the novel is not based on events in her life. According to Alderman, writing the novel led her to cease being a practising Jew.

== Reception ==
=== Critical response ===
The novel received mixed reviews.

According to The Telegraph's Lucy Beresford, "Despite some novelistic weaknesses, Alderman's commentary on Orthodox Judaism in the 21st century is thought-provoking and illuminating, and she has the comic's gift to assassinate from within with compassion." The New York Times' Elsa Dixler enjoyed the "acerbic and self-aware" Ronit, and concluded that: "Although the novel’s plot is somewhat creaky and its climax seems contrived, the strength of this insular congregation is clearly conveyed." The San Francisco Chronicle's Sara Peyton noted that: "at her best, Alderman provides a window into a world that appears at once strange and foreboding, revealing its human flaws as well as its spiritual beauty."

On the other hand, the novel caused some controversy in the Orthodox Jewish community. The Jewish Chronicle gave the novel a scathing review, while another Jewish paper refused to review it. Writing for The Guardian, Dina Rabinovitch, herself an Orthodox Jew, gave the novel a poor review, commenting that "this feels like writing-by-numbers" and that "[n]one of the personalities here gets beyond the two-dimensional."

=== Accolades ===
The novel earned Alderman the 2006 Orange Award for New Writers and the 2007 Sunday Times Young Writer of the Year Award. Alderman was also selected as one of the Waterstones 25 Writers for the Future. The novel was a finalist for the Jewish Book Council's 2007 Sami Rohr Prize for Jewish Literature and 2008 National Jewish Book Award for Fiction.

== Adaptations ==
A ten-part reading of an abridged serialisation of the novel was first broadcast on BBC Radio 4's Book at Bedtime in 2006. The radio adaptation was read by Sara Kestelman and Tracy-Ann Oberman.

A film adaptation of the novel, directed by Sebastián Lelio with screenplay by Lelio and playwright Rebecca Lenkiewicz, was completed in 2017. The film stars Rachel Weisz as Ronit, Rachel McAdams as Esti, and Alessandro Nivola as Dovid. It premiered at the Toronto International Film Festival on 10 September 2017 and was generally well received by critics. Disobedience received a wide release in 2018.

== Translations ==
Since its publication, Disobedience has been translated into over ten languages, including:

- Polish: Nieposłuszeństwo (Sic!, 2006: ISBN 9788360457054)
- German: Ungehorsam, translated by Christiane Buchner and Miriam Mandelkow (Berlin Verlag Taschenbuch, 2007: ISBN 9783833305528)
- Italian: Disobbedienza, translated by Maria Baiocchi (Nottetempo, 2007: ISBN 9788874521197)
- Croatian: Neposluh (Algoritam, 2007: ISBN 9789532205312)
- French: La Désobéissance, translated by Hélène Papot (Éditions d'Olivier, 2008: ISBN 9782879295381)
- Hungarian: A rabbi meg a lánya, lit. 'The Rabbi and His Daughter' (Ulpius-ház Könyvkiadó, 2010: ISBN 9789632543604)
- Portuguese: Disobediência (Saída de Emergência, 2017: ISBN 9789897730672)
- Dutch: Ongehoorzaam, translated by Auke Leistra (Atlas Contact, 2018: ISBN 9789025452711)
