= The Power (TV series) =

American-British sci-fi TV series (2023)

- Genre: Science fiction; Drama; Dystopia; Thriller
- Based on: The Power by Naomi Alderman
- Developed by: Raelle Tucker and Naomi Alderman and Claire Wilson and Sarah Quintrell
- Starring: Toni Collette; Halle Bush; Auliʻi Cravalho; Zrinka Cvitešić; Toheeb Jimoh; John Leguizamo; Ria Zmitrowicz
- Music by: Morgan Kibby
- Countries of origin: United States; United Kingdom
- Original language: English
- No. of seasons: 1
- No. of episodes: 9

Production
- Executive producers: Raelle Tucker; Jane Featherstone; Naomi de Pear; Naomi Alderman; Claire Wilson
- Producer: Sarah Wheale
- Production location: United Kingdom
- Cinematography: Colin Watkinson; Ollie Downey; Carlos Catalan; Giulio Biccari
- Editors: Beverley Mills; Fiorella Santaniello; Stephen Evans
- Running time: 54–63 minutes
- Production companies: Sister; Disobedient Productions; Angry Annie Productions; Amazon Studios

Original release
- Network: Amazon Prime Video
- Release: 31 March – 12 May 2023

The Power is an American-British science fiction drama television series developed by Raelle Tucker, Naomi Alderman, Claire Wilson, and Sarah Quintrell for Amazon Prime Video, based on Alderman's 2016 novel The Power. The series consists of nine episodes and premiered on 31 March 2023 and concluded on 12 May 2023.

== Premise ==
The world of The Power is our world, but for one twist of nature. Suddenly, and without warning, all teenage girls in the world develop the power to electrocute people at will. It's hereditary, it's inbuilt, and it can't be taken away from them. Coming alive to the thrill of pure power: the ability to hurt or even kill by releasing electrical jolts from their fingertips, they rapidly learn they can awaken the Power in older women. Soon enough nearly every woman in the world can do it. And then everything is different.

== Cast and characters ==
=== Main ===
- Toni Collette as Mayor Margot Cleary-Lopez, the mayor of Seattle and a mother of three including Jos
- Auliʻi Cravalho as Jos Cleary-Lopez, Margot's daughter
- John Leguizamo as Dr. Rob Lopez, Margot's husband
- Toheeb Jimoh as Tunde Ojo, an aspiring video journalist from Nigeria with big dreams
- Ria Zmitrowicz as Roxy Monke, the illegitimate daughter of British gangster Bernie Monke
- Halle Bush as Allie/Eve, an adoptee into an American Bible Belt couple
- Nico Hiraga as Ryan, Jos's boyfriend
- Heather Agyepong as Ndudi, Tunde's close friend
- Daniela Vega as Sister Maria, a Nun from the Sisters of Christ convent that took in Allie
- Eddie Marsan as Bernie Monke, a feared London crime boss
- Archie Rush as Darrell Monke, Bernie's youngest son & Roxy’s half brother
- Gerrison Machado as Matt Cleary-Lopez, Margot's son
- Pietra Castro as Izzy Cleary-Lopez, Margot's youngest daughter
- Zrinka Cvitešić as Tatiana Moskalev, the wife of the Moldovan president, Viktor Moskalev

=== Recurring ===
- Adina Porter as the voice in Allie's head
- Josh Charles as Daniel Dandon, the governor of Washington State and a "constant thorn in the side" of Margot Cleary-Lopez
- Edwina Findley as Helen, Margot Cleary-Lopez's highly competent and trusted advisor
- Jacob Fortune-Lloyd as Ricky Monke, Bernie's son
- Avital Lvova as Liat Monke, Ricky's wife and Bernie's daughter-in-law
- Juliet Cowan as Barbara Monke, Bernie's wife
- Ashley De Guzman as Yuki, Jos' classmate
- Ana Ularu as Zoia, Tatiana's sister
- Reese Alexander as Frank
- Alexandru Bindea as Viktor Moskalev, Tatiana's husband
- Bogdan Albulescu as General Miron, General of Moldova
- Emily Renee as Savannah
- Risteárd Cooper as Declan Bease, a reporter who works with Tundi
- Emily Kuroda as Sister Veronica, a Nun from the Sisters of Christ convent that took in Allie
- Zari-Angel Hator as Sima, one of Allie's followers
- Alli Boyer-Ybarra as Luanne, one of Allie's followers
- Graham Verchere as Urbandox, an anonymous men's rights activist
- Peyvand Sadeghian as Kimaya
- Andreea Diac as Colette
- Zoe Bullock as Gordy
- Rita Bernard-Shaw as Jade
- Samiah Khan as Talia
- Eva-Jane Willis as Sister Bianca

=== Guest ===
- Rob Delaney as Tom, a host of a shockjock news show
- Alice Eve as Kristen, a host of a shockjock news show
- Sam Buchanan as Terry Monke, Bernie's son
- Simbi Ajikawo as Adunola, Tunde's on-again/off-again girlfriend

== Episodes ==
No.	Title	Directed by	Written by	Original release date
1	"A Better Future is in Your Hands"	Logan Kibens	Naomi Alderman	March 31, 2023
2	"The World is on Fu*king Fire"	Ugla Hauksdóttir & Lisa Gunning	Claire Wilson & Sarah Quintrell	March 31, 2023
3	"A New Organ"	Ugla Hauksdóttir	Teleplay by : Raelle Tucker & Sue Chung	March 31, 2023
4	"The Day of the Girls"	Shannon Murphy & Lisa Gunning	Sarah Quintrell	April 7, 2023
5	"Scarlet Minnow"	Ugla Hauksdóttir & Lisa Gunning	Sarah Quintrell	April 14, 2023
6	"Sparklefingers"	Ugla Hauksdóttir	Teleplay by : Stacy Osei-Kuffour and Raelle Tucker & Brennan Peters	April 21, 2023
7	"Baptism"	Shannon Murphy	Claire Wilson & Sarah Quintrell	April 28, 2023
8	"Just a Girl"	Logan Kibens & Neasa Hardiman	Claire Wilson	May 5, 2023
9	"The Shape of Power"	Logan Kibens & Neasa Hardiman	Claire Wilson & Naomi Alderman & Brennan Peters	May 12, 2023

== Production ==
=== Development ===
In February 2019, it was announced that Jane Featherstone and Reed Morano would adapt the novel The Power by Naomi Alderman for Amazon. The production company Sister Pictures had previously optioned the book in 2016. Featherstone, Naomi de Pear, Alderman, Claire Wilson, and Raelle Tucker serve as executive producers, while Tim Bricknell serves as a produce. In March 2022, Morano exited the series, opting not to be credited as director and executive producer.

=== Writing ===
The series has an all-female writers room, which includes Claire Wilson, Sarah Quintrell, Whit Anderson, Stacy Osei-Kuffour, Rebecca Levene, Raelle Tucker, Sue Chung, Brennan Peters, and Michelle Hsu. Quintrell also serves as co-executive producer and story consultant.

=== Casting ===
In late October 2019, Leslie Mann was cast as Margot Cleary-Lopez. Auliʻi Cravalho was cast the next month as Jos Cleary-Lopez. In January 2020, John Leguizamo, Toheeb Jimoh, Ria Zmitrowicz, Halle Bush, Heather Agyepong, Nico Hiraga and Daniela Vega were cast. Later that month, Eddie Marsan was cast as Bernie Monke. In February, Rainn Wilson was cast as Daniel Dandon but was replaced by Tim Robbins in January 2021 due to scheduling conflicts caused by the COVID-19 pandemic. The next month, Rob Delaney, Alice Eve, Edwina Findley, Jacob Fortune-Lloyd, Sam Buchanan, Juliet Cowan, and Simbi Ajikawo were cast in recurring roles. Archie Rush, Gerrison Machado, Pietra Castro and Zrinka Cvitešić were cast as series regulars. In April, Ana Ularu was cast as Zoia. In May 2022, it was reported that Mann and Robbins had dropped out of the series. In August, it was announced that their roles would be assumed by Toni Collette and Josh Charles, respectively.

=== Filming ===
The series had been set to start production in late 2019 in the US state of Georgia but moved to Fairford and Lechlade in the south west of the UK due to a newly signed abortion law in Georgia. Filming began in early February 2020 but was paused in March due to the COVID-19 pandemic. Other shooting locations included the Crystal Palace National Sports Centre and Bawdsey, which was chosen to take the place of Toronto, where filming had been planned to occur before the pandemic. In late October 2021, the series filmed near Walvis Bay in Namibia.

Collette filmed her scenes for the series over a period of five weeks.

=== Music ===
The music for the series is composed by Morgan Kibby.

The Power (Prime Video Original Series Soundtrack)
No.	Title	Length
1.	"Roxy"	1:01
2.	"The Hour"	1:05
3.	"Eve"	1:20
4.	"A Flare"	2:45
5.	"Fireflies"	1:23
6.	"Blood on the Bar"	1:03
7.	"Burst into Flames"	1:48
8.	"Carpathia"	0:45
9.	"Deliverance?"	1:47
10.	"Kick in the Teeth"	1:27
11.	"Fix It"	2:08
12.	"No Good Deed"	1:11
13.	"Prelude"	3:10
14.	"Double Speak"	1:51
15.	"Rumors"	3:35
16.	"Girls Working"	0:29
17.	"Nostalgia"	1:27
18.	"Rebel Nuns"	2:10
19.	"Ripple 1"	2:14
20.	"New Organ"	2:03
21.	"Margot"	2:44
22.	"On the Bone"	1:34
23.	"Ignition"	3:16
24.	"Tunde"	3:10
25.	"She Shapes, She Sews"	2:44
26.	"Birthright"	1:25
27.	"Feet of Your Mother"	1:49
28.	"Glitch"	3:07
29.	"Eye 4 an Eye"	1:09
30.	"What You Get"	1:45
31.	"Skein Research"	2:00
32.	"Grain of Salt"	2:19
33.	"Footwear"	1:08
34.	"Guns + Jewels"	2:50
35.	"The Water"	2:35
36.	"In Your Eyes"	3:59
37.	"Surrender"	2:16
38.	"God's Opus"	3:28
39.	"A Cure"	4:35
40.	"You Will Need This"	1:23
41.	"New Religion"	2:17
42.	"Roots"	2:10
Total length:		88:25

== Release ==
The first three episodes premiered on Prime Video on 31 March 2023, with one new episode released each Friday until the finale on 12 May 2023.

== Reception ==
On the review aggregator website Rotten Tomatoes, The Power holds an approval rating of 74%, based on 46 critic reviews, with an average rating of 7.5/10. The website's critics consensus reads, "The Power is too ill-defined to do justice to its mighty potential, but the core idea is intriguing enough to give it a charge." Metacritic, which uses a weighted average, has assigned the series a score of 66 out of 100 based on 19 critics, indicating "generally favorable reviews".
