= Disobedience (2017 film) =

2017 film by Sebastián Lelio

- Theatrical release poster
- Directed by: Sebastián Lelio
- Screenplay by: Sebastián Lelio; Rebecca Lenkiewicz
- Based on: Disobedience by Naomi Alderman
- Produced by: Frida Torresblanco; Rachel Weisz; Ed Guiney
- Starring: Rachel Weisz; Rachel McAdams; Alessandro Nivola
- Cinematography: Danny Cohen
- Edited by: Nathan Nugent
- Music by: Matthew Herbert
- Production companies: Film4; FilmNation Entertainment; Element Pictures; LC6 Productions; Braven Films
- Distributed by: Curzon Artificial Eye (United Kingdom and Ireland); Bleecker Street (United States)
- Release dates: 10 September 2017 (TIFF); 27 April 2018 (United States); 30 November 2018 (United Kingdom)
- Running time: 114 minutes
- Countries: United Kingdom; Ireland; United States
- Language: English
- Budget: $6 million
- Box office: $8 million

Disobedience is a 2017 romantic drama film directed by Sebastián Lelio and co-written by Lelio and Rebecca Lenkiewicz, based on the 2006 novel of the same name by Naomi Alderman. Starring Rachel Weisz, Rachel McAdams, and Alessandro Nivola, the film follows Ronit Krushka (Weisz), a photographer who returns to the strict Orthodox Jewish community in North London for her father's funeral after living in New York City for many years, having been estranged from her father and ostracised by the community. After Ronit reunites with childhood friends Esti (McAdams), and Dovid Kuperman (Nivola), the repressed feelings and unresolved conflict between the two women slowly resurfaces.

Disobedience premiered at the Toronto International Film Festival on 10 September 2017, and was theatrically released in the United States on 27 April 2018, and in the United Kingdom and Ireland on 30 November 2018. The film received critical acclaim, with particular praise for the performances of the cast and Lelio's direction. It received five nominations at the British Independent Film Awards 2018, Best British Independent Film, Best Actress for Weisz, Best Supporting Actress for McAdams, Best Screenplay for Lelio and Lenkiewicz, and won Best Supporting Actor for Nivola.

== Plot ==
New York photographer Ronit Krushka, known as Ronnie in the United States, returns to her childhood home in North London after her father, the old Rav, succumbs to pneumonia. Ronit is uncomfortable seeing everyone again since she was banished from the community for behaving in a manner not conforming to Orthodox culture.

Ronit is shocked to learn that her childhood friends Dovid, a chosen disciple of her father, and Esti, are now married. Dovid invites Ronit to stay with them. They attend Shabbat dinner at her uncle Moshe's house where she is questioned by the guests about changing her name, and they tell her she should get married, because that is what is right. Ronit tells them if she had stayed in London she probably would have been married off, but she would have been suicidal.

Ronit visits Moshe at his office to discuss the disposition of her father's house and discovers her father has left all of his possessions to the synagogue. Ronit and Esti run into each other on the street while Ronit is on her way to visit her father's house. While inspecting items left in the house, Ronit becomes frustrated and expresses that she wishes to cut her trip short and return to the United States. Upset, Esti tenderly kisses Ronit, who initially resists before reciprocating. Esti confesses to having asked Ronit to be notified of her father's death out of a desire to see her again. She also reveals her unhappiness with her life choices, taken based on the Rav's advice and her strong belief in HaShem. It is revealed that Ronit and Esti were caught in a romantic tryst when they were younger, leading Ronit to leave the United Kingdom; neither has been with another woman since and Esti admits being attracted to only women.

On the way home, they stop at a nearby park and kiss again, but are spotted by a couple from the congregation. The next day Esti, who works as a teacher at the local Jewish school, is called into the headmistress' office after the couple deliver a complaint about what they saw. Meanwhile, Dovid is asked to take over the Rav's duties. Ronit tells Esti she is leaving London, and the two of them sneak away to a hotel room in central London for passionate sex.

When Esti arrives home, she turns down Dovid when he tries to initiate intimacy. She later tells him the truth about her feelings for Ronit, causing him to leave. Esti later purchases a pregnancy test and discovers she is pregnant. The next morning, Dovid calls Ronit and says that Esti is missing. They spend the day looking for her and, when they return home, Esti has come back; she asks Dovid for her freedom, stating that she wants to give her unborn child a chance to decide whether or not to be part of their community.

Ronit and Esti attend the Rav's hesped (eulogy gathering), which is to be given by Dovid. Under the guise of addressing the congregation, he releases Esti from their marriage and then publicly turns down the offer of becoming the congregation's new spiritual guide. Esti finds him outside and they embrace. Dovid motions for Ronit to join them, finally reconciling their old friendship.

Ronit departs for New York, cordially bidding Dovid and Esti goodbye. As Ronit's cab is driving away, Esti chases it down and gives her a final kiss. Ronit tells Esti that she will be a brilliant mother, and they confess their love for each other. Esti promises to let Ronit know where she goes. Before going to the airport, Ronit makes a detour to her father's grave to bid him a final goodbye after taking a picture of his grave.

== Cast ==
- Rachel Weisz as Ronit Krushka
- Rachel McAdams as Esti Kuperman
- Alessandro Nivola as Dovid Kuperman
- Bernardo Santos and Jonathan Schey as Young Dovid
- Anton Lesser as Rav Krushka
- Bernice Stegers as Fruma Hartog
- Allan Corduner as Moshe Hartog
- Nicholas Woodeson as Rabbi Goldfarb
- Liza Sadovy as Rebbetzin Goldfarb
- Clara Francis as Hinda
- Mark Stobbart as Lev
- Caroline Gruber as Hannah Shapiro
- Alexis Zegerman as Rivka

== Production ==
=== Development ===
On 29 September 2016, it was reported that Rachel Weisz was set to produce and star in an adaptation of the Naomi Alderman novel Disobedience; with Ed Guiney and Frida Torresblanco as co-producers, and Sebastián Lelio directing from a script by Lelio and Rebecca Lenkiewicz. On 4 October 2016, Rachel McAdams joined the cast, followed by Alessandro Nivola as McAdams's husband on 7 December 2016. The film was co-financed by Film4 Productions and FilmNation Entertainment. Matthew Herbert joined the production to compose the film score.

=== Filming ===
Principal photography on the Irish-British-American production began on 3 January 2017. Filming locations in London included Golders Green, Cricklewood and Hendon.

== Release ==
In May 2017, Curzon Artificial Eye acquired U.K. distribution rights from FilmNation Entertainment, and international distribution rights were acquired by Roadshow (Australia), Mars Films (France), Cinema SRL (Italy), Lev Films (Israel), Pathé (Switzerland), and Sony Pictures Worldwide Acquisitions for various territories. Bleecker Street acquired the U.S. distribution rights in September 2017, and Mongrel Media acquired the rights for Canada.

Disobedience had its world premiere at the Toronto International Film Festival on 10 September 2017. The film premiered in the United States at the Tribeca Film Festival in the Spotlight Narrative section on 24 April 2018. The film was released theatrically in the U.S. as a limited release on 27 April 2018, in Australia on 14 June and on 30 November in the United Kingdom.

== Reception ==
=== Box office ===
Disobedience grossed $3.5 million in the United States and Canada, and $4.5 million in other territories, for a worldwide total of $8.0 million.

The film debuted in five cinemas in New York City and Los Angeles and made $241,276 in its opening weekend (a per-venue average of $48k), ranking as the fourth-best opening average for the year to that point, after Isle Of Dogs ($60k), Avengers: Infinity War ($55k) and Black Panther ($50k).

=== Critical response ===
On review aggregator website Rotten Tomatoes, the film holds an approval rating of 84% based on 209 reviews, and an average rating of 7.20/10. The website's critical consensus states, "Disobedience explores a variety of thought-provoking themes, bolstered by gripping work from leads Rachel Weisz, Rachel McAdams, and Alessandro Nivola." On Metacritic, the film has a weighted average score of 74 out of 100, based on 38 critics, indicating "generally favorable" reviews.

Andrew Barker of Variety gave the film a positive review, writing that Disobedience "may not catapult Lelio beyond the arthouse world, but it's yet another triumph in what's shaping up to be a major career." David Rooney of The Hollywood Reporter also gave the film a positive review writing, "Beautifully acted by Rachel Weisz, Rachel McAdams and Alessandro Nivola as the three points of a melancholy romantic triangle, this is a deeply felt drama that exerts a powerful grip."

Writing for Rolling Stone, Peter Travers gave the film 3.5 stars out of 4, describing it as "a gorgeously acted, written and directed spellbinder ... that never preaches or judges. Without dialogue, Lelio creates a whole world that can be read eloquently and movingly on the faces of two superb actresses who give unstintingly to its creation."

David Ehrlich from IndieWire praised the importance of the subject, the outstanding acting and good direction, saying, "A fraught and emotionally nuanced love story about the tension between the life we're born into and the one we want for ourselves ... Both Weisz and McAdams do a phenomenal job of negotiating who their characters are versus who their characters feel as though they have to be ... Lelio builds to a beautiful and powerfully ambiguous moment that brings all the major characters together."

Peter Bradshaw from The Guardian praised the performances, direction, and score saying, "Rachel Weisz, Rachel McAdams and Alessandro Nivola are at the top of their game ... The drama is expertly controlled by Lelio, lit and shot in muted and subdued colour tones by cinematographer Danny Cohen and it has a very interesting musical score by Matthew Herbert ... This is richly satisfying and powerfully acted work."

=== Accolades ===
Award	Date of ceremony	Category	Recipient/nominee	Result	Ref
British Independent Film Awards	2 December 2018	Best British Independent Film	Sebastián Lelio, Rebecca Lenkiewicz, Frida Torresblanco, Ed Guiney, Rachel Weisz	Nominated	
British Independent Film Awards	2 December 2018	Best Screenplay	Sebastián Lelio / Rebecca Lenkiewicz	Nominated	
British Independent Film Awards	2 December 2018	Best Actress	Rachel Weisz	Nominated	
British Independent Film Awards	2 December 2018	Best Supporting Actor	Alessandro Nivola	Won	
British Independent Film Awards	2 December 2018	Best Supporting Actress	Rachel McAdams	Nominated	

== See also ==
- The Secrets (film)
- Red Cow (film)
- Eyes Wide Open (film)
