= Lisa Gunning =

British film editor, director, writer

Lisa Gunning is an English film director, editor and writer.

== Life and career ==
She began her career in the 1990s, following her graduation from University College London, where she studied English. In 1998, she met director Anthony Minghella while working on a spot for Comic Relief. Their long-running collaboration began with an adaptation of the theatrical short Play as part of the Samuel Beckett season for Channel 4, on which she served as editor. After working on some musical sequences in The Talented Mr. Ripley, her first feature as editor was Minghella's Breaking and Entering in 2006, followed by his pilot for the TV series The No.1 Ladies Detective Agency.

She went on to work as an editor with John Madden on crime thriller Killshot, Salmon Fishing in the Yemen for Lasse Hallström and Seven Psychopaths for Martin McDonagh. Gunning has also collaborated extensively with artist and filmmaker Sam Taylor-Wood on her BAFTA Award-winning short film Love You More, her first feature film Nowhere Boy and her adaptation of Fifty Shades of Grey.

Gunning was in a relationship with Goldfrapp frontwoman Alison Goldfrapp. In 2013, she wrote, directed and edited a thirty minute film for the band based on five stories from their album Tales of Us. The film was streamed to over 400 cinemas across the world in March 2014 and won the award of Best Music Video at the 2014 Byron Bay International Film Festival.

In 2021 Gunning directed three episodes of The Power for Amazon Prime Video, based on Naomi Alderman's book of the same name.
