= The Walk (podcast) =

Fiction podcast by Naomi Alderman

The Walk is an interactive fiction podcast created by Naomi Alderman and produced by Panoply Media that debuted in 2018.

== Background ==
The podcast debuted on January 18, 2018, and released episodes every Tuesday and Thursday for four months for a total of 31 episodes. The show was produced by Panoply Media in partnership with the NHS and Department of Health. The creator of the podcast was Naomi Alderman, who had previously worked on Zombies, Run! which also contained interactive storytelling.

The protagonist of the show is the listener, who is supposed to walk as the story progresses. The story begins when you are handed a package at a cafe in Inverness and are told that the future of the world depends on you. The package is supposed to be delivered to Edinburgh, however, you are being pursued by both the police and a terrorist organization.

The show was the 23rd most downloaded podcast started in 2018 on Apple Podcasts.
