= Irene Sabatini =

Zimbabwean writer

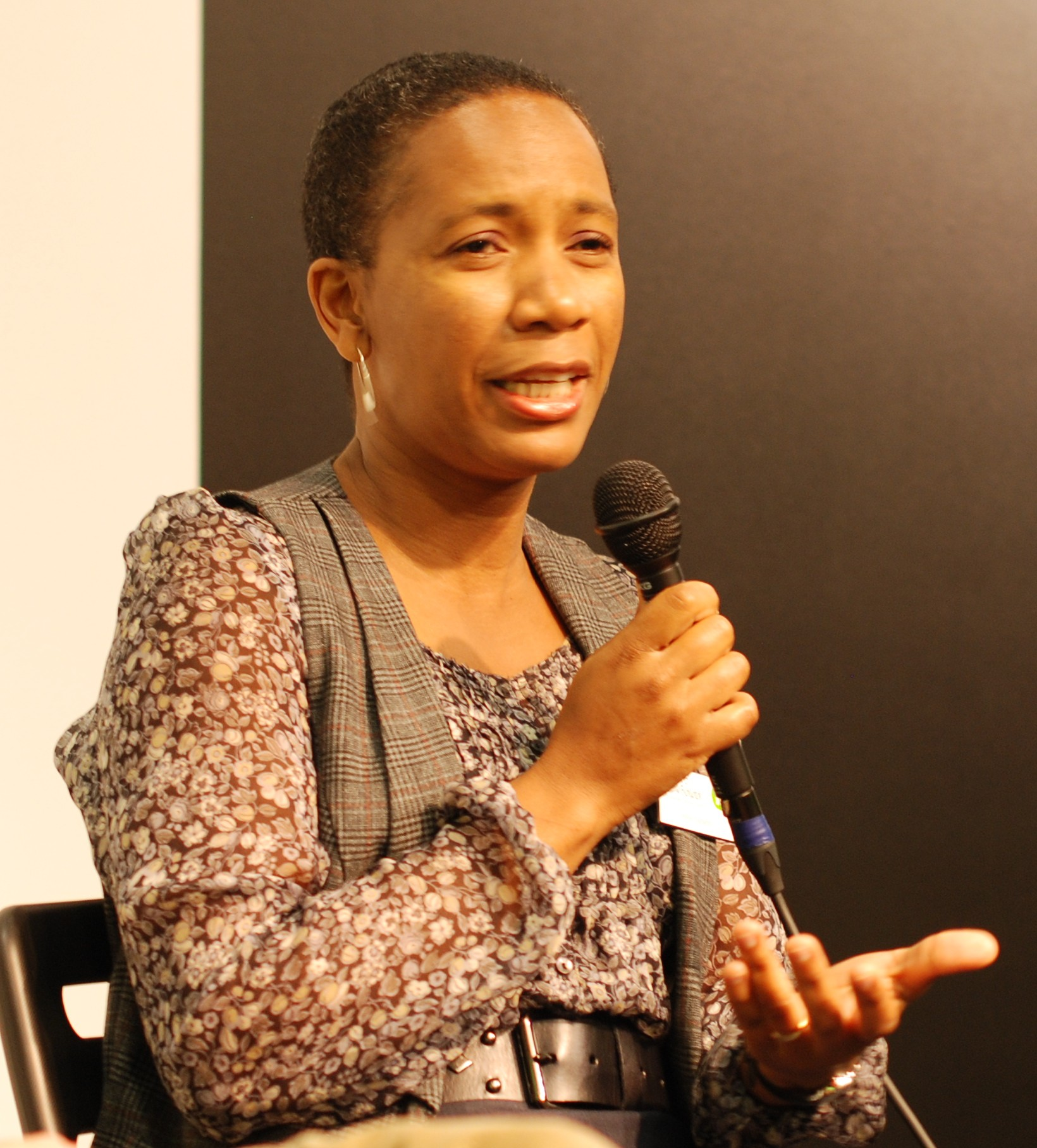
- Born: Hwange, Zimbabwe
- Writing career
- Genre: Novels
- Website: www.irenesabatini.com

Irene Sabatini is an author from Zimbabwe who writes fiction. She earned the Orange Award for New Writers (part of the Women's Prize for Fiction) in 2010 for her first novel, The Boy Next Door, a love story set against the backdrop of racism and political turmoil of 1980s Zimbabwe. Her second novel, Peace and Conflict, covers family and political history through the eyes of a ten-year-old boy.

== Biography ==
Sabatini was born in Hwange, Zimbabwe, and grew up in Bulawayo, the country's second-largest city. She attended Catholic school there and was educated by nuns. She attended the University of Zimbabwe in Harare, where she was introduced to feminism and political action during her degree in philosophy. Sabatini later earned a master's degree in child development from the Institute of Education at University College London. She has also done work and research in Bogotá and Barbados, and currently resides in Geneva, Switzerland.

== Bibliography ==
- The Boy Next Door (2009)
- Peace and Conflict (2014)
