= Frida Torresblanco =

Frida Torresblanco is a film, television, and documentary producer based in New York City. She has produced The Dancer Upstairs, The Assassination of Richard Nixon, Disobedience and Pan's Labyrinth. In 2002, Torresblanco launched a New York-based film production company, Esperanto Filmoj, in partnership with Alfonso Cuarón. She produced Cronicas, The Possibility of Hope and Rudo y Cursi.

== Early life and career ==
She co-produced Pan's Labyrinth.

In 2020, ViacomCBS International Studios announced it had ordered, from Jill Offman (66 Media) and Torresblanco, a drama series on the life of Artemisia Gentileschi, based on Mary Garrard's Artemisia Gentileschi: The Image of the Female Hero in Italian Baroque Art (Princeton: Princeton University Press, 1989), ISBN 9780691002859.

Also in 2020, ViacomCBS Networks Intl., started development on a TV series about the life of Spanish designer Cristóbal Balenciaga. Torresblanco serving as executive producer and James Kent as director.

In 2022, Paramount+ announced a new series, produced by Torresblanco and John Leguizamo, about Emma Coronel Aispuro and her path to becoming the wife of former drug lord, Joaquín "El Chapo" Guzmán.

In 2024, Torresblanco co-founded Hangtime International Pictures. The company would later join the production team for season 2 of The Night Manager.

== Filmography ==
- 1992 Christopher Columbus: The Discovery
- 2001 Gaudi Afternoon
- 2001 Girl from Rio
- 2001 Rain
- 2001 Off Key
- 2002 The Dancer Upstairs
- 2004 Duck Season
- 2004 Crónicas
- 2004 The Assassination of Richard Nixon
- 2005 Black Sun
- 2006 Pan's Labyrinth
- 2007 The Possibility of Hope
- 2007 The Shock Doctrine
- 2007 Year of the Nail
- 2008 Rudo y Cursi
- 2010 Locked In
- 2013 Magic Magic
- 2017 Disobedience
- 2019 Boléro
- 2020 The Roads Not Taken
- 2020 Karnawal
- 2020 Fatima
- 2020 Greencard
- 2021 Man in the Attic
