= The Fires =

2025 film by Ugla Hauksdóttir

- Icelandic: Eldarnir
- Directed by: Ugla Hauksdóttir
- Written by: Sigríður Hagalín Björnsdóttir; Markus Englmair; Ugla Hauksdóttir
- Starring: Vigdís Hrefna Pálsdóttir; Pilou Asbæk; Ingvar Sigurðsson
- Music by: Herdís Stefánsdóttir
- Release date: 2025
- Country: Iceland
- Language: Icelandic

The Fires (Icelandic: Eldarnir) is a 2025 Icelandic thriller film, directed by Ugla Hauksdóttir. It is based on the book Eldarnir - Ástin og aðrar hamfarir by Sigríður Hagalín Björnsdóttir and stars Vigdís Hrefna Pálsdóttir og Pilou Asbæk. The film released on 11 September 2025. The story has uncanny parallels to the series of volcanoes on Reykjanes Peninsula, although they began after the book was published.

== Cast ==
- Vigdís Hrefna Pálsdóttir - Anna
- Pilou Asbæk
- Ingvar Sigurðsson - Örn
- Jóhann Jóhannsson - Kristinn
- Þór Tulinius - Jóhannes
- Arndís Hrönn Egilsdóttir - Sigríður
- Sigurður Sigurjónsson - Ragnar
- Jörundur Ragnarsson - Stefán

== Plot ==
Anna is a geophysicist. A volcano erupts offshore causing flights to be cancelled. The authorities wish to calm the public, but Anna is worried this is just the beginning of a new series of volcanoes. Anna has an unsatisfying marriage and a photographer Thomas becomes rather friendly with her. A volcano erupts on the Reykjanes Peninsula, and is considered to have tourist potential, but Anna warns of the danger. Anna's husband suspects that she is having too much fun with the Thomas. Anna has a new hypothesis about the volcanic systems, that they are more unpredictable. Anna tells her husband that she is having an affair with Thomas. A large earthquake causes alarm. Anna wants to declare a state of emergency. However the authorities do not want to evacuate 30,000 locals and 20,000 tourists. Thomas tells Anna he will be leaving Iceland, so she walks out on him. While driving away, a rift opens and her car and a tourist bus crash into it. Anna now believes the capital city is in danger, but she cannot call her husband to warn him. A volcano erupts in a lake near the city. Anna goes to the evacuation centre, but learns her daughter went home. She goes through clouds of ash to find her house on fire, but her daughter still alive in the basement.
