= Sigríður Hagalín Björnsdóttir =

Icelandic author and journalist

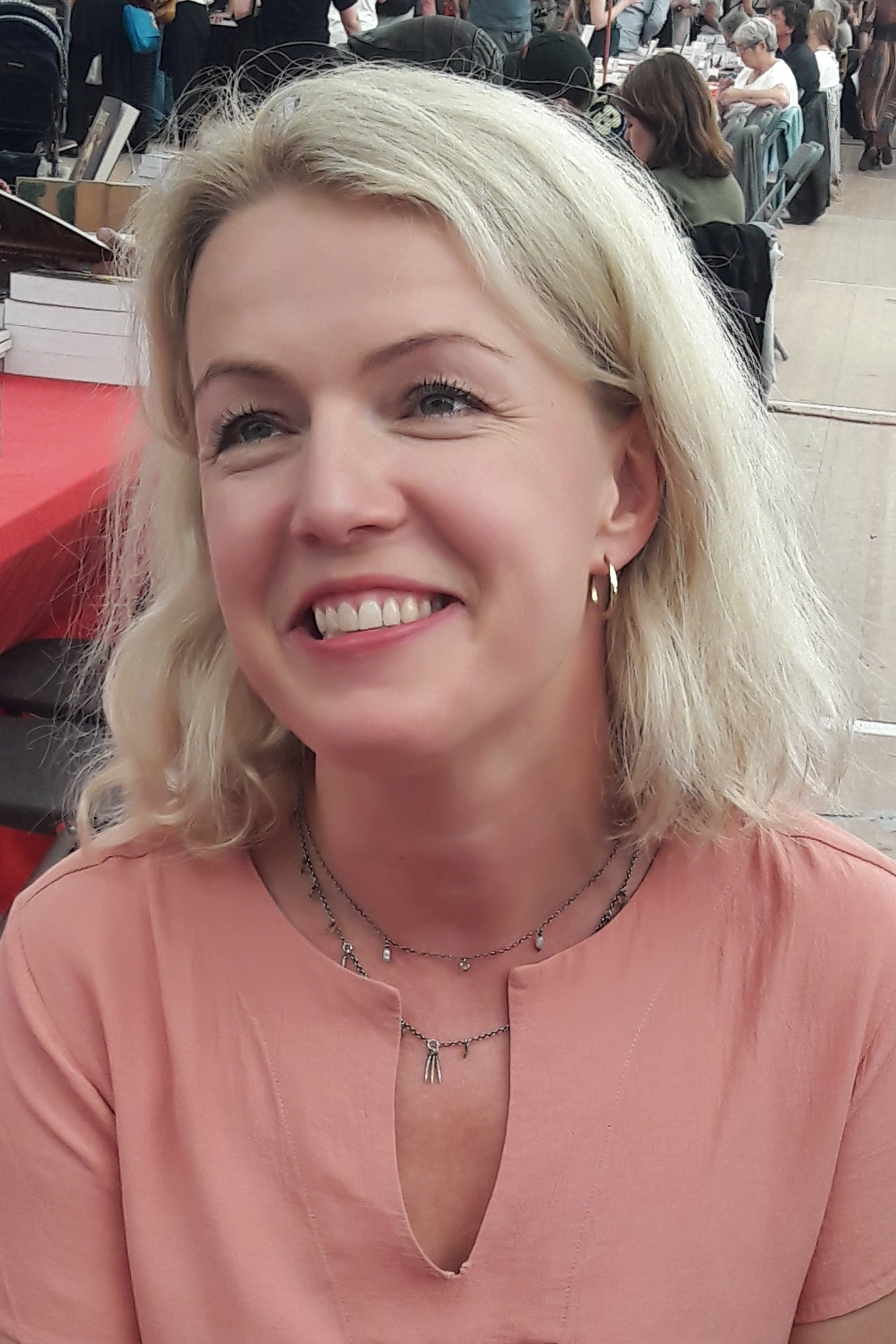
- Born: 11 February 1974 (age 52); Reykjavík, Iceland
- Occupation: author
- Spouse: Jón Kalman Stefánsson

Sigríður Hagalín Björnsdóttir (born 11 February 1974) is an Icelandic author and journalist. She is best known for her novels, such as The Fires (2020), which was made into a feature film in 2025.

== Career ==
Sigríður was born in Reykjavík and studied history and Spanish literature at the University of Iceland and in Salamanca. She later studied journalism at Columbia University in New York. Since 1999, she has worked as a journalist at RÚV, the national public-service broadcaster in Iceland. She has held various posts there, including news reporter from Copenhagen, and Assistant News Director.

Sigríður published her first novel, the dystopian Eyland, in 2016 to critical praise, and was nominated for the Fjöruverðlaun Award as well as the DV Culture Award. In 2022, her novel, Hamingja þessa heims, was nominated for the Icelandic Literary Prize. Her books have been translated into several languages, including English, French, German, Polish, Czech, and Hungarian.

Her novel The Fires was made into a feature film, directed by Ugla Hauksdóttir, that opened in 2025. The novel itself, which takes place during a catastrophic volcanic eruption on the Reykjanes peninsula, has been called "prescient", since eruptions began in that area, previously dormant for more than 800 years, only four months after the novel was published in 2020.

She is married to the author Jón Kalman Stefánsson. Her maternal grandmother was the actress Sigríður Hagalín.

== Novels ==
- Eyland (Island, 2016)
- Hið heilaga orð (The Holy Word, 2018)
- Eldarnir (The Fires, 2020)
- Hamingja þessa heims (The Fortune of this World: A Knight's Tale, 2022)
- Deus (2023)
- Vegur allrar veraldar (The Ways of All the World, 2025)
