= The Future (Alderman novel) =

2023 science fiction novel by Naomi Alderman

- Author: Naomi Alderman
- Genre: Satire, science fiction
- Publisher: Simon & Schuster
- Publication date: 7 November 2023
- Pages: 416
- ISBN: 978-1-668-02568-0

The Future is a 2023 science fiction novel by English writer Naomi Alderman, published by Simon & Schuster. The novel is set in a future dystopia where the world has been altered by environmental crisis and a powerful technocracy.

The book received mostly positive reviews from critics, including a starred review from Kirkus Reviews. Niall Harrison of Locus gave the novel a mixed review, writing that "a novel with an interesting argument. But I did just occasionally feel that I was watching the urge to imagine the metaphorical wedding sabotage the suspense of the journey." Stephanie Merritt of The Guardian wrote, "Alderman moves easily between an ironic, comic register and more reflective asides. She writes with warmth and wisdom; beyond the entertaining action sequences and the sci-fi gadgets, she posits an alternative future that acknowledges both our human weaknesses and our resilience."
