= Ria Zmitrowicz =

British actress

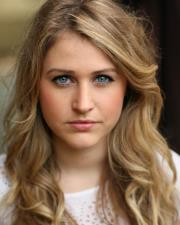
- Zmitrowicz in 2012
- Born: Spain
- Occupation: Actress
- Years active: 2010–present

Ria Zmitrowicz is a British actress. She is known for her work in theatre, earning WhatOnStage and Manchester Theatre Award nominations, and her role in the BBC drama Three Girls (2017).

== Early life and education ==
Zmitrowicz was born in Spain and grew up in Berkshire, Surrey, and Hampshire. She attended the Sixth Form College, Farnborough.

She joined the National Youth Theatre (NYT) at sixteen and moved to London when she was eighteen.

== Career ==
=== Theatre ===
Playwright and actor Luke Barnes, whom Zmitrowicz met through the NYT, cast her in his play Chapel Street, which premiered at The Old Red Lion, Islington before going on to play at the Edinburgh Fringe Festival and the Bush Theatre. This helped Zmitrowicz secure an agent. She then landed a role in Arinzé Kene's God's Property alongside Kingsley Ben-Adir at Soho Theatre.

In 2015, she played Chloe Coverly in Arcadia with the English Touring Theatre and Mary Warren in The Crucible at the Royal Exchange, Manchester. The latter earned her a nomination at the Manchester Theatre Awards. She also appeared in Four Minutes Twelve Seconds.

In 2019 she starred in the plays Three Sisters with Pearl Chanda and Patsy Ferran and The Doctor with Juliet Stevenson at the Almeida Theatre, as well as The Welkin with Maxine Peake at the National Theatre in 2020. Her performance as Sami in The Doctor, a role she originated, earned Zmitrowicz a WhatsOnStage Award nomination for Best Supporting Actress in a Play. She returned to the Royal Court in 2022, starring in The Glow.

=== Film and television ===
In 2013, she played Wilma Grey in the two-part ITV crime drama Murder on the Home Front. She also had a recurring role as Jodie in the E4 comedy-drama series Youngers. The following year, she joined the cast of the sitcom The Midnight Beast as Hope for its second series, also on E4, and the ITV period drama Mr Selfridge as Sarah Ellis, a recurring role she would play for the latter three series.

Zmitrowicz made her feature film debut with a small role in the 2015 film Kill Your Friends.

She starred as Amber Bowen, one of the titular victims, in the BAFTA-winning three-part BBC One miniseries Three Girls, based on a true story with the names changed.

In 2018 Zmitrowicz was named a Breakthrough Brit in the BAFTA awards.

She plays Roxy Monke in the 2023 Amazon Prime adaptation of Naomi Alderman's science fiction novel The Power.

== Filmography ==
=== Film ===
Year	Title	Role	Notes
2010	Tearaway	Gemma	Short films
2011	Hard to Say	Kayley	Short films
2012	Pants	Billy	Short films
2014	Pretty Bitch	Louise	Short films
2014	Two Seas	Lauren	Short films
2014	Some Candid Observation on the Eve of the End of the World	Karen	Short films
2014	The Longing	Elizabeth	Short films
2014	Mustard	Penelope	Short films
2015	Kill Your Friends	Songbird Chantelle	
2017	Bad Drawings	Grace	Short film
2018	Entebbe	Jan Almog	
2018	Jellyfish	Nightclub Girl	
2018	Teen Spirit	Hayley	
2018	Futures	Rosie	Short film
2020	Misbehaviour	Mair	
2021	The Booker Prizes 2021: Great Circle	Storyteller	Short film

=== Television ===
Year	Title	Role	Notes
2012	Whitechapel	Sasha Lowood	Episode #3.5
2013	Murder on the Home Front	Wilma Grey	Television film
2013–2014	Youngers	Jodie	10 episodes
2014	Casualty	Emily Gambol	Episode: "Brothers at Arms"
2014	The Midnight Beast	Hope	Main role; Series 2, 5 episodes
2014	Playhouse Presents	Hayley	Episode: "Nightshift"
2014–2016	Mr Selfridge	Miss Ellis	9 episodes
2017	Three Girls	Amber Bowen	Mini-series; 3 episodes
2018	On the Edge	Aimee Thomas	Mini-series; 1 episode: "Through the Gates"
2020	The Third Day: Autumn		Special 12-hour long live stream episode
2021	Foresight	Ava (voice)	Mini-series; 1 episode: "They Heard Him Shout Allahu Akbar"
2023	The Power	Roxy Monke	Main cast; 7 episodes
2024	Sherwood	Lisa Waters	Series 2, 6 episodes

== Stage ==
Year	Title	Role	Notes
2012	Skanky	Kate	Arcola Theatre, London
2012	Cortae		Talawa Theatre Company
2012	Chapel Street	Kirsty	Underbelly, Edinburgh Fringe Festival / Bush Theatre, London
2013	God's Property	Holly	Soho Theatre, London
2015	Arcadia	Chloe Coverly	Theatre Royal, Brighton / UK tour
2015	The Crucible	Mary Warren	Royal Exchange, Manchester
2015	Four Minutes Twelve Seconds	Cara	Trafalgar Studios / Hampstead Theatre, London
2016	X	Mattie	Royal Court Theatre, London
2017	Plastic	Jessica	Ustinov Studio, Bath
2017	Bad Roads	Journalist	Royal Court Theatre, London
2018	Gundog	Becky	Royal Court Theatre, London
2018	Dance Nation	Zuzu	Almeida Theatre, London
2019	Three Sisters	Irnina Sergeyevna	Almeida Theatre, London
2019	The Doctor	Sami	Almeida Theatre, London
2020	The Welkin	Sally Poppy	Royal National Theatre, London
2022	The Glow	The Woman	Royal Court Theatre Downstairs, London

== Awards and nominations ==
Year	Award	Category	Work	Result	Ref.
2015	Manchester Theatre Awards	Actress In A Supporting Role	The Crucible	Nominated	
2020	WhatsOnStage Awards	Best Supporting Actress in a Play	The Doctor	Nominated	
