= Hanna (TV series) =

2019 American action drama streaming television series

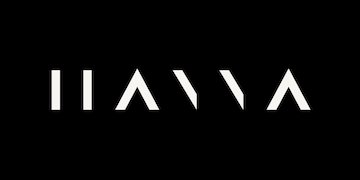
- Genre: Action; Drama
- Created by: David Farr
- Based on: Hanna by: Seth Lochhead; & David Farr
- Starring: Esme Creed-Miles; Mireille Enos; Joel Kinnaman; Noah Taylor; Dermot Mulroney; Ray Liotta
- Composers: Ben Salisbury; Geoff Barrow
- Country of origin: United States
- Original language: English
- No. of seasons: 3
- No. of episodes: 22

Production
- Executive producers: David Farr; JoAnn Alfano; Tom Coan; Andrew Woodhead; Tim Bevan; Eric Fellner; Marty Adelstein; Becky Clements; Scott Nemes
- Producer: Hugh Warren
- Cinematography: Dana Gonzales
- Editor: Morten Højbjerg
- Camera setup: Single-camera
- Running time: 44–57 minutes
- Production companies: NBCUniversal International Studios; Tomorrow Studios; Working Title Television; Focus Features; Amazon Studios

Original release
- Network: Amazon Prime Video
- Release: February 3, 2019 – November 24, 2021

Hanna is an American action drama television series, based on the 2011 film of the same name, for Amazon Prime Video. The series was created and written by David Farr and stars Esme Creed-Miles and Mireille Enos. The first episode was made available on Amazon Prime Video as a time-limited preview on February 3, 2019. The full eight-episode first season was released on March 29, 2019, and the second season was released on July 3, 2020. In July 2020, the series was renewed for a third and final season. It premiered on November 24, 2021.

== Premise ==
Hanna is a 15-year-old girl living with Erik, the only man she has ever known as her father, in a remote part of a forest in Poland. Erik once recruited pregnant women into a CIA program, code name UTRAX, where the children's DNA was enhanced in order to create super-soldiers. When Erik falls in love with Johanna, Hanna's mother, he rescues baby Hanna and they flee. The CIA then orders their on-site agent, Marissa, to shut down the project and eliminate all the babies.

== Cast and characters ==
=== Main ===
- Esme Creed-Miles as Hanna, a girl who was part of the UTRAX program as an infant but was rescued by Erik Heller, who raised and trained her on his own
- Mireille Enos as Marissa Wiegler, the CIA operative put in charge of the UTRAX program, who turns from a foe to an ally and mother figure to Hanna
- Joel Kinnaman as Erik Heller (season 1; guest, season 3), a former CIA operative who worked for UTRAX but rescued Hanna after falling in love with her mother
- Noah Taylor as Dr. Roland Kunek (season 1), a scientist who designed the regimen for the young agents in the revived UTRAX-REGENESIS program, launched after the original UTRAX program's test infants were incinerated
- Dermot Mulroney as John Carmichael (seasons 2–3), the CIA operative at the helm of both UTRAX programs
- Ray Liotta as Gordon Evans / The Chairman (season 3), the head of Pioneer and the man pulling the strings behind both UTRAX programs

=== Recurring ===
==== CIA ====
- Khalid Abdalla as Jerome Sawyer (season 1)
- Justin Salinger as Carl Meisner (seasons 1, 3)
- Andy Nyman as Jacobs (season 1)
- Anthony Welsh as Leo Garner (season 2), a supervisor at The Meadows who is responsible for indoctrinating the UTRAX-REGENESIS trainees, who are joined later by Hanna
- Cherrelle Skeete as Terri Miller (seasons 2–3), a new transfer who is in charge of using social media interaction to cultivate trainees at The Meadows
- Katie Clarkson-Hill as Joanne McCoy (season 2), a CIA officer who works under Carmichael at The Meadows
- Chloe Pirrie as Brianna Stapleton (season 3), the new CIA supervisor at The Meadows, and The Chairman's primary lieutenant
- Gabriel Akuwudike as Max Kaplan (season 3), a CIA programmer who worked on programming for Pioneer in the early days whom Marissa tracks down

==== England ====
- Rhianne Barreto as Sophie (season 1), Hanna's new friend whose family Hanna meets in Morocco

==== France ====
- Adam Bessa as Abbas Nazir (season 3), Hanna's first target upon graduating from The Meadows, whom Hanna becomes attracted to.

==== Germany ====
- Stefan Rudolf as Rudi (season 1)
- Katharina Heyer as Elsa (season 1)
- Peter Ferdinando as Lucas (season 1)
- Benno Fürmann as Dieter (season 1)

==== Poland ====
- Joanna Kulig as Johanna Petrescu (season 1; guest, season 3), Hanna's mother

==== UTRAX ====
- Yasmin Monet Prince as Girl 249 / Clara Mahan (seasons 1–2), a trainee created in the UTRAX-REGENESIS program, who escapes with Hanna from the UTRAX facility
- Áine Rose Daly as Girl 242 / Sandy Phillips, a trainee created in the UTRAX-REGENESIS program who is transferred from the UTRAX facility to the Meadows
- Gianna Kiehl as Jules Allen (seasons 2–3), a trainee created in the UTRAX-REGENESIS program who is at the Meadows facility, where she befriends Sandy

=== Guest ===
==== CIA and UTRAX ====
- Michelle Duncan as False Marissa (season 1, 3)
- Varada Sethu as CIA Analyst McArthur (season 1)
- Andrea Deck as Carlsson (season 1)
- Emma D'Arcy as Sonia Richter (season 2), a new addition to Marissa's Paris office, but she is actually working for Carmichael

==== Austria ====
- Wiebke Frost as Lena Behr (season 3), a woman who owns a remote cabin the Austrian countryside, who takes in and hides Abbas Nazir
- Léann Hamon as Nadiya (season 3), Abbas Nazir's daughter

==== England ====
- Lyndsey Marshal as Rachel (season 1), Sophie's mother
- Phaldut Sharma as Tom (season 1), Sophie's father

==== Germany ====
- Ursula Werner as Sara Heller (season 1), Erik Heller's mother
- Narges Rashidi as Sima (season 1), Dieter's wife

== Episodes ==
Season	Episodes		Originally released
1	8	1	February 3, 2019
1	8	7	March 29, 2019
2	8		July 3, 2020
3	6		November 24, 2021

=== Season 1 (2019) ===
No. overall	No. in season	Title	Directed by	Written by	Original release date
1	1	"Forest"	Sarah Adina Smith	David Farr	February 3, 2019
15 years after Erik Heller rescues baby Hanna from a covert Romanian facility, the two live deep in the Polish forest. Erik trained Hanna to be an incredible killer and hunter. Yet, keen to grow beyond the boundaries of her isolated world, she begins to venture away from home. This attracts the attention of CIA agent Marissa Wiegler, who has hunted Hanna since birth.
2	2	"Friend"	Sarah Adina Smith	David Farr	March 29, 2019
Following her capture by Marissa's men, Hanna must fight to escape from the Moroccan CIA facility and join Erik in Berlin. Along the way, she meets Sophie, a British teenager on holiday with her family, who gives Hanna her first proper taste of the real world and the thrill of adolescence. Yet despite this glimpse at normality, the threat of Marissa and her operatives is never far behind.
3	3	"City"	Jon Jones	David Farr	March 29, 2019
Hanna and Erik are reunited in Berlin, where they hide out with his old army friends and she learns more about her father's past. However, Hanna continues to long for the normal life she glimpsed with Sophie and becomes increasingly frustrated at the restrictions her own father imposes on her. Sensing Marissa is closing in on them, Erik and his friends begin to prepare for an attack.
4	4	"Father"	Jon Jones	David Farr	March 29, 2019
Erik is holding Marissa prisoner, trying to negotiate a deal to get him and Hanna safely out of Berlin. Meanwhile, Hanna hides out with Dieter and his family. Desperate to know more about what her father is up to, Hanna discovers a huge secret in her own past. Marissa explains to Erik that his rescue of Hanna ended the UTRAX program, and that she incinerated all the remaining infants in the program. As an escape plan begins to form, Marissa attempts to make her own.
5	5	"Town"	Amy Neil	Ingeborg Topsoe	March 29, 2019
Still reeling from her revelations about Erik, Hanna hides out in suburban London with Sophie, who is keeping her new friend secret from her parents. Sophie persuades Hanna to attend a school party where Hanna experiences the thrill of a teenage crush for the first time. Meanwhile, Erik's friends desperately try to save him from the life-threatening injuries he sustained fleeing capture. Marissa is sent back to psychiatric counselling, which she had needed after she followed orders and incarcerated the test infants of the UTRAX program.
6	6	"Mother"	Amy Neil	David Farr	March 29, 2019
Sophie and Hanna's relationship begins to turn sour over their shared interest in Anton. In the fallout from this argument, Marissa arrives at Sophie's house pretending to be Hanna's mother. Hanna finds herself torn between endangering Sophie and her family, or giving up her own freedom and going with Marissa. Marissa is increasingly empathetic towards Hanna. Erik is brutally interrogated by Sawyer and his men. Erik learns that the CIA ran a new UTRAX-REGENESIS program, with multiple girls just months younger than Hanna in training. He rescues Hanna from being handed over to the UTRAX operatives; during the escape, Marissa and Hanna both pause when they have their guns aimed at each other.
7	7	"Road"	Anders Engström	David Farr	March 29, 2019
Realising that Hanna will no longer accept anything but the full truth, Erik takes her back to Romania so she can learn more about her past. Meanwhile, Marissa begins to sense that Sawyer has not been telling her the full truth about UTRAX, including its revival under UTRAX-REGENESIS.
8	8	"Utrax"	Anders Engström	David Farr	March 29, 2019
When Erik reveals to Hanna the truth about UTRAX, she is determined to take action. Meanwhile, Marissa attempts to find out from Sawyer what has really been going on at the facility. Erik and Hanna attempt to rescue UTRAX-REGENESIS trainees from the UTRAX facility, however, they manage to convince only one trainee, Clara, to escape with them. They managed to escape the facility with help from Clara, but Erik succumbs to his injuries.

=== Season 2 (2020) ===
No. overall	No. in season	Title	Directed by	Written by	Original release date
9	1	"Safe"	Eva Husson	David Farr	July 3, 2020
As Hanna hides Clara in the vast forest of Northern Romania, the remaining trainees are transferred to an educational facility called The Meadows, where they are assigned new identities and encouraged to socialize with each other. Marissa sets about finding Clara by posing as her mother online. She lures her to a hotel in Bucharest, where she is ambushed and captured by Utrax. Hanna follows and is reunited with Marissa.
10	2	"The Trial"	Eva Husson	David Farr	July 3, 2020
Marissa and Hanna return to Paris, and Clara is re-introduced to the group at The Meadows. Her rebellious nature causes problems, so Terri is tasked with persuading her to follow the programme. Pursuing Clara, Hanna finds the pharmaceutical company behind the Utrax medical implants and takes part in a drug trial. She discovers that the drugs are bound for the trainees at The Meadows.
11	3	"To The Meadows"	Eva Husson	Paul Waters	July 3, 2020
Hanna returns to Passway Pharmaceuticals and follows Louis Dumont and the drugs out of the city, aware that this will lead her to The Meadows. Marissa discovers that Sonia is in Belgium and reaches Hanna just in time, killing Sonia in the process. Hanna arrives at The Meadows, ready to save Clara, but is shocked to discover that Terri's plans to get through to Clara have worked. Clara appears to have settled in.
12	4	"Welcome Mia"	Ugla Hauksdóttir	Laura Lomas	July 3, 2020
Marissa joins Hanna at The Meadows, assuring her that she is on her side by arranging an escape plan for that evening. Hanna convinces Clara to join them, but the familial community of The Meadows proves too comforting for her, and she betrays Hanna, putting the power back in Carmichael's hands. Meanwhile, CIA operative Mannion finds The Meadows, but there is no sign of Hanna or Marissa.
13	5	"A Way To Grieve"	Ugla Hauksdóttir	Nina Segal	July 3, 2020
Marissa is imprisoned in The Meadows while Hanna is encouraged to embrace her new identity as Mia Wolff. But doing so requires grieving for Erik, which Terri helps accelerate. Marissa escapes and convinces Hanna to leave, only for Clara to get in their way. Clara shoots Marissa and tells Carmichael that Hanna did it to stop Marissa from kidnapping her. Hanna is accepted back into The Meadows.
14	6	"You're With Us Now"	Ugla Hauksdóttir	Charlotte Hamblin	July 3, 2020
Hanna and Jules are sent on their first mission. They are to kill a journalist in London who is planning to meet with a military lawyer intent on exposing Utrax's secrets. Meanwhile, Sandy and Clara fly to Barcelona to recover the evidence. Hanna attempts to back out and joins forces with Mannion in an attempt to save the journalist's life, but Jules and Leo are one step ahead. The consequences are disastrous.
15	7	"Tacitus"	David Farr	David Farr	July 3, 2020
Hanna arrives in Barcelona, intent on saving Gelder and persuading Clara to leave Utrax. Hanna tells Clara the name and whereabouts of her mother, leaving her conflicted. Sandy has earned Gelder's daughter Kat's trust and is furious when Clara backs out of killing them. She kills Gelder whilst Hanna and Clara escape with Kat. Marissa is tasked with finding Hanna by Mannion's colleague, Grant.
16	8	"The List"	David Farr	David Farr	July 3, 2020
Following Gelder's murder, Carmichael arrives in Barcelona. Hanna, Clara and Kat hide in a hillside villa. Hanna returns to the hotel and recovers Gelder's target list. She is helped by Marissa, who follows Carmichael to the villa and blackmails him into bringing his fellow Utrax leaders to justice. Hanna allows Clara to reunite with her mother before returning to Marissa to help destroy Utrax.

=== Season 3 (2021) ===
No. overall	No. in season	Title	Directed by	Written by	Original release date
17	1	"Résistance"	Sacha Polak	David Farr	November 24, 2021
Hanna returns to The Meadows with Carmichael who concocts a cover story explaining her activities. A Pioneer operative, named Brianna Stapleton, arrives at the Meadows. A Pioneer target named Ethan communicates to Marissa details of Pioneer group. Meanwhile, Sandy still doesn't trust Hanna and Jules is having trouble dealing with the events that transpired. Hanna goes to Paris for her first assignment. She makes contact with her target and appears to throw him to his death, but bystanders burn the body. Marissa was there with Hanna just before the apparent assassination.
18	2	"Grape Vines and Orange Trees"	Sacha Polak	David Farr	November 24, 2021
It is revealed that Hanna did not kill Abbas Naziri. Marissa obtains a photo of The Chairman and vomits after seeing it. A flashback reveals that he may be her father. Hanna visits Abbas in the safe house and has sex with him. Later, the safe house is discovered, and Abbas is shot. Carmichael is discovered by Stapleton and Hanna's mission to Rome is blown. A shootout occurs with Hanna and Marissa fighting several armed professionals.
19	3	"Nadiya"	Weronika Tofilska	Selina Lim	November 24, 2021
Hanna and Marissa buy multiple tickets to multiple destinations to throw Stapleton off their tracks. Carmichael bargains with the Chairman to deliver Marissa. Hanna tracks Abbas to the east of France and meets his daughter, Nadiya. They are found but are able to escape capture but Abbas's mother is killed. Meanwhile, Sandy kidnaps Ethan and kills his pregnant girlfriend.
20	4	"Look Me In the Eye"	Weronika Tofilska	Paul Waters	November 24, 2021
Sandy tries to kill Ethan and make it look like suicide, but Hanna stops her in time. Marissa meets her father, the Chairman, Gordon Evans, who invites her back to run Utrax from the very top. Marissa and Hanna break into the old US Embassy where Stapleton is stationed after luring her out under false pretenses. They destroy the servers that generate "the list" and Max, the computer analyst, is shot in the process. Marissa has a chance to kill her father but cannot. Later, Hanna gets shot and is captured but Marissa escapes.
21	5	"Eyeliner"	Anca Miruna Lăzărescu	David Farr	November 24, 2021
Marissa returns to the safe house and finds Ethan tied up. They then proceed to blow up the safe house using Molotov cocktails. Hanna meets Gordon Evans, and he reveals that he carries a photo of Hanna. Marissa discovers that the drive is encrypted and unrecoverable without Max's private key. Max is presumed dead. Meanwhile, Carmichael is captured, betrays Marissa and is later killed by Sandy. Hanna convinces Marissa to surrender by communicating to her that Max is alive.
22	6	"Do Not Sleep"	Anca Miruna Lăzărescu	David Farr	November 24, 2021
Marissa and Hanna pretend to surrender to Pioneer in order to get to Max and his private key. Hanna disguises herself to protect Abbas. Sandy is brought in to find and kill Hanna. Marissa trusts Terri to deliver Max's private key to Ethan. Hanna kills Abbas's pursuers but Nadiya is discovered by Sandy. Meanwhile, Jules has followed Sandy to the farmhouse and kills her when she refuses to change. Marissa kills Stapleton and her father but succumbs to her own wounds. Hanna resettles in Boston.

== Production ==
=== Development ===
On May 23, 2017, it was announced that Amazon had given the production a straight-to-series order. David Farr, who co-wrote the film, was expected to write the series. Executive producers were set to include Marty Adelstein, Becky Clements, Scott Nemes, and JoAnn Alfano. Production companies involved with the series were slated to consist of Tomorrow Studios and NBCUniversal International Studios.

On February 8, 2018, it was announced that the series would be directed by Sarah Adina Smith and that Working Title Television, with executive producers Tim Bevan and Eric Fellner, had joined the production. On April 11, 2019, it was reported that Amazon renewed the series for a second season, which premiered on July 3, 2020. On July 13, 2020, Amazon renewed the series for a third and final season, which premiered on November 24, 2021.

=== Casting ===
On February 8, 2018, it was announced that Mireille Enos, Joel Kinnaman, and Esme Creed-Miles had been cast in the series' lead roles. In September 2019, it was reported that Dermot Mulroney, Anthony Welsh, Severine Howell-Meri, Cherelle Skeete, and Gianna Kiehl were joining the cast of Hanna for its second season, with Yasmin Monet Prince and Áine Rose Daly also returning from the first season.

=== Filming ===
Principal photography for the series was expected to begin in March 2018 in Hungary, Slovakia, Spain, and the United Kingdom. Filming was also set to take place in Spain at the port of Almeria and the Estación Intermodal.

For the second season, filming took place in the United Kingdom, and in Barcelona and Paris. Filming also took place in the French department Nord, which doubled as the city of Charleroi, Belgium. The second season takes place at the fictional Meadows campus, which was filmed at Bramshill House in Bramshill, UK.

The third season of Hanna began filming in Prague, Czech Republic in February 2021, the first time the series has filmed there. Prague's Karlín district was also used.

== Release ==
The full eight-episode first season of Hanna was released March 29, 2019. On February 3, 2019, coinciding with the broadcast of a teaser for the series during Super Bowl LIII, the first episode was made available on Amazon Video as a time-limited preview for 24 hours.

== Reception ==
On review aggregator Rotten Tomatoes, the first season holds an approval rating of 67% based on 39 reviews, with an average rating of 6.63/10. The website's critical consensus reads, "A gritty reimagining of the 2011 film, Hanna adds new wrinkles to the mythology and texture to the titular assassin – though the series' long-winded journey may try the patience of viewers who want their violent fables concise." On Metacritic, it has a weighted average score of 60 out of 100, based on 19 critics, indicating "mixed or average reviews".

Nick Allen of RogerEbert.com gave the series a negative review, saying that "it's one of the more maddening examples in recent film adapting, and not just because it's so similar to its singular 2011 parent, Joe Wright's Hanna."

The second season holds a Rotten Tomatoes critics score of 93%, based on 15 reviews indicating universal acclaim.

At the 1st Critics' Choice Super Awards, the series received three nominations: Best Action Series and Best Actress in an Action Series (Creed-Miles, Enos).
