= Joanna Kavenna =

British writer

- Born: 1974 (age 51–52); Leicester
- Occupations: Novelist and travel writer
- Writing career
- Notable works: The Ice Museum (2005), Inglorious (2007), The Birth of Love (2010)
- Notable awards: Orange Award for New Writers (2008)

Joanna Kavenna (born 1974) is a British novelist, essayist and travel writer. She won the Orange Award for New Writers for her novel Inglorious. She has also been longlisted for the Guardian First Book Award and the Orange Prize and shortlisted for the Ondaatje Prize and the John Llewellyn Rhys Prize.

== Biography ==
Kavenna was born in Leicester. She has Welsh and Scandinavian ancestry. She grew up in various parts of Britain, including Suffolk and the Midlands, but describes Loughborough as the place where she spent her formative years. She has also lived in the United States, France, Germany, Scandinavia and the Baltic states, living in fifty places during her twenties.

Kavenna studied English literature at Bristol University and did a PhD on Charlotte Mew at Linacre College, Oxford. She has held writing fellowships at St Antony's College, Oxford and St John's College, Cambridge. In 2010, she was appointed the first writer-in-residence at St Peter's College, Oxford.

She was environment editor for The Guardian in 2000. She has written for The New Yorker, The Huffington Post, The London Review of Books, The Guardian, The Observer, the International Herald Tribune and The New York Times, among other publications. Themes of the country versus the city, the relationship between self and place, and the plight of the individual in hyper-capitalist society recur through both Kavenna's novels and some of her journalism.

She was included in Granta's Best of Young British Novelists in 2013.

Kavenna was elected a Fellow of the Royal Society of Literature in 2024.

She has two children with thriller writer Tom Martin. After having children, she lived for more than ten years in a village near Banbury. She now lives in the Duddon Valley, Cumbria.

== Books ==
Ater writing several unpublished novels, Kavenna's first book, The Ice Museum was published in 2005. It combines history, travel, literary criticism and first-person narrative, as the author journeys through Scotland, Norway, Iceland, the Baltic and Greenland. Along the way, Kavenna investigates various myths and travellers' yarns about the northerly regions, focusing particularly on the ancient Greek story of Thule, the last land in the North. It was longlisted for the Guardian First Book Award in 2005. In 2006 it was shortlisted for the Ondaatje Prize and the Dolman Best Travel Book Award.

Kavenna's first published novel, Inglorious (2007), follows Rosa's increasing disillusionment with her life following the death of her mother. After leaving her job and breaking up with her partner, she leaves the city for rural Cumbria on a quest to find meaning. The novel alludes to classics of urban dislocation such as Knut Hamsun's Hunger, Robert Musil's The Man Without Qualities and Saul Bellow's Herzog. It was shortlisted for the John Llewellyn Rhys Prize in 2007. In 2008 it won the Orange Award for New Writers.

Her second novel, The Birth of Love (2010), turns to ideas of power and childbirth and the nature of reality, portraying three characters in three periods of history, whose lives are wholly altered by their experiences of childbirth. Questions about the relationship between technology and nature run through the novel; also the permeable boundaries between reality and fantasy. The first, historical strand is based on the real-life Hungarian-born Ignaz Philipp Semmelweis, a doctor working in 19th-century Vienna, who realised that the spread of child-bed or puerperal fever could be prevented if doctors would wash their hands between patients. His theories were generally ignored, and he died in an asylum. Kavenna turns a real-life history into an extract from a (fictional) Gothic novel, in which Semmelweis is visited by an invented character, Robert von Lucius, who begins as a sceptic like the other doctors, but comes to believe Semmelweis. In the second strand, in a recognisable present-day London, a woman called Brigid goes into labour with her second child. Meanwhile, in the third strand, also set in London today, a writer publishes his Gothic novel about Ignaz Semmelweis. In the fourth strand, set in a dystopian future, a prisoner and her captor argue about eugenics and the control of women's bodies. It gradually becomes clear that this society has taken to forcibly sterilising women to control population numbers and demands on depleted resources after an environmental apocalypse. A group of dissidents has been uncovered, who hid a pregnant woman so that she could give birth naturally. This section clearly pastiches a tradition of dystopian dialogue, from William Morris through H. G. Wells, to Marge Piercy, as well as the classic sci-fi interrogation scene.

The Birth of Love is structured as a quartet. Kavenna draws all her strands together in a climactic final section, in which birth is shown to be a moment in which past, present and future merge. Kavenna has suggested that she wanted to write an "epic" about childbirth, emphasising its central role in the lives of both men and women. It was long-listed for the Orange Prize in 2011. Writing about this novel in The Observer, Rachel Cusk said that the novel is not always "tasteful" but is ultimately "uninhibitedly truthful...daring...and brilliant".

Kavenna's third novel, Come to the Edge (2012) is a satire, set in a fictionalised version of the Duddon Valley, Cumbria. Kavenna has explained that: "It's about what happens when you push people too far, when you keep whacking them with one injustice after another – when society gets too plainly iniquitous, and how finally they crack." The novel tells of the surreal events that transpire when the narrator, at a loss in life, answers an advert to be a lodger and farm worker on a remote farm in the Lake District. She goes to the Lakes expecting some usual variation on the reviving and consoling country retreat, but she arrives and discovers the widowed farmer she will be living with, Cassandra White, is a paranoid survivalist and renegade philosopher with all sorts of theories about society, along with strong views on the evils of grain and the vices of "perverts" – Cassandra's term for the rich. The valley is a place of notable contrasts: between the poor who can barely afford to stay in their homes in the Valley, and the rich who buy up second homes and hardly use them. Goaded by a sense of riotous injustice and convinced that wider society cares little about the rural poor, Cassandra and the narrator develop a "resettlement scheme" – to resettle the poor in the empty houses of the rich. The novel is a dark comedy, yet it also makes a serious point throughout, about the iniquities of hyper-consumerist society and the free market notion of ceaseless growth as an inevitable good. Kavenna wrote the book five years before publication, while living in the Duddon Valley, and has said that it took a while to find the right editor for it.

Kavenna has also suggested that the novel riffs on the old relationship of the prophet/sage and an interpreter, or the fabulous freak and a less charismatic companion: a venerable tradition from Plato and Socrates through the Romantics, which also forms the basis of such novels as Evelyn Waugh's Brideshead Revisited and Jack Kerouac's On the Road.

Kavenna's fourth novel, A Field Guide to Reality (2016) imagines a parallel version of Oxford, where a professor has created a "manual for fixing existential angst;" a vast compendium of philosophical thought through the ages. This is the Field Guide to Reality of the title. However, the manual has gone missing and all the characters are trying to find it, for various reasons. Throughout the book, Kavenna considers recurring philosophical questions about the nature of reality and truth. Stuart Kelly in The Scotsman described it as a novel that "deals with the nature of light and enlightenment, quantum physics and strange attractors, grieving and gifting.... There is a very English kind of surrealism at play." In The Spectator, Sam Byers argued for it as a "work of cunning misdirection and trickery – a mystery in thrall to mystery's beauty." The Guardian, referring to "Joanna Kavenna's varied and prodigious output", argued that this "unusual novel... delighted and confounded the critics." It is illustrated by the English songwriter, artist and filmmaker Oly Ralfe, of the Ralfe Band, who also worked with the Mighty Boosh.

Kavenna has suggested that the novel was partly inspired by the Jorge Luis Borges story "The Garden of Forking Paths", and by contemporary debates about theories of everything.

Kavenna's fifth novel, Zed, published in 2019, is a dystopian satire about technology set in the near future.

Kavenna's sixth novel, Seven (Or, How to Play a Game Without Rules), was published in 2026. For the novel, Kavenna invented a faux-ancient board game, Seven, which features heavily in the plot. The unnamed, gender-ambiguous protagonist is sent to Hydra by an Icelandic philosopher to learn more about the board game from one Theódoros Apostolakis, a poet and dentist, who is obsessed with the game of Seven.

== Publications ==
=== Non-fiction ===
- 2005: The Ice Museum: In Search of the Lost Land of Thule, London, Penguin. ISBN 978-0-14-101198-1
- 2014: Essays on the Self, London, Notting Hill Editions. ISBN 978-1907903922

==== As contributor ====
- 2016: Alchemy, London, Notting Hill Editions. ISBN 978-1910749166

=== Novels ===
- 2007: Inglorious, London, Faber. ISBN 978-0-571-23261-1
- 2010: The Birth of Love, London, Faber. ISBN 978-0-571-24517-8
- 2012: Come to the Edge, London, Quercus. ISBN 978-1780872131
- 2016: A Field Guide to Reality, London, Quercus. ISBN 978-1780872292
- 2019: Zed, London, Faber. ISBN 9780571245154
- 2026: Seven, London, Faber. ISBN 9780571338153
