= Orange Award for New Writers =

Former Award for New Writers in England (2006-2010)

- Awarded for: a great debut novel by a woman, written in English
- Location: United Kingdom
- Presented by: Orange UK
- First award: 2006
- Final award: 2010
- Website: Website

The Orange Award for New Writers was a prize given by telecommunications company Orange UK between 2006 and 2010. It was launched to commemorate the tenth anniversary of the Orange Prize for Fiction. The award was supported by Arts Council England and was accompanied by a bursary of £10,000. It was open to any female authors who had written their debut novel in the English language.

== Winners and shortlisted nominees ==
Year	Winner	Work	Shortlisted nominations	Ref
2005	Diana Evans	26a	Nell Freudenberger – Lucky Girls; Meg Rosoff – How I Live Now	
2006	Naomi Alderman	Disobedience	Olga Grushin – The Dream Life of Sukhanov; Yiyun Li – A Thousand Years of Good Prayers	
2007	Karen Connelly	The Lizard Cage	Clare Allan – Poppy Shakespeare; Roopa Farooki – Bitter Sweets	
2008	Joanna Kavenna	Inglorious	Lauren Groff – The Monsters of Templeton; Lauren Liebenberg – The Voluptuous Delights of Peanut Butter and Jam	
2009	Francesca Kay	An Equal Stillness	Nami Mun – Miles from Nowhere; Ann Weisgarber – The Personal History of Rachel DuPree	
2010	Irene Sabatini	The Boy Next Door	Jane Borodale – The Book of Fires; Evie Wyld – After the Fire, a Still Small Voice	
