= The Power (Alderman novel) =

2016 sci-fi novel by Naomi Alderman

- Author: Naomi Alderman
- Illustrator: Marsh Davies
- Genre: Science fiction
- Publisher: Viking
- Publication date: 2016
- Publication place: Great Britain
- Pages: 340 pp
- ISBN: 978-0-670-91998-7

The Power is a 2016 science fiction novel by the British writer Naomi Alderman. Its central premise is of women developing the ability to release electrical jolts from their fingers, which allows them to become the dominant sex. In 2017, it won the Baileys Women's Prize for Fiction.

== Overview ==
The Power is a book within a book: a manuscript of an imagined history of the tumultuous 21st century period – now 5,000 years in the past – during which womankind became the dominant gender after developing and sharing the power to emit electricity from their hands. The manuscript is submitted by Neil Adam Armon to another author named Naomi Alderman for an early read; it includes historical research aimed at filling in missing details leading up to the Cataclysm, in which one of the then-newly empowered females destroyed all modern technology. The manuscript author's name, Neil Adam Armon, is an anagram of Naomi Alderman.

== Plot ==
The Power opens with a letter from a male writer from the "Men Writer's Association," asking Naomi Alderman to read his historical novel. He gushes praise upon Alderman and thanks her profusely for her time.

The novel follows four characters around the world as girls begin to demonstrate electrical powers. Roxy is an English daughter of a gangster whose mother is attacked. She manages to defend herself with the power, injuring one attacker, but another beats her up and kills her mother. Tunde is an aspiring male journalist in Nigeria who starts to film women using their emerging power and publishes it online. Margot is a mayor who discovers her daughter Jocelyn is developing the power. Allie is a foster child who kills her abusive foster father with her powers before taking refuge in a convent.

The power is found to come from an electricity-generating organ, called the "skein", almost exclusively found in women. Margot and other older women gain the ability from younger women. The phenomenon is blamed on multiple causes, but hope that an antidote or cure will be found fades. Tunde's reputation allows him unique access to Saudi Arabia and elsewhere to document growing turmoil as revolutions take place. Allie, going by the name "Eve", discovers how to use her powers to heal. She becomes the leader of a reinterpreted, matriarchal religion movement. Roxy kills the man she believes responsible for her mother's death, and heads to America to lay low, meeting Eve and agreeing with her message of empowerment. Margot develops training camps for girls to use their powers, using approval of her proactive steps to respond to the crisis to launch a gubernatorial campaign. Margot uses her powers on her opponent in a debate, but the show of strength resonates with voters and she becomes governor, and later a senator.

As formerly trafficked women in Moldova start paramilitary groups, Tatiana, the Moldovan president's wife, steps in to take over the country. After a military coup, she forms a pro-woman country called Bessapara in the south, while a rebel army funded by disempowered men opposes her in the north. Tunde is nearly raped while covering marauding women in India. Returning to England, Roxy begins trafficking a drug called "glitter" that enhances a woman's power. She learns that her mother's death was orchestrated by her father; she exiles him and takes over the criminal enterprise, with her brother Darrell as second-in-command.

Eve takes her following to Bessapara, where she becomes a trusted adviser to Tatiana. Margot uses her senatorial influence and network of public-private girls training camps to develop soldiers to fight in Bessapara and other conflicts, while Roxy supplies the fighters with glitter. As the war rages on, Tatiana's rule becomes erratic and paranoid; she begins drastically curtailing men's civil rights. Rather than be expelled from the country like other journalists, Tunde decides to strike out on his own, sending his research and documentation to a trusted colleague, Nina, for safekeeping. He documents the increasing atrocities against men. Roxy is led into an ambush by Darrell, who transplants Roxy's skein onto himself. Roxy escapes and is believed dead, while Darrell takes over the glitter operation in Bessapara. Tunde tries to escape the country, but finds that he has been declared dead and Nina is passing off his journalistic work as her own. Tunde is captured but freed by Roxy, who agrees to get him out of the country. After the refugee camp they are staying in is attacked by rape gangs, they narrowly escape and form a bond of trust. Tunde is smuggled out of the country, while Roxy stays to try and retrieve her skein.

Fearing that Tatiana's erratic behaviour threatens Bessapara, Eve uses her power to make Tatiana slit her throat in an apparent suicide and takes control of the country. Jocelyn, who is in the country as a private mercenary, suspects they are being given glitter, and sets out to find if her mother is involved in a drug ring. She is discovered by Darrell, who seriously injures her with his power, but is in turn ripped apart by the women under his command. Eve decides to continue the war, planning on embroiling the world in a devastating global conflict that will reset humanity back to the Stone Age, to rebuild under female hegemony; devastated by Jocelyn's injuries, Margot pushes the American president to back Bessapara, and the global cataclysm comes to pass.

As a bookend, the influential author responds to the young male writer, telling him the book is a strong effort but found some of the details—such as male-dominated armies—far-fetched, and believes a man-dominated society would be more gentle. She suggests that he might find more success with the book if he publishes it under a female name.

== Characters ==
=== Main characters ===
- Allie Montgomery-Taylor – a young girl who uses her power to kill her abusive foster father. She retreats to a convent where she becomes a religious figure named Mother Eve.
- Roxy Monke – the young daughter of a London mob boss and is a witness to her mother's murder. She meets with Mother Eve at the convent to seek help in strengthening her powers and ends up becoming Mother Eve's confidante.
- Margot Cleary – an American politician and advocate for training young girls on how to properly use their power. She creates the North Star Girls Camps across the country as part of her advocacy.
- Olatunde "Tunde" Edo – a Nigerian journalist who documents the growing power of women across the globe. He first gains recognition by posting one of the first videos of women using their power online. During a period of extreme social and political turmoil in Bessapara, his death is faked without his knowledge. Photos and reports of events in Bessapara he sent to a friend for safekeeping are stolen by her and published under her name.

=== Other important characters ===
- Jocelyn Cleary – the daughter of Margot Cleary and experiences power fluctuations. Despite her difficulties, Jocelyn is able to awaken her mother's power.
- Tatiana Moskalev – the former first lady of Moldova. After killing her husband, she takes over the role of president and reconstitutes Moldova as a matriarchal country called Bessapara.
- Neil Adam Armon – the fictional author of The Power and a member of The Men's Writers Association. Neil reaches out to Naomi through letters to discuss her thoughts on his book. (The name is an anagram of Naomi Alderman.)

== Development history ==
The Power is Alderman's fourth novel and was influenced by her relationship with the Canadian novelist Margaret Atwood. The mentorship was arranged through the Rolex mentorship programme. In an interview with The Daily Telegraph in 2012, Alderman explained the influence of Atwood's work on her as a novelist before the mentorship as, "I'd been to an Orthodox Jewish primary school where every morning the boys said, 'Thank you God for not making me a woman.' If you put that together with The Handmaid's Tale in your head, something will eventually go fizz! Boom!"

In a 2016 interview with The Guardian, Alderman described being inspired by Atwood while writing the novel, saying, "The one thing Margaret directly suggested was the idea of a convent." In that interview, she also stated that she had written roughly 200,000 words of a novel, before scrapping that draft at the end of 2013 and changed the entire concept into what became The Power, based on about 2,000 words of the original effort.

In December 2016, Alderman stated that "readers of The Power are already asking me if there'll be a sequel – there won't be another novel (probably), but there are definitely so many more stories to tell than I had room for in the book."

== Critical reception ==
The Washington Post reviewer Ron Charles praised the novel as "one of those essential feminist works that terrifies and illuminates, enrages and encourages". In a positive review for The New York Times Book Review, contributor Amal El-Mohtar said that "it doesn't quite make sense on a world-building level or cohere on a philosophical one."

In June 2017, The Power won the £30,000 (equivalent to £40,100 in 2025) Baileys Women's Prize for Fiction; it was the first science fiction novel to win the prize in its (then) 22-year history. At year's end, it was named by The New York Times as one of the 10 Best Books of 2017.

== Adaptations ==
=== Television ===
In December 2016, shortly after the novel was published, the TV rights to adapt The Power were acquired by Jane Featherstone in an 11-way auction. Adapted as a nine-episode Amazon Prime Video television series, it completed filming in 2022 (following extensive delays due to the impact of the COVID-19 pandemic on television productions), was released on 31 March 2023 and concluded on 12 May 2023. The cast includes Toni Collette as Margot, Halle Bush as Allie and Ria Zmitrowicz as Roxy.

== See also ==
- Biology in fiction, which considers this novel among others.
