= Naomi Alderman =

English novelist and game writer

Naomi Alderman FRSL
- Born: 23 October 1974 (age 52); London, England
- Education: South Hampstead High School; Lincoln College, Oxford; University of East Anglia
- Occupations: Writer, novelist
- Writing career
- Genres: Literary fiction Science fiction
- Notable works: Disobedience (2006); The Power (2016)
- Website: www.naomialderman.com

Naomi Alderman (born 1974) is an English novelist, game writer, and television executive producer. She is best known for her speculative science fiction novel The Power, which won the Women's Prize for Fiction in 2017 and has been adapted into a television series for Amazon Studios.

== Biography ==
Naomi Alderman was born in London, the daughter of Geoffrey Alderman, a specialist in Anglo-Jewish history who has described himself as an unconventional Orthodox Jew. Alderman was educated at South Hampstead High School and Lincoln College, Oxford, where she read Philosophy, Politics and Economics. After she left Oxford, she worked in children's publishing and then for a law firm, editing their publications. She went on to study creative writing at the University of East Anglia before becoming a novelist. In 2007, The Sunday Times named her their Young Writer of the Year. In 2007, she was named as one of the 25 Writers of the Future by Waterstones.

In 2012, Alderman was appointed professor of creative writing at Bath Spa University, England. In 2013, she was included in the Granta once-a-decade list of 20 best young writers. She writes a monthly technology column for The Guardian.

Alderman became an advocate for feminism in her teenage years and has since supported women's rights, which has influenced her works. She stated in a 2018 New York Times interview, "When I was a teenager in the 1990s, it was a common thing among young women to say that feminism's battles are won. Now I think it's very horrifically obvious that that is not the case." She wrote The Power to address points made by the fourth-wave feminism movement and cites the Me Too movement as an inspiration and a source of similar dialogue.

== Works ==
Alderman was the lead writer for Perplex City, an alternative reality game, at the company Mind Candy. She went on to become lead writer on other apps including Zombies, Run! and The Walk. In 2018 The Walk was turned into a podcast and released through Panoply Media.

Alderman's literary debut came in 2006 with Disobedience, a well-received, if somewhat controversial, novel about a North London rabbi's lesbian daughter living in New York, which won Alderman the 2006 Orange Award for New Writers, the 2007 Sunday Times Young Writer of the Year Award, and a feature as one of the Waterstones 25 Writers for the Future. It led her to reject her life as a practising Jew. "I went into the novel religious and by the end I wasn't. I wrote myself out of it," she told Claire Armitstead of The Guardian in 2016. Her second novel, The Lessons, was published in 2010.

Her third novel, The Liars' Gospel (Viking), with Jesus portrayed as the Jewish preacher Yehoshuah, was published in paperback in 2012. Reviewing the book, Shoshi Ish-Horowicz in the Jewish Renaissance magazine described it as "an entertaining, engaging read" but found the story it told "uncomfortable and problematic. Your enjoyment of the novel will depend on how you respond to the premise that Jesus was, potentially, an 'inconsequential preacher'". Set in and around Jerusalem between Pompey's Siege of Jerusalem (63 BC) and Titus' Siege of Jerusalem (70), it is narrated in four main sections from the perspective of four key figures: Mary, Judas Iscariot, Caiaphas and Barabbas. All three novels have been serialised on BBC Radio 4's Book at Bedtime.

She wrote the narrative for The Winter House, an online interactive linear short story visualised by Jey Biddulph. The project was commissioned by BookTrust as part of the Story campaign, supported by Arts Council England. Her Doctor Who novel Borrowed Time was published in June 2011.

In 2012, Alderman was selected as a protégé by Margaret Atwood as part of the Rolex Mentor and Protégé Arts Initiative, an international philanthropic programme that pairs masters in their disciplines with emerging talents for a year of one-to-one creative exchange. Atwood and Alderman co-wrote “The Happy Zombie Sunrise Home” and self-published the work online on Wattpad in 2012.

Alderman's fourth novel, The Power, was published in 2016. The Power is dedicated to and influenced by Atwood. The Power won the Women's Prize for Fiction in 2017. Alderman has confirmed that she sold the rights of The Power to Sister Pictures, the same company who produced Broadchurch, after receiving eleven offers. The television adaptation was subsequently produced as nine episodes, which premiered on 31 March 2023 and concluded on 12 May 2023.

She was elected a Fellow of the Royal Society of Literature in 2018.

== Bibliography ==
- —— (2006). Disobedience (hardcover 1st ed.). Touchstone Books. p. 227. ISBN 9780743291569.
- —— (2010). The Lessons (paperback ed.). Viking Books. p. 288. ISBN 9780670916290.
- —— (2011). Borrowed Time (hardback ed.). BBC Books. p. 255. ISBN 9781849902335.
- —— (2012). The Liars' Gospel (hardcover 1st ed.). Viking Books. p. 272. ISBN 9780670919901.
- —— (2016). The Power (hardcover 2017 ed.). Little, Brown. p. 400. ISBN 9780316547611.
- The Open Mind, a short story published in Marple: Twelve New Stories
- —— (2023). The Future (hardcover 2023 ed.). Simon & Schuster. p. 432. ISBN 9781668025680.
- —— (2025). Don't Burn Anyone at the Stake Today (hardcover 1st ed.). Penguin Books. p. 176. ISBN 9780241777633.
