= Violent Femmes discography =

- Studio albums: 10
- Extended plays: 1
- Live albums: 5
- Compilation albums: 4
- Singles: 19
- Video albums: 3
- Music videos: 15
- Miscellaneous: 16

This is the discography of Violent Femmes, a Milwaukee, Wisconsin-based alternative rock group, which consists of 10 studio albums, 19 singles, five live albums and four compilation albums, in addition to a number of miscellaneous appearances on soundtracks and compilations featuring various artists. This list does not include solo material by any of the bands' members.

Violent Femmes was formed in 1980 by vocalist/guitarist Gordon Gano, bassist Brian Ritchie and drummer Victor DeLorenzo, finding immediate success with the release of their self-titled debut album in early 1983. Featuring "Blister in the Sun", "Kiss Off", "Add It Up" and "Gone Daddy Gone", Violent Femmes became the band's biggest-selling album and was eventually certified platinum by the RIAA. Although the sales success of their debut was never matched, The Blind Leading the Naked (1986), 3 (1988), Why Do Birds Sing? (1991) and New Times (1994) all peaked at higher chart positions on the Billboard 200. Throughout their career, Violent Femmes' popularity remained consistent, especially in Australia where four of their albums made the Top 40 and the debut stayed on the charts for seven months. The songs "Nightmares" and "American Music" cracked the top five on the US Modern Rock Tracks chart. In the aftermath of an on-going courtcase the group disbanded. They reformed in 2013, and has since released We Can Do Anything in 2016, and the album Hotel Last Resort (2019).

== Albums ==
=== Studio albums ===
| Year | Album details | Chart peaks | | | | | | | | | | Certifications (sales thresholds) |
| Year | Album details | US | US Indie | AUS | BEL (Vl.) | BEL (Wa.) | CAN | GER | NZ | SWE | UK | Certifications (sales thresholds) |
|---|---|---|---|---|---|---|---|---|---|---|---|---|
| 1983 | Violent Femmes: Released: April 1983; Label: Slash (23845); Formats: CD, cassette (CS), LP | 171 | — | 31 | — | — | — | — | 36 | — | — | RIAA: Platinum; ARIA: 2× Platinum |
| 1984 | Hallowed Ground: Released: June 1984; Label: Slash (25094); Formats: CD, CS, LP | — | — | 56 | — | — | — | — | 39 | — | — | |
| 1986 | The Blind Leading the Naked: Released: March 1986; Labels: Warner Bros., Slash (25340); Formats: CD, CS, LP | 84 | — | 31 | — | — | 77 | — | 6 | 27 | 81 | |
| 1989 | 3: Released: January 1989; Labels: Warner Bros., Slash (25819); Formats: CD, CS, LP | 93 | — | 64 | — | — | — | — | — | — | — | |
| 1991 | Why Do Birds Sing?: Released: April 30, 1991; Labels: Slash, Reprise (26476); Formats: CD, CS, LP | 141 | — | 26 | — | — | — | 67 | 31 | — | — | ARIA: Gold |
| 1994 | New Times: Released: May 17, 1994; Label: Elektra (61553); Formats: CD, CS, LP | 90 | — | 60 | — | — | 67 | 95 | — | — | — | |
| 1995 | Rock!!!!!: Released: 1995 (Australia), 2000 (US); Label: Mushroom (93424); Format: CD, CS | — | — | 30 | — | — | — | — | 33 | — | — | |
| 2000 | Freak Magnet: Released: February 22, 2000; Labels: Beyond Music, BMG Entertainment (78058); Format: CD | — | — | — | — | — | — | — | — | — | — | |
| 2016 | We Can Do Anything: Released: March 4, 2016; Label: PIAS America (PIASR420CDX [CD]; PIASR420LP [LP]); Format: CD, LP, download | 184 | 9 | 59 | 153 | 147 | — | — | — | — | — | |
| 2019 | Hotel Last Resort: Released: July 26, 2019; Label: PIAS America (PIASR1100); Format: CD, LP, download | — | 29 | — | — | — | — | — | — | — | — | |
"—" denotes a release that did not chart.

=== Live albums ===
| Year | Album details |
|---|---|
| 1999 | Viva Wisconsin: Released: November 23, 1999; Labels: Beyond Music, BMG Entertainment (78024); Format: CD |
| 2005 | BBC Live: Released: August 2, 2005; Label: Hux Records (065); Format: CD |
| 2006 | Archive Series No. 1: Live in Iceland: Released: July 27, 2006; Label: Add It Up Productions (01); Format: CD |
| 2006 | Archive Series No. 2: Live in Chicago Q101: Released: September 2006; Label: Add It Up Productions (02); Format: CD |
| 2017 | 2 Mics & the Truth: Released: July 7, 2017; Label: PIAS America (PIASR975CD); Format: CD, LP |

=== Compilation albums ===
| Year | Album details | Chart peaks | | | | Certifications (sales thresholds) |
| Year | Album details | US | AUS | CAN | NZ | Certifications (sales thresholds) |
|---|---|---|---|---|---|---|
| 1990 | Debacle: The First Decade: Released: 1990; Label: Liberation Records (30477); Formats: CD, CS, LP | — | 39 | — | 41 | |
| 1993 | Add It Up (1981–1993): Released: September 14, 1993; Labels: Slash Records, Reprise Records (45403); Formats: CD, CS, 2xLP | 146 | 45 | 58 | 30 | RIAA: Gold; ARIA: Gold |
| 2001 | Something's Wrong: Released: August 2001; Label: eMusic.com; Format: Digital download | — | — | — | — | |
| 2005 | Permanent Record: The Very Best of Violent Femmes: Released: July 12, 2005; Label: Rhino Entertainment (78472); Format: CD | — | — | — | — | |
"—" denotes a release that did not chart.

== EPs ==
| Year | EP details |
|---|---|
| 2015 | Happy New Year: Released April 18, 2015; Label: Add It Up Productions (VF001); Format: 180-gram clear vinyl EP |

== Singles ==
=== Retail singles ===
| Year | Single | Peak chart positions | | Album |
| Year | Single | US Mod | AUS | Album |
|---|---|---|---|---|
| 1983 | "Gone Daddy Gone" | — | — | Violent Femmes |
| 1983 | "Ugly" | — | — | Non-album single |
| 1984 | "It's Gonna Rain" | — | — | Hallowed Ground |
| 1986 | "Children of the Revolution" | — | 54 | The Blind Leading the Naked |
| 1986 | "I Held Her in My Arms" | — | — | The Blind Leading the Naked |
| 1989 | "Nightmares" | 4 | 146 | 3 |
| 1991 | "American Music" | 2 | 118 | Why Do Birds Sing? |
| 1991 | "Do You Really Want to Hurt Me" | — | — | Why Do Birds Sing? |
| 1991 | "Used to Be" | — | 90 | Why Do Birds Sing? |
| 1993 | "I Held Her in My Arms" (alt. version) | — | 111 | Add It Up (1981–1993) |
| 1994 | "Machine" | — | — | New Times |
| 1994 | "Breakin' Up" | 12 | 118 | New Times |
| 1995 | "Tonight" | — | 62 | Rock!!!!! |
| 2000 | "All I Want" | — | — | Freak Magnet |
| 2000 | "Sleepwalkin'" | — | — | Freak Magnet |
| 2008 | "Crazy" | — | — | Non-album single |
| 2016 | "Memory"/"You Move Me" (Record Store Day 2016 release) | — | — | We Can Do Anything |
"—" denotes a release that did not chart.

=== Promotional singles ===
| Year | Single | Album |
|---|---|---|
| 1994 | "Don't Start Me on the Liquor" | New Times |
| 1995 | "She Went to Germany" | Rock!!!!! |
| 1997 | "Blister in the Sun" | Grosse Pointe Blank OST |

== Music videos ==
| Year | Song | Director(s) |
|---|---|---|
| 1983 | "Gone Daddy Gone" | Douglas Martin; Steven Martin |
| 1986 | "Children of the Revolution" | Mick Haggerty |
| 1989 | "Nightmares" | Martin Atkins |
| 1991 | "American Music" | Adam Bernstein |
| 1991 | "Used to Be" | Phil Waters |
| 1993 | "I Held Her in My Arms" | Mick Haggerty |
| 1994 | "Breakin' Up" | Mick Haggerty |
| 1994 | "Machine" | Sean Casey |
| 1995 | "Tonight" | Sean Casey |
| 1997 | "Blister in the Sun" | Evan Bernard |
| 2000 | "All I Want" | Dominic Engel |
| 2015 | "Love Love Love Love Love" | Jake Brebes |
| 2015 | "Good For/At Nothing" | Harley Hefford |
| 2016 | "Memory" | Harley Hefford |
| 2016 | "Issues" | David Gladstein |

== Video albums ==
| Year | Title |
|---|---|
| 2005 | Permanent Record: Live & Otherwise: Released: July 12, 2005; Label: Rhino Entertainment (970428); Format: DVD |
| 2006 | No, Let's Start Over: Released: March 28, 2006; Label: Universal Music Group (0602498756775); Format: DVD |
| 2007 | Live at the Haçienda: Released: December 11, 2007; Label: Cherry Red (CRDVD163); Format: DVD |

== Soundtracks and compilations ==
| Year | Title | Track(s) | Note(s) |
|---|---|---|---|
| 1987 | I Was a Teenage Zombie: Original Motion Picture Soundtrack | "Good Feeling" | |
| 1991 | Triple J's Live At The Wireless 2 | "Kiss Off" (live) | |
| 1991 | never mind the mainstream...The Best of MTV's 120 Minutes: Vol. 2 | "Gone Daddy Gone" | |
| 1994 | The Crow: Original Motion Picture Soundtrack | "Color Me Once" | |
| 1994 | Woodstock 94 | "Dance, Motherfucker, Dance!/Kiss Off" (live) | |
| 1995 | Step Right Up: The Songs of Tom Waits | "Step Right Up" | |
| 1995 | Saturday Morning: Cartoons' Greatest Hits | "Eep Opp Ork Ah-ah (Means I Love You)" | From The Jetsons. |
| 1997 | Grosse Pointe Blank Soundtrack | "Blister in the Sun" | Although it appears on the soundtrack, "Blister 2000" does not appear in the actual film. |
| 1997 | Grosse Pointe Blank Soundtrack | "Blister 2000" | Although it appears on the soundtrack, "Blister 2000" does not appear in the actual film. |
| 1998 | MTV's 120 Minutes Live | "Kiss Off" (live) | |
| 1999 | End Sessions: The End 107.7 | "Fat" (live) | |
| 1999 | South Park: Bigger, Longer & Uncut: Music From and Inspired by the Motion Picture | "I Swear It (I Can Change)" | The Femmes' rendition of "I Can Change" does not appear in the actual film. |
| 1999 | Mystery Men: Original Motion Picture Soundtrack | "No More Heroes" | |
| 1999 | The Best of KROQ's Almost Acoustic Christmas: Volume One | "Blister in the Sun" (live) | From Acoustic Christmas 1993. |
| 2000 | Y100 Sonic Sessions: Volume Four | "Add It Up" | |
| 2002 | Discrespective: Big Day Out | "Girl Trouble" (live) | |
| 2006 | Rocket Science: Original Motion Picture Soundtrack | "Blister in the Sun" | Instrumental covers of "Blister in the Sun" and "Add It Up" by Sam Matthews and Houfei Tang also appear in the film. |
| 2006 | Rocket Science: Original Motion Picture Soundtrack | "Kiss Off" | Instrumental covers of "Blister in the Sun" and "Add It Up" by Sam Matthews and Houfei Tang also appear in the film. |
| 2007 | Triple J's Live at the Wireless: From the Vaults | "Blister in the Sun" (live) | |
| 2023 | Okemah Rising | "Gotta Get to Peekskill" | The band appear on the Dropkick Murphys song from their 2023 studio album. |
