= Permanent Record: The Very Best of Violent Femmes =

Greatest hits album by Violent Femmes
- Released: July 12, 2005
- Genre: Alternative rock
- Length: 64:16
- Label: Rhino/Slash
- Producer: various

Violent Femmes chronology
Something's Wrong (2001)	Permanent Record: The Very Best of Violent Femmes (2005)	BBC Live (2005)

Professional ratings
Review scores
Source	Rating
AllMusic	4/5 stars
Blender	2/5 stars
Pitchfork	7.5/10 stars

Permanent Record: The Very Best Of is a greatest hits album by the band Violent Femmes. It was released on July 12, 2005.

== Track listing ==
All tracks are written by Gordon Gano except where noted.

No.	Title	Writer(s)	Length
1.	"Gimme the Car"		5:08
2.	"Blister in the Sun"		2:24
3.	"Gone Daddy Gone"/"I Just Want to Make Love to You"	Gano, Willie Dixon	3:06
4.	"Kiss Off"		2:56
5.	"Add It Up"		4:45
6.	"Black Girls"		5:42
7.	"Jesus Walking On the Water"		3:08
8.	"Children of the Revolution"	Marc Bolan	4:19
9.	"I Held Her in My Arms"		2:53
10.	"Nightmares"		3:33
11.	"American Music"		3:50
12.	"Breakin' Up"		4:01
13.	"Color Me Once"	Gano, Brian Ritchie	4:12
14.	"I Danced"	Gano, Max Dunn	2:12
15.	"Country Death Song" (Live)		4:55
16.	"Freak Magnet"		2:35

Hidden track
No.	Title	Length
17.	"Good Feeling" (Live at Rhino, 2002)	4:37

== Personnel ==
- Gordon Gano – Lead vocals, guitar, violin (3, 4, 7, 13)
- Brian Ritchie – Bass, vocals, xylophone (3, 4), jaw harp (6), guitar (8, 11), didgeridoo (11), reed organ (12), guitar solo (12, 14)
- Victor DeLorenzo – Drums, vocals (tracks 1–11, 17)
- Guy Hoffman – Drums, vocals (tracks 12, 13, 14, 15, 16)

Additional musicians

- Michael Blair – Percussion (track 11, 13)
- Steve Mackay – Saxophone (track 9)
