= Viva Wisconsin =

Live album by Violent Femmes
- Released: November 23, 1999
- Recorded: October 25–31, 1998
- Genre: Alternative rock
- Length: 72:46
- Label: Beyond
- Producer: David Vartanian

Violent Femmes chronology
| Rock!!!!! (1995) | Viva Wisconsin (1999) | Freak Magnet (2000) |

Professional ratings
Review scores
| Source | Rating |
|---|---|
| Allmusic | 4/5 stars |

Viva Wisconsin is a live album by Violent Femmes. It was released in November 1999. The songs were recorded on a six-date acoustic concert tour of their home state of Wisconsin in October 1998. The album was reissued by Shout! Factory on May 24, 2005. The back of the CD states “October 25–31, 1998 Violent Femmes did an acoustic tour of their home state of Wisconsin. Two guitars, two drums and three voices. Femmes back to basics, no overdubbing, no electronics, no crap. Their best songs, raw and intimate. This is the ultimate Violent Femmes recording.”

== Track listing ==
All tracks are written by Gordon Gano unless otherwise noted.

| No. | Title | Writer(s) | Length |
|---|---|---|---|
| 1. | "Prove My Love" | | 2:54 |
| 2. | "I'm Nothing" | | 2:27 |
| 3. | "Country Death Song" | | 4:50 |
| 4. | "Blister in the Sun" | | 2:32 |
| 5. | "Gimme the Car" | | 5:44 |
| 6. | "Don't Talk About My Music" | Donn Adams, Dominic Placco, Brian Ritchie | 2:13 |
| 7. | "Confessions" | | 7:32 |
| 8. | "Hallowed Ground" | | 3:44 |
| 9. | "Life Is an Adventure" | | 2:29 |
| 10. | "Old Mother Reagan" | | 0:30 |
| 11. | "Ugly" | | 2:54 |
| 12. | "Good Feeling" | | 4:25 |
| 13. | "Dahmer Is Dead" | | 0:53 |
| 14. | "American Music" | | 4:03 |
| 15. | "Special" | | 2:14 |
| 16. | "Sweet Worlds of Angels" | | 5:17 |
| 17. | "Black Girls" | | 4:30 |
| 18. | "Gone Daddy Gone" | Gano, Willie Dixon | 3:08 |
| 19. | "Add It Up" | | 5:59 |
| 20. | "Kiss Off" | | 4:28 |

Reissue bonus track
| No. | Title | Length |
|---|---|---|
| 21. | "Outside the Palace" | 2:45 |

== Personnel ==
Violent Femmes

- Gordon Gano – vocals, guitar
- Guy Hoffman – drums, vocals, bugle
- Brian Ritchie – bass guitar, vocals, shakuhachi, xylophone, soprano saxophone, harmonica, conch shell, theremin

The Horns of Dilemma

- Ray Cribb – trombone, bass guitar
- Shane Gerstl – saxophone
- Mike Koch – tenor saxophone
- Eric Markstrum – trombone
- Sigmund Snopek III – piano, vocals, oboe, flutes, bass clarinet, trombone

Production

- Dave Vartanian – production

== Charts ==
Chart performance for Viva Wisconsin / The Live Album
| Chart (1999) | Peak position |
|---|---|
| Australian Albums (ARIA) | 156 |
