= Add It Up (1981–1993) =

Compilation album by Violent Femmes
- Released: September 14, 1993
- Recorded: September 12, 1981 – April 6, 1992
- Genre: Rock
- Length: 72:08
- Label: Slash/Reprise

Violent Femmes chronology
Why Do Birds Sing? (1991)	Add It Up (1981–1993) (1993)	New Times (1994)

Professional ratings
Review scores
Source	Rating
AllMusic	4.5/5 stars

Add It Up (1981–1993) is a compilation album released by Violent Femmes in 1993.

== Track listing ==
All tracks are written by Gordon Gano, except where noted.

No.	Title	Writer(s)	Length
1.	"Intro"		0:15
2.	"Waiting for the Bus" (previously unreleased)		2:07
3.	"Blister in the Sun"		2:24
4.	"Gone Daddy Gone"	Gano, Willie Dixon	3:05
5.	"Gordon's Message" (previously unreleased)		0:27
6.	"Gimme the Car"		5:05
7.	"Country Death Song"		5:02
8.	"Black Girls"		5:41
9.	"Jesus Walking on the Water"		3:06
10.	"36-24-36" (previously unreleased)		1:48
11.	"I Held Her in My Arms" (alternate version)		3:01
12.	"I Hate the TV" (previously unreleased)		2:10
13.	"America Is" (previously unreleased)		2:10
14.	"Old Mother Reagan"		0:31
15.	"Degradation" (previously unreleased)	Brian Ritchie, Victor DeLorenzo	0:35
16.	"Dance, Motherfucker, Dance!" (previously unreleased in the US)	Voot Warnings, Glenn Rehse, John Frankovic	3:17
17.	"Lies" (live) (previously unreleased)		5:49
18.	"American Music"		3:50
19.	"Out the Window"		2:52
20.	"Kiss Off" (live) (previously unreleased in the US)		4:59
21.	"Add It Up" (live) (previously unreleased)		6:14
22.	"Vancouver" (live) (previously unreleased)	Ritchie, Gano, Delorenzo, Caleb Lentzer, Mike Kashou, Dominic Placco, Jerry Harrison	2:14
23.	"Johnny" (live) (previously unreleased)		5:26

== Personnel ==
- Gordon Gano – vocals, guitar
- Brian Ritchie – bass, vocals
- Victor DeLorenzo – drums, vocals
- Ashwin Batish – sitar on "Lies"

== Charts ==
Chart (1993)	Peak position
Australian Albums (ARIA)	45
New Zealand Albums (RMNZ)	30
US Billboard 200	146
