= Rock!!!!! =

Studio album by Violent Femmes
- Released: 1995
- Studio: DV's Perversion Room, Milwaukee, WI
- Genre: Rock
- Length: 32:04
- Label: Mushroom
- Producer: Brian Ritchie, Gordon Gano

Violent Femmes chronology
New Times (1994)	Rock!!!!! (1995)	Viva Wisconsin (1999)

Professional ratings
Review scores
Source	Rating
AllMusic	1.5/5 stars

Rock!!!!! is the seventh studio album released by Violent Femmes in 1995. It was originally released only in Australia, before becoming available in the rest of the world. It features cover photography by David LaChapelle. It was the first Violent Femmes album not to chart on the Billboard 200 since 1984's Hallowed Ground.

== Track listing ==
All tracks are written by Gordon Gano, except where noted.

Rock!!!!! track listing
No.	Title	Writer(s)	Length
1.	"Living a Lie"		2:23
2.	"Tonight"		1:55
3.	"Bad Dream"		3:31
4.	"I Danced"	Max Dunn, Gano	2:12
5.	"Thanksgiving (No Way Out)"		3:37
6.	"Dahmer Is Dead"		0:38
7.	"Life Is an Adventure"		2:53
8.	"She Went to Germany"		2:23
9.	"I Wanna See You Again"		2:45
10.	"Didgeriblues"	Gano, Brian Ritchie	2:33
11.	"Death Drugs"		3:11
12.	"Sweet Worlds of Angels"		4:03

== Personnel ==
- Gordon Gano – vocals, guitar, violin
- Brian Ritchie – bass, vocals, guitar, organ, didgeridoo, autoharp
- Guy Hoffman – drums, vocals
- David Vartanian – electric piano
- Bob Jennings – tenor and baritone sax, horn arrangement
- Pat Basler – alto sax
- Ed Spangenberg – trombone
- Sigmund Snopek III – mellotron
- Producers – Brian Ritchie, Gordon Gano
- Recording and mixing – David Vartanian

== Charts ==
Chart performance for Rock!!!!!
Chart (1995)	Peak position
Australian Albums (ARIA)	30
New Zealand Albums (RMNZ)	33
