= Ashwin Batish =

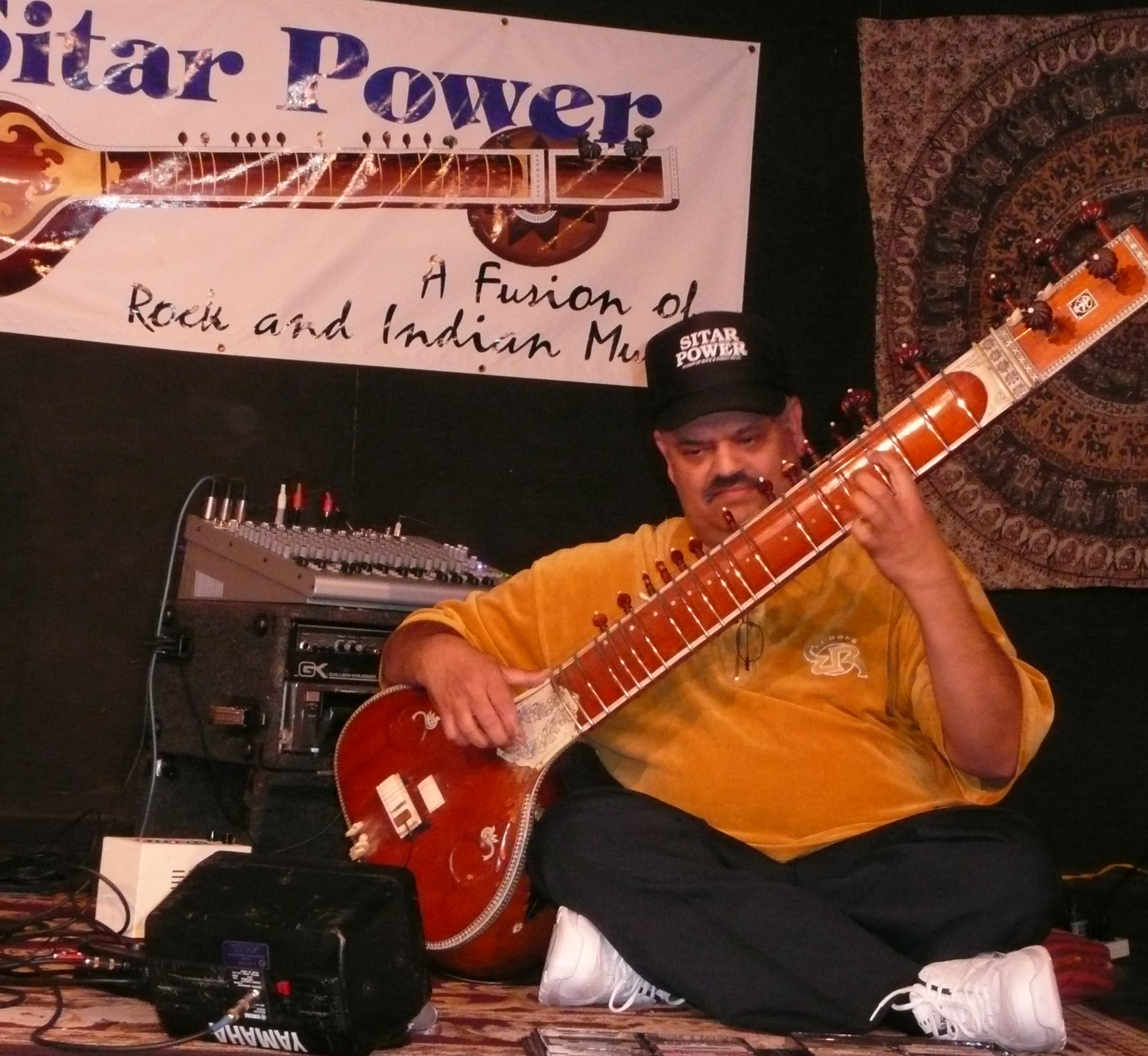
- Ashwin Batish in concert, 2009

Background information
- Born: 1 January 1951 (age 75); Bombay, India
- Genres: Fusion music, Worldbeat
- Occupation: Musician
- Instruments: sitar, tabla, dilruba, singing
- Years active: 1970 – present
- Label: Batish Records
- Website: Personal website

Ashwin Kumar Batish Hindi: अश्विन कुमार बातिश (born 1 January 1951 in Bombay, India) is an Indian sitar and tabla player.

== Childhood and Training ==
Ashwin's mother, Shanta Devi Batish, was an All India Radio artist and started Ashwin on the dholak drum around the age of seven and on the sitar around the age of 12.

== Musical Collaborations ==
Ashwin has worked with numerous artists including Zakir Hussain, Camper Van Beethoven, Violent Femmes, Brian Ritchie, Tony Trischka, Jimmy Carl Black, Myron Dove, Matthew Montfort Arthur Hull, Taylor Eigsti Teddy Andreadis, Butch Taylor, Diana Rowan, Johnny Griparic, Ant Glynne (Asia Band), Vanessa Vo, Brian Viglione, Gordon Gano, Eugene Chadbourne. Richie "Gajate" Garcia, Ronnie Montrose, Derek Sherinian

== Teaching ==
Ashwin also teaches Indian music courses at his own music school in Santa Cruz, California called the Batish Institute of Indian Music and Fine Arts. Ashwin publishes an online educational magazine called RagaNet, which gives lessons on instruments, history of Indian music and other articles on Indian musical instruments. Since his father's death in 2006, "Ashwin has devoted himself to publishing his father’s compositions–approximately 3000 on the Hindustani music system and 2500 on the Carnatic system–with the goal of making them fully available online. Shiv Dayal Batish composed many "Raga Lakshan Geet" introductory songs on North Indian ragas with both English and Sanskrit lyrics. Ashwin intends to publish these in an easily accessible text and audio format."

== Discography ==
- Sitar Power 1 - Fusion of Rock and Indian Music. Ashwin Batish on sitar, tabla, synths, drum programming, vocals. David Harnish on guitar and bass. Ravi Batish on vocals in Indian Beat. Original Batish Records (1986)
  1. Bombay Boogie (9:15)
  2. Casbah Shuffle (4:14)
  3. Raga Rock (4:50)
  4. Sitharmony (4:30)
  5. New Delhi Vice (8:08)
  6. India Beat (5:28)
  7. Sitar Magic ( 9:03)
- Sitar Power 2 - Fusion of Rock and Indian Music. Ashwin Batish on sitar, tabla, guitar, bass, synths, sequencing, vocals. David Harnish on guitar and bass. Original Batish Records (1994)
  1. Sitar Mania (4:19)
  2. Hi 5 (3:25)
  3. Cowboys and Indians (3:52)
  4. Cerebral (9:23)
  5. Surfing With The Sitarman (4:54)
  6. Misty (6:23)
  7. Tropicool (5:10)
  8. A Tabla For Two (4:10)
- Lies by Violent Femmes: Plays Sitar, Track 17. "Add It Up (1981–1993)" is a compilation album released by the Violent Femmes in 1993
- Lost in Space - Ashwin Batish on Sitar and Steve Masters on vocals, Single released by Tripindicalar Records (1990)
- Morning Mediation on Sitar by Ashwin Batish. S. D. Batish on tabla, released by Batish Records (1980)
  1. Raga Pahadi - Alaap (13:05)
  2. Raga Pahadi - Gat composition in Deepchandi Tal (11:25)
  3. Raga Vibhas - Alaap and Gat composition in Ektal (16:02)
  4. Raga Todi - Alaap and Gat composition in Tintal (16:32)
- Jazz Is Where Is Ashwin Batish Digital Single. New Release under Batish Records Label. Year 2016. Ashwin Batish on sitar, Keshav Batish on drum set and Myron Dove on Bass
- God of the Sun by Sons of Apollo. Played sitar and Indian percussion on title track of album Psychotic Symphony. Composed by Derek Sherinian
- Die Kobra by Derek Sherinian. Album Vortex. 2022 Release. Label: Inside Out Music – IOM639, Inside Out Music – 19658707362
