= Permanent Record: Live & Otherwise =

Video by Violent Femmes
- Released: July 12, 2005
- Length: 80 min.
- Label: Rhino

Violent Femmes chronology
Permanent Record: Live & Otherwise (2005)	No, Let's Start Over (2006)

Permanent Record: Live & Otherwise is a DVD released by Violent Femmes on July 12, 2005. The first thirteen tracks were filmed during a live concert at the Boat House in Norfolk, Virginia, on July 21, 1991. Tracks 14 through 20 are music videos. The last track is footage of an impromptu performance of "Kiss Off", in front of the Downer Theater in the band's hometown of Milwaukee, Wisconsin.

Duration: 80 minutes. Tracks 1 though 13: 49 minutes

As noted in the packaging of the DVD, the Boat House concert has become famous for the intense heat endured during the performance. An unusually hot east-coast summer during 1991 added together with the heat generated by equipment and lighting had created a temperature of 130 degrees Fahrenheit on-stage as measured with a thermometer. The band members performed in tank-tops while many members of the audience chose to go shirtless to deal with the heat.

== Track listing ==
1. "Look Like That"
2. "Out The Window"
3. "Fat"
4. "Blister in the Sun"
5. "Prove My Love"
6. "Country Death Song"
7. "Old Mother Reagan"
8. "Confessions"
9. "Girl Trouble"
10. "Add It Up"
11. "Kiss Off"
12. "Good Feeling"
13. "More Money Tonight"
14. "Gone Daddy Gone/I Just Want To Make Love To You"
15. "Children of the Revolution"
16. "I Held Her In My Arms"
17. "American Music"
18. "Used To Be"
19. "Breakin' Up"
20. "Machine"
21. "Kiss Off"

== Personnel ==
- Gordon Gano - guitar, vocals
- Brian Ritchie - bassist
- Victor DeLorenzo - drums
- Guy Hoffman - drums (tracks 19, 20)
- Caleb Alexander - saxophone (track 8)
