= New Times (album) =

Studio album by Violent Femmes
- Released: May 17, 1994
- Studio: DV's Perversion Room, Milwaukee, WI
- Genre: Rock
- Length: 50:20
- Label: Elektra
- Producer: Brian Ritchie, Gordon Gano

Violent Femmes chronology
Add It Up (1981-1993) (1993)	New Times (1994)	Rock!!!!! (1995)

Singles from New Times
- 1. "Machine" Released: 1994; 2. "Breakin' Up" Released: 1994

Professional ratings
Review scores
Source	Rating
Allmusic	2/5 stars
The Encyclopedia of Popular Music	2/5 stars
Entertainment Weekly	A−
The Rolling Stone Album Guide	2/5 stars

New Times is the sixth studio album by Violent Femmes, released in 1994, and the first not to feature original drummer Victor DeLorenzo on drums, who'd been replaced by Guy Hoffman. "Breakin' Up," a song lead singer Gordon Gano had written years before, was the lead single. Its video received minor airplay on MTV and appears on the band's DVD, Permanent Record - Live & Otherwise. The album did not sell well, but featured many of the Femmes' most musically complex and lyrically inventive songs, including "4 Seasons," and concert staple "I'm Nothing," which appeared in the movie Bickford Shmeckler's Cool Ideas.

== Track listing ==
All tracks are written by Gordon Gano, except where noted.

No.	Title	Writer(s)	Length
1.	"Don't Start Me on the Liquor"		4:08
2.	"New Times"	Walter Mehring, tr. Henry Marx, Gano	4:07
3.	"Breakin' Up"		4:00
4.	"Key of 2"		3:31
5.	"4 Seasons"		3:06
6.	"Machine"	Gano, Brian Ritchie	4:39
7.	"I'm Nothing"		2:35
8.	"When Everybody's Happy"	Gano, Ritchie	3:35
9.	"Agamemnon"	Walter Mehring, tr. Henry Marx, Gano	2:56
10.	"This Island Life"		5:31
11.	"I Saw You in the Crowd"		4:07
12.	"Mirror Mirror (I See a Damsel)"		4:30
13.	"Jesus of Rio"		3:35

== Personnel ==
Violent Femmes

- Gordon Gano – vocals (1–13), electric and acoustic guitars (1–5, 7–12), violin (8, 10), organ (13), baglama (12)
- Brian Ritchie – electric bass guitar (1, 2, 4, 9, 11), acoustic bass guitar (3, 5), upright bass (6, 8, 10, 12, 13), electric guitar (3), acoustic piano (4), electric piano (11), organ (9), reed organ (3, 12), electric sitar (2, 10), nose flute (4), theremin (6), keyboards (2, 6), electronics (6), baglama (12), vocals (1–5, 9, 12)
- Guy Hoffman – drums and percussion (1–5, 8–13), vocals (1–5, 8, 9, 11, 12)
- Luisa Mann – vocals (10)

== Charts ==
Chart performance for New Times
Chart (1994)	Peak position
Australian Albums (ARIA)	60
German Albums (Offizielle Top 100)	95
US Billboard 200	90
