= BBC Live (Violent Femmes album) =

Live album by Violent Femmes
- Released: August 2, 2005
- Recorded: May 1991
- Venue: The Town & Country Club, London
- Genre: Rock
- Length: 55:05
- Label: Hux Records

Violent Femmes chronology
| Permanent Record: The Very Best of Violent Femmes (2005) | BBC Live (2005) | Archive Series No. 1: Live in Iceland (2006) |

Professional ratings
Review scores
| Source | Rating |
|---|---|
| Allmusic | 3/5 stars |

BBC Live is a live album by Violent Femmes recorded in May 1991 at The Town & Country Club in London for BBC Radio 1's In Concert series, and broadcast on 20 July 1991. It was released on Hux Records in 2005.

== Track listings ==
All tracks are written by Gordon Gano.

| No. | Title | Length |
|---|---|---|
| 1. | "Look Like That" | 3:04 |
| 2. | "Promise" | 2:55 |
| 3. | "Out the Window" | 3:11 |
| 4. | "Country Death Song" | 5:11 |
| 5. | "Prove My Love" | 2:57 |
| 6. | "Fat" | 2:05 |
| 7. | "Flamingo Baby" | 4:01 |
| 8. | "Good Feeling" | 4:17 |
| 9. | "Ugly" | 3:08 |
| 10. | "Gimme the Car" | 7:00 |
| 11. | "Blister in the Sun" | 3:10 |
| 12. | "American Music" | 3:54 |
| 13. | "Kiss Off" | 6:29 |
| 14. | "Life is a Scream" | 3:43 |

== Personnel ==
- Gordon Gano – vocals, guitar
- Brian Ritchie – bass, backing vocals
- Victor DeLorenzo – drums, backing vocals
