= 3 (Violent Femmes album) =

1989 studio album by Violent Femmes

Studio album by Violent Femmes
- Released: January 1989
- Studio: Carriage House, Stamford, CT and Home Base, NYC.
- Genre: Alternative rock; folk punk
- Length: 36:07
- Label: Slash
- Producer: Violent Femmes, Warren Bruleigh

Violent Femmes chronology
The Blind Leading the Naked (1986)	3 (1989)	Debacle: The First Decade (1990)

Singles from 3
- 1. "Nightmares" Released: 1989

Professional ratings
Review scores
Source	Rating
AllMusic	3.5/5 stars
The Encyclopedia of Popular Music	3/5 stars
MusicHound Rock: The Essential Album Guide	3/5 stars
Record Mirror	4/5 stars
Rolling Stone	4/5 stars
The Rolling Stone Album Guide	2.5/5 stars
Spin Alternative Record Guide	4/10

3 is the fourth studio album by U.S. punk-folk band Violent Femmes.

== Critical reception ==
Trouser Press wrote that "Gano’s songwriting and delivery have their usual odd character and some of the old passion, but the Femmes don’t seem to be making much progress or impact in any direction here." Chris Woodstra of AllMusic noted that the fans of the band's early days would "appreciate the slightly stripped-back acoustic production." The Los Angeles Times wrote that "3 often comes off as a pale, precious shadow of the Femmes’ 1983 debut album." The Rolling Stone Album Guide deemed the album "a jumbled stylistic grab bag."

== Track listing ==
All tracks are written by Gordon Gano.

No.	Title	Length
1.	"Nightmares"	3:32
2.	"Just Like My Father"	1:42
3.	"Dating Days"	3:14
4.	"Fat"	1:49
5.	"Fool in the Full Moon"	4:25
6.	"Nothing Worth Living For"	4:21
7.	"World We're Living In"	5:16
8.	"Outside the Palace"	2:38
9.	"Telephone Book"	1:41
10.	"Mother of a Girl"	2:41
11.	"Lies"	1:31
12.	"See My Ships"	3:17

== Personnel ==
- Gordon Gano – guitar, vocals
- Brian Ritchie – bass guitar
- Victor DeLorenzo – drums
- Sigmund Snopek III – keyboards
- Peter Balestrieri – baritone saxophone
- Warren A. Bruleigh – co-producer, engineer
- Matt Lane – assistant engineer, Carriage House
- Bill Smith – assistant engineer, Home Base
- Bernie Grundman – mastering

== Charts ==
Chart (1989)	Peak position
Australia (ARIA Charts)	64
United States (Billboard 200)	93
