= Why Do Birds Sing? =

Studio album by Violent Femmes
- Released: April 30, 1991
- Recorded: 1990
- Genre: Folk rock
- Length: 42:20
- Label: Reprise
- Producers: Violent Femmes, Michael Beinhorn

Violent Femmes chronology
Debacle: The First Decade (1990)	Why Do Birds Sing? (1991)	Add It Up (1981-1993) (1993)

Singles from Why Do Birds Sing?
- 1. "American Music" Released: 1991; 2. "Do You Really Want to Hurt Me" Released: 1991; 3. "Used to Be" Released: 1991

Professional ratings
Review scores
Source	Rating
AllMusic	4.5/5 stars
New Noise Magazine	4/5 stars
Pitchfork	7.9/10

Why Do Birds Sing? is the fifth studio album by Violent Femmes, released on April 30, 1991. It was the band's last album with original drummer Victor DeLorenzo, who left two years later to devote his time to acting, and was produced by Michael Beinhorn, best-known then for his work with Red Hot Chili Peppers on Mother's Milk and The Uplift Mofo Party Plan.

The album featured the single "American Music", which rose to number 2 on Billboard's Modern Rock chart during the week of May 18, 1991, and became a staple of the band's live shows.

== Track listing ==
All tracks are written by Gordon Gano, except where noted.

No.	Title	Writer(s)	Length
1.	"American Music"		3:49
2.	"Out the Window"		2:52
3.	"Look Like That"		2:45
4.	"Do You Really Want to Hurt Me?"	George O'Dowd, Mikey Craig, Roy Hay, Jon Moss, Gano	4:50
5.	"Hey Nonny Nonny"	Shepard Tonie, Gano	4:34
6.	"Used to Be"		3:38
7.	"Girl Trouble"		2:57
8.	"He Likes Me"		3:07
9.	"Life Is a Scream"		1:54
10.	"Flamingo Baby"		2:37
11.	"Lack of Knowledge"		1:54
12.	"More Money Tonight"		3:58
13.	"I'm Free"		3:25

Vinyl version (side one)
No.	Title	Writer(s)	Length
1.	"American Music"		3:49
2.	"Out the Window"		2:52
3.	"Look Like That"		2:45
4.	"Do You Really Want to Hurt Me?"	O'Dowd, Craig, Hay, Moss, Gano	4:50
5.	"Hey Nonny Nonny"	Tonie, Gano	4:34
6.	"Used to Be"		3:38

Vinyl version (side two)
No.	Title	Length
1.	"Girl Trouble"	2:57
2.	"He Likes Me"	3:07
3.	"Life Is a Scream"	1:54
4.	"Flamingo Baby"	2:37
5.	"Lack of Knowledge"	1:54
6.	"More Money Tonight"	3:58

Deluxe edition bonus tracks (disc 1)
No.	Title	Writer(s)	Length
14.	"Me and You"		3:06
15.	"Color Me Once" (Early version)	Gano, Brian Ritchie	4:46
16.	"4 Seasons" (Early version)		3:06
17.	"Breaking Up" (Early version)		4:23
18.	"American Made" (Alternate version)		3:41
19.	"Dance, Motherfucker, Dance!"	Voot Warnings, Glenn Rehse, John Frankovic	3:16

Deluxe edition bonus tracks (disc 2) – Live at The Boat House 1991
No.	Title	Length
1.	"Look Like That"	2:47
2.	"Out the Window"	3:09
3.	"Fat"	1:56
4.	"Blister in the Sun"	2:27
5.	"Prove My Love"	2:45
6.	"Country Death Song"	4:40
7.	"Old Mother Reagan"	0:38
8.	"Confessions"	8:46
9.	"Girl Trouble"	3:33
10.	"Add It Up"	5:56
11.	"Kiss It Off"	4:16
12.	"Good Feeling"	4:00
13.	"More Money Tonight"	4:07

Deluxe edition bonus tracks (digital)
No.	Title	Writer(s)	Length
14.	"Me and You"		3:06
15.	"Color Me Once" (Early version)	Gano, Ritchie	4:46
16.	"4 Seasons" (Early version)		3:06
17.	"Breaking Up" (Early version)		4:23
18.	"American Made" (Alternate version)		3:41
19.	"Dance, Motherfucker, Dance!"	Warnings, Rehse, Frankovic	3:16
20.	"Look Like That" (Live at The Boat House)		2:47
21.	"Out the Window" (Live at The Boat House)		3:09
22.	"Fat" (Live at The Boat House)		1:56
23.	"Blister in the Sun" (Live at The Boat House)		2:27
24.	"Prove My Love" (Live at The Boat House)		2:45
25.	"Country Death Song" (Live at The Boat House)		4:40
26.	"Old Mother Reagan" (Live at The Boat House)		0:38
27.	"Confessions" (Live at The Boat House)		8:46
28.	"Girl Trouble" (Live at The Boat House)		3:33
29.	"Add It Up" (Live at The Boat House)		5:56
30.	"Kiss Off" (Live at The Boat House)		4:16
31.	"Good Feeling" (Live at The Boat House)		4:00
32.	"More Money Tonight" (Live at The Boat House)		4:07

== Personnel ==
=== Violent Femmes ===
- Gordon Gano – vocals, guitar
- Brian Ritchie – bass, guitar, bouzouki, banjo, ukulele, mouth harp, didgeridoo, xylophone, glockenspiel, vocals
- Victor DeLorenzo – drums, percussion, tranceaphone, vocals

=== Additional musicians ===
- Michael Beinhorn – Hammond organ on "American Music", Mellotron on "Do You Really Want to Hurt Me" and "Used to Be", piano on "Do You Really Want to Hurt Me" and "I'm Free", harmonium on "Used to Be"
- Sid Page, Suzie Katayama, Ilene Novog, Larry Corbett – strings on "Used to Be"
- Tommy Mandel – keyboards on "American Music"

=== Production ===
- Violent Femmes – Producer
- Eric "ET" Thorngren – Engineer, mixing
- David Vartanian – Mixing
- Susan Rogers – Engineer
- Tom Fritze – Assistant engineer
- Lori Fumar – Assistant engineer
- Mike Kloster – Assistant engineer
- Howie Weinberg – Mastering
- Mary Jones – Photography

== Charts ==
Chart performance for Why Do Birds Sing?
Chart (1991)	Peak position
Australian Albums (ARIA)	26
German Albums (Offizielle Top 100)	67
New Zealand Albums (RMNZ)	31
US Billboard 200	141

== Certifications ==
Region	Certification	Certified units/sales
Australia (ARIA)	Gold	35,000^{^}
^{^} Shipments figures based on certification alone.
