= Archive Series =

Archive Series may refer to:

- Archive Series Volume No. 1, an album by Iron & Wine
- Archive Series No. 1: Live in Iceland, an album by Violent Femmes
- Archive Series No. 2: Live in Chicago Q101, an album by Violent Femmes
- Archive Series (The Korgis album)
