= Debacle: The First Decade =

Compilation album by Violent Femmes
- Released: 1990
- Studio: Music Works, London
- Genre: Rock
- Length: 47:53
- Label: Slash
- Producer: Warren A. Bruleigh

Violent Femmes chronology
3 (1988)	Debacle: The First Decade (1990)	Why Do Birds Sing? (1991)

Professional ratings
Review scores
Source	Rating
AllMusic	4.5/5 stars

Debacle: The First Decade is a compilation released by Violent Femmes in 1990.

== Track listing ==
All tracks are written by Gordon Gano, except where noted.

No.	Title	Writer(s)	Length
1.	"Gimme the Car"		5:06
2.	"Nightmares"		3:34
3.	"Black Girls"		5:43
4.	"Add It Up"		4:44
5.	"Children of the Revolution"	Marc Bolan	4:20
6.	"Good Feeling"		3:52
7.	"Gone Daddy Gone"		3:06
8.	"Fat"		1:49
9.	"Old Mother Reagan"		0:32
10.	"Blister in the Sun"		2:26
11.	"Country Death Song"		5:04
12.	"Ugly"		2:21
13.	"World We're Living In"		5:16

== Personnel ==
Violent Femmes

- Gordon Gano – vocals, guitar
- Brian Ritchie – bass, vocals
- Victor DeLorenzo – drums, vocals

== Charts ==
Chart (1990)	Peak position
Australian Albums (ARIA)	39
New Zealand Albums (RMNZ)	41
