= Something's Wrong (album) =

Compilation album by Violent Femmes
- Released: August 2001
- Genre: Alternative rock; punk rock
- Length: 68:30
- Label: eMusic.com

Violent Femmes chronology
Freak Magnet (2000)	Something's Wrong (2001)	Permanent Record: The Very Best of Violent Femmes (2005)

Something's Wrong is a compilation album of studio recordings and unreleased live tracks by Violent Femmes in 2001. Tracks 1 and 3-12 are studio recordings from 1995 to 1997. Some songs are alternate versions of previously released songs. Tracks 16-22 are live recordings selected from the 1999 Viva Wisconsin sessions. Tracks 2 and 13-15 are demos recorded in 1995 and 1996.

The album was released only in MP3 format, by the online store eMusic.com.

== Track listing ==
No.	Title	Length
1.	"Positively 4th St."	2:55
2.	"12 Steps"	3:36
3.	"All I Want" (Alternate Version)	4:36
4.	"Yes, Oh, Yes"	2:23
5.	"My Way"	2:43
6.	"Rules Of Success"	3"05
7.	"Every Breath You Take"	2:18
8.	"Raquel"	3:00
9.	"Hollywood Is High" (Alternate Version)	2:24
10.	"I Want To See You Again"	2:47
11.	"Reckless Stones"	4:41
12.	"Requiem"	2:52
13.	"Washtub Bender"	3:28
14.	"Procession"	1:39
15.	"Something's Wrong"	2:22
16.	"36-24-36"	2:07
17.	"Out The Window"	3:15
18.	"Werewolf"	4:03
19.	"I Know It's True, But I'm Sorry To Say"	4:36
20.	"Fat"	2:05
21.	"Waiting For The Bus"	2:41
22.	"Herbsttag"	1:53

== Personnel ==
- Gordon Gano – Lead vocals, guitar
- Brian Ritchie – Bass, keyboards, baglama, didgeridoo, vocal
- Guy Hoffman – Drums, vocal, percussion

Additional musicians

- Petra Haden – Violin (track 3)
- Pierre Henry – Musique Concrete composition and arrangement (track 11)
- Violent Femmes – Sounds and samples (track 11)
- Sigmund Snopek III – Piano (track 19), flute (track 22)
