= Archive Series No. 1: Live in Iceland =

Live album by Violent Femmes
- Released: July 27, 2006
- Recorded: April 22, 2004
- Venue: Broadway, Hotel Island
- Genre: Rock
- Length: 38:49
- Label: Add It Up Productions
- Producer: Hjörtur Svavarssob and Birgir Jon Birgisson

Violent Femmes chronology
BBC Live (2005)	Archive Series No. 1: Live in Iceland (2006)	Archive Series No. 2: Live in Chicago Q101 (2006)

Professional ratings
Review scores
Source	Rating
AllMusic	3.5/5 stars

Archive Series No. 1: Live in Iceland is a live album performed in Iceland on April 22, 2004 and released by Violent Femmes in 2006.

== Track listing ==
All tracks are written by Gordon Gano.

No.	Title	Length
1.	"Confessions"	11:55
2.	"Black Girls"	4:44
3.	"More Money Tonight"	5:02
4.	"I Held Her in My Arms"	4:40
5.	"Waiting for the Bus"	3:54
6.	"Add it Up"	8:34

== Personnel ==
- Gordon Gano – vocals, guitar
- Brian Ritchie – bass, shakuhachi, backing vocals
- Victor DeLorenzo – drums, percussion, backing vocals

=== The Horns of Dilemma ===
- Matthias M.D. Hemstock – percussion
- Oskar Godjonnson – tenor saxophone
- Darren Brown – pocket trumpet
- Jarrod "Hollywood" Olman – alto saxophone
