= Plasticland =

American rock band

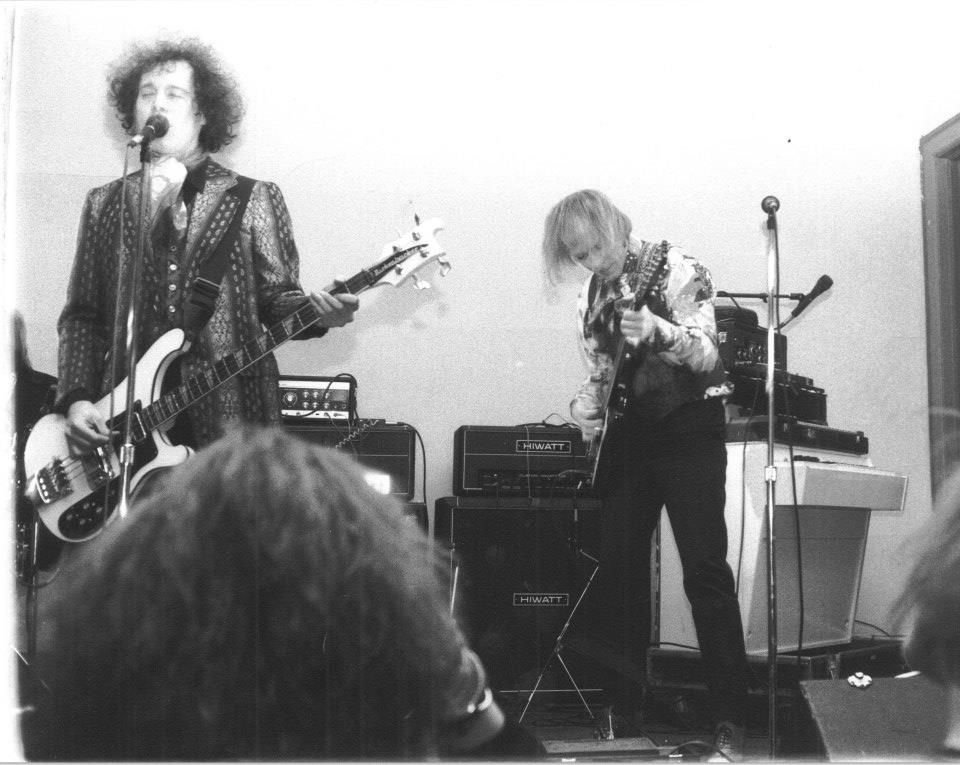
- Plasticland (1987)

Background information
- Origin: Wisconsin, United States
- Genres: Psychedelic rock
- Years active: 1980–present
- Members: Glenn Rehse; John Frankovic
- Past members: see list

Plasticland is an American neo-psychedelia and garage rock revival band formed in Milwaukee, Wisconsin, in 1980 by two members of Arousing Polaris, Glenn Rehse and John Frankovic.

== Career ==
Several guitarists and drummers would rotate in and out of the band over time, but Glenn Rehse and John Frankovic have remained the core of the band. Dan Mullen was the second guitarist for most of the 1980s recordings and live appearances. Brian Ritchie, later of the Violent Femmes, played guitar briefly with the band on early recordings. Multiple singles, EPs, compilation appearances, studio and live albums appeared in the 1980s and early 1990s. Several compilation CDs chronicle the band's earlier years.

Color Appreciation (1984), their first album, was on the French Lolita label. Enigma Records in the US reissued the album in 1985, self-titling it, with track alterations and substitutions. Enigma subsidiary label Pink Dust released the next two albums, Wonder Wonderful Wonderland (1985) and Salon (1987). For Wonder Wonderful Wonderland the label wanted the band to use Paul B. Cutler, a producer and guitar player with the Dream Syndicate, but the band "generally ignored his advice". German label Repulsion issued their final studio album Dapper Snappings in 1994, though it was recorded several years earlier. Two very different live albums were also released; You Need a Fairy Godmother (1989) and Confetti (1990) were both issued by Midnight Records. The former was recorded with Plasticland backing one of their musical heroes Twink, drummer for the Pretty Things and the Pink Fairies. Confetti consists of various live performances edited together.

The duo of Glenn Rehse and John Frankovic, with new bandmates, are still performing, having opened for Blue Cheer in November 2007. In January 2008, John Frankovic and Victor Demichei retired their services from the group. The group has been sustained by Glenn Rehse and new guitarist Leroy Buth (previously of the legendary Milwaukee punk rock group the Lubricants). In 2024, Plasticland released Spree, which was recorded in 2006 and 2013. The 2006 session featured Frankovic and original drummer Victor Demichei. The 2013 session featured Andy Kaiser on bass and Mike Koch on drums.

In 2015, Plasticland were inducted into the Wisconsin Area Music Industry Hall of Fame, along with artists Sigmund Snopek and the Robbs.

== Members ==
- Glenn Rehse – vocals, guitar, organ, lyrics
- John Frankovic – bass
- Dan Mullen – guitar
- Victor Demichei – drums
- Brian Ritchie – guitar (early years)
- Bob DuBlon – (early years)
- Breck Burns – (early years)
- Rob McCuen – (later years)
- Dave Raeck – bass (1998; 2007)
- Leroy Buth – guitar (2006–present)
- Mike Koch – drums (2009–present)
- Andy Kaiser – bass (2009–present)

== Side projects ==
Both Glenn Rehse and John Frankovic have had various side projects, releasing multiple albums and singles. As the Fabulon Triptometer, Glenn Rehse released The Padded Lounge (1992) on Midnight Records with Bob DuBlon on drums. John Frankovic has multiple solo albums to his credit: Under the Water Lily (1993) on Midnight Records, Frank-O-Fest (1995) on Father Yod Records and in 2004 Brainticket Records released Space Zombie. As well, he has issued multiple singles with the Gothics and the Cake People. Both have produced albums for other artists, including Dimentia 13 and the Petals.

== Discography ==
=== Albums ===
- Plasticland (Enigma - 1984 - Color Appreciation French version by Lolita Records)
- Wonder Wonderful Wonderland (Pink Dust) - (1985)
- Salon (Pink Dust) - (1987)
- You Need a Fairy Godmother (Midnight) - (Live LP with Twink of Pretty Things/Pink Fairies fame) - (1989)
- Confetti (Midnight) - (Live LP) - (1990)
- Dapper Snappings (Repulsion) - (1994)
- Spree (Scadillac) - (2024)

=== EPs ===
- Vibrasonics From Plasticland (Scadillac) - (1981)
- Pop! Op Drops (Scadillac) - (1982)
- Let's Play Pollyanna (Repulsion) - 4-song CD - (1990)

=== Singles ===
- Mink Dress / Office Skills (Scadillac) - (1980)
- Color Appreciation / The Mushroom Hill (Scadillac) - (1981)
- Euphoric Trapdoor Shoes / Rattail Comb (Scadillac) - (1983)
- Magic Rocking Horse / Magic Rocking Horse (Lolita) - promo only - (1984)
- Flower Scene / In My Black and White (Midnight) - (1985)
- They Wore Sequined Masks / The Lady Is No Lady / Some Ghost Ship Lollipop (one sided hard vinyl test pressing) - (1986)
- Seize The Time / Iris Of The Waterfall (Polaris/Repulsion) - test pressing only - (1989)
- Let's Play Pollyanna / Enchanted Forestry (Repulsion) - 7" version - (1990)
- Let's Play Pollyanna / Radiant Fuzzbox Wig / Kaleidoscopic Glance (Repulsion) - 12" version - (1990)

=== Retrospectives ===
- Pop! Op Drops (bootleg /w. all 14 tracks from Scadillac 7"-es) - (lim. ed. of 100 #ed copies) - (19??) (10")
- Mink Dress and Other Cats (Timothy's Brain) - (1995) (CD)
- Plasticland (Hardknocks) - (2000) (CD)
- Make Yourself A Happening Machine: A Collection (Rykodisc) - (2006) (CD)
