= Archive Series No. 2: Live in Chicago Q101 =

Archive Series No. 2: Live In Chicago Q101

Live album (in studio) by Violent Femmes
- Released: September 2006
- Recorded: April 22, 2000
- Genre: Rock
- Length: 31:53
- Label: Add It Up Productions
- Producer: Chicago Recording Company

Violent Femmes chronology
Archive Series No. 1: Live in Iceland (2006)	Archive Series No. 2: Live In Chicago Q101 (2006)	Happy New Year (2015)

Archive Series No. 2: Live In Chicago Q101 is a live broadcast 'studio' album performed in Chicago on April 22, 2000 and released by Violent Femmes in 2006. Includes banter between selections.

== Track listing ==
All tracks are written by Gordon Gano.

No.	Title	Length
1.	"Freak Magnet"
2.	"Rejoice and Be Happy"
3.	"Country Death Song"
4.	"Blister in the Sun"
5.	"I'm Nothing"
6.	"In the Dark"
8.	"All I Want"
9.	"American Music"

== Personnel ==
- Gordon Gano – vocals, acoustic guitar
- Brian Ritchie – acoustic bass guitar, backing vocals
- Guy Hoffman – snare drum, percussion, backing vocals

Additional musicians

- Hani Naser – Arabic percussion (tracks 6,7,8)
- Sigmund Snopek III – piano, flute (tracks 6,7,8)
