= Permanent Record =

Permanent Record may refer to:

- Permanent Record (autobiography), 2019 autobiography by Edward Snowden
- Permanent Record (novel), 2019 young adult novel by Mary H.K. Choi
- Permanent Record (film), 1988 American drama
- Permanent Record: Al in the Box, a four-disc compilation boxed set by "Weird Al" Yankovic
- Permanent Record: Live & Otherwise, 2005 live concert DVD by the Violent Femmes
- Permanent Record: The Very Best of Violent Femmes, 2005 greatest hits album by the Violent Femmes
- A term for a student's school transcript

== See also ==
- Permanent Records, a former Australian record label
