= 2 Mics & the Truth =

Live album by Violent Femmes
- Released: July 7, 2019
- Genre: Alternative rock
- Length: 72:30 [CD] 92:44 [digital] 89:46 [2LP]
- Label: Add It Up Productions, PIAS Recordings
- Producer: Brian Ritchie

Violent Femmes chronology
We Can Do Anything (2016)	2 Mics & the Truth (2019)	Hotel Last Resort (2019)

2 Mics & the Truth is the fifth live album by American rock band Violent Femmes. The album was released on July 7, 2017, by Add It Up Productions and PIAS Recordings. It was recorded at various radio stations and Paste Magazine. It was released on CD, 2-LP and digital download/streaming with differing track listings on each format.

Professional ratings
Review scores
Source	Rating
AllMusic	3.5/5 stars
Soundblab	9/10

== Track listings ==
All tracks are written by Gordon Gano, unless otherwise indicated.

CD track listing
No.	Title	Recording location	Length
1.	"Blister In The Sun"	WXRV	2:55
2.	"I'm Nothing"	PASTE	3:30
3.	"It's Gonna Rain"	PASTE	4:01
4.	"Breaking Up"	WFUV	4:38
5.	"Good For / At Nothing"	WFUV	2:35
6.	"American Music"	KINK	4:59
7.	"Gone Daddy Gone / I Just Want to Make Love to You" (Gordon Gano, Willie Dixon)	WXPN	3:11
8.	"I Could Be Anything"	WFUV	4:07
9.	"Rejoice And Be Happy"	KCMP	2:11
10.	"Add It Up"	WFUV	6:05
11.	"You Move Me"	WXPN	3:36
12.	"Issues"	KCMP	2:58
13.	"Run With It" (Spencer P. Jones)	WFUV	4:18
14.	"Ugly"	WXRV	2:33
15.	"Kiss Off"	WXRV	3:09
16.	"Jesus Walking On The Water"	WFUV	5:09
17.	"Prove My Love"	WFUV	2:54
18.	"Country Death Song"	WFUV	5:03
19.	"Untrue Love"	PASTE	4:31

Digital track listing
No.	Title	Recording location	Length
1.	"Blister in the Sun"	WXRV	2:55
2.	"I'm Nothing"	PASTE	3:30
3.	"It's Gonna Rain"	PASTE	4:01
4.	"Breaking Up"	WFUV	4:38
5.	"Traveling Solves Everything"	KINK	3:20
6.	"Good For / At Nothing"	WFUV	2:35
7.	"Memory"	KINK	2:59
8.	"American Music"	KINK	4:59
9.	"Gone Daddy Gone / I Just Want to Make Love to You" (Gordon Gano, Willie Dixon)	WXPN	3:11
10.	"Love Love Love Love Love" (Jake Brebes)	KCMP	3:52
11.	"Big Car"	WXPN	2:52
12.	"Untrue Love"	PASTE	4:31
13.	"I Could Be Anything"	WFUV	4:07
14.	"Rejoice and Be Happy"	KCMP	2:11
15.	"Add It Up"	WFUV	6:05
16.	"No Killing"	WYEP	3:27
17.	"You Move Me"	WXPN	3:36
18.	"Issues"	KCMP	2:58
19.	"Run With It" (Spencer P. Jones)	WFUV	4:18
20.	"Ugly"	WXRV	2:33
21.	"Kiss Off"	WXRV	3:09
22.	"Jesus Walking on the Water"	WFUV	5:02
23.	"Prove My Love"	WFUV	2:54
24.	"Country Death Song"	WFUV	5:03
25.	"What You Really Mean"	WXPN	3:58

The 2-LP release track listing is the same as the digital release, except for omitting the track "Issues".

== Personnel ==
- Gordon Gano – lead vocals, guitar, banjo, fiddle
- Brian Ritchie – acoustic bass guitar, vocals
- John Sparrow – BBQ, cajón, vocals
- Blaise Garza – baritone saxophone, cabasa, vocals
- Jeff Hamilton – mandolin, guitar, ukulele, vocals
- Mike Kasprzak – percussion, vocals
- Tony Trischka – Banjo on "Add it Up", "Jesus Walking on the Water", and "Country Death Song"
- Dan Nosheny – Tuba on "Gone Daddy Gone" and "You Move Me"
- Billy Ficca – cajón on "Run with It"
