= The Blind Leading the Naked =

Studio album by Violent Femmes
- Released: August 16, 1986
- Recorded: July – September 1985
- Genre: Rock; alternative rock
- Length: 37:36
- Label: Slash
- Producer: Jerry Harrison

Violent Femmes chronology
Hallowed Ground (1984)	The Blind Leading the Naked (1986)	3 (1988)

Singles from The Blind Leading the Naked
- 1. "Children of the Revolution" Released: 1986; 2. "I Held Her in My Arms" Released: 1986

Professional ratings
Review scores
Source	Rating
AllMusic	4/5 stars

The Blind Leading the Naked is the third album by Violent Femmes. It was produced by Jerry Harrison of Talking Heads and released in 1986. The title is a play on the figure of speech "the blind leading the blind."

The Blind Leading the Naked was the band's first album to reach the Billboard 200 chart, peaking at number 84, and its only one to chart in Britain.

A version labeled Remastered 2026 with release date April 10, 2026 appeared for download only at Bandcamp.com and streaming on Amazon Music and includes previously import-only bonus track "World Without Mercy" as the final song. A yellow color-vinyl release scheduled for Record Store Day in U.S.A., Saturday, April 18, 2026 appears not to include the extra song.

== Production and recording ==
The band said Leo Kottke and Fred Frith were both persuaded to appear on the album after approaching them at their concerts. "I just went along and asked him if he'd like to come down and try something out in the studio," Ritchie said of Frith.

Members of the band said they were unhappy with the choice of Harrison as producer, with Ritchie saying, "We knew Jerry and he'd seen us live and, uh, he didn't like it... And when I heard the reasons that he didn't like it, well, they were the reasons why we do like it! We didn't think he was right to produce music as weird as ours." Gano further claimed that Harrison had been suggested by Warners "solely on the basis that he lives in Milwaukee, because we'd stipulated to them that we had to record there. This was outrageous from their point of view." Elsewhere, Gano added, "We've always been really sloppy. On this album we tried to clean it up a little bit. That's what Jerry's into. He's interested in what would be considered technically a good sound."

== Reception ==
AllMusic gave the album a positive review, stating the album was a "more mainstream effort" that "rocks harder" than previous albums. People gave a positive review, stating "the group maintains enough humor and angst to keep even their religious songs fresh.... This third album gives more evidence that the Violent Femmes rank with the very best bands of the 1980s," while singling out the song "Breakin' Hearts" as a highlight. However, in a retrospective of their debut album, The Atlantic mentions The Blind Leading the Naked as "their first unmitigated disaster, a crassly commercial piece of pandering."

Spin said, "This is a great album, one that may finally earn the Violent Femmes the attention they deserve. If you already like them, swell, but if you've never heard them before, you might play the second side a few times first before hitting the less accessible side one."

== Track listing ==
All tracks are written by Gordon Gano, except where noted.

No.	Title	Writer(s)	Length
1.	"Old Mother Reagan"		0:31
2.	"No Killing"		5:13
3.	"Faith"		4:14
4.	"Breakin' Hearts"		2:15
5.	"Special"		2:18
6.	"Love & Me Make Three"	Brian Ritchie, Victor DeLorenzo	2:53
7.	"Candlelight Song"		3:11
8.	"I Held Her in My Arms"		2:52
9.	"Children of the Revolution"	Marc Bolan	4:19
10.	"Good Friend"		3:28
11.	"Heartache"		2:02
12.	"Cold Canyon"		3:22
13.	"Two People"		0:58

Cassette and import CD bonus track
No.	Title	Writer(s)	Length
7.	"World Without Mercy"	Victor DeLorenzo	4:06

== Personnel ==
=== Violent Femmes ===
- Gordon Gano – lead vocals, acoustic and electric guitars
- Brian Ritchie – acoustic and electric bass guitars, electric guitar, jaw harp, slide whistle, vocals
- Victor DeLorenzo – drums, percussion, tortoise, vocals

=== Additional musicians ===
- Jerry Harrison – keyboards, guitar, melodica
- Fred Frith – homemade instruments, guitar
- Leo Kottke – acoustic 10-string guitar
- Sigmund Snopek III – keyboards
- Peter Balestrieri – alto saxophone
- Steve Mackay – saxophone
- Steve Scales – percussion
- Abdulhamid Alwan – tabla, daf
- Junior Brantley – keyboards
- Jim Liban – harmonica
- Bill Schaefgen – trombone
- Drake Scott – vocalizing

== Charts ==
Chart (1986)	Peak position
Australia (Kent Music Report)	31
United Kingdom (Official Charts Company)	81
United States (Billboard 200)	84

== See also ==
- Ronald Reagan in music
