= Debacle =

Debacle may refer to:

- an event that turns out to be a disaster
- Debacle: The First Decade, an album by the Violent Femmes
- La Débâcle, a novel by Émile Zola
- Debacle, a 2009 Nike SB skateboarding video
