= Freak Magnet =

Studio album by Violent Femmes
- Released: February 22, 2000
- Studios: Big House, Soundtrack, Odin, Son/Re, DV's Perversion Room, Milwaukee, WI, Nine Lives
- Genre: Rock
- Length: 44:49
- Label: Beyond
- Producers: Warren Bruleigh, Violent Femmes, Pierre Henry, Tom Grimley

Violent Femmes chronology
Viva Wisconsin (1999)	Freak Magnet (2000)	Something's Wrong (2001)

Professional ratings
Review scores
Source	Rating
AllMusic	3/5 stars
The Austin Chronicle	2.5/5 stars
The Encyclopedia of Popular Music	3/5 stars

Freak Magnet is the eighth studio album by Violent Femmes, released in 2000. It contains the single "Sleepwalkin'."

Originally planned for a 1998 release on Interscope Records, Freak Magnet was pulled when the band was dropped from the label. A reissue with live bonus tracks were released via Shout! Factory in 2005.

== Critical reception ==
The Washington Post called the album "stuck in the Reagan decade," writing that "the Femmes still play punky hootenanny-rock with occasional potty-mouthed lyrics to assure frat-boy appeal." Exclaim! wrote that the Violent Femmes "tend to sound like an average band dabbling in a goofy brand of punk, save for Gordon Gano's voice, which anyone could spot a mile away." Paste's Andrew Lisle wrote: "With sarcastic, solid originals like 'Happiness Is' and 'Hollywood Is High', the boys try to achieve former glory on Freak Magnet, falling just short of success." Trouser Press called it "a strong return to form," writing that "the Femmes hang their music in thick, hard-rocking sheets of sound rather than on a skeletal acoustic frame."

== Track listing ==
All tracks are written by Gordon Gano, except where noted.

2000 Cooking Vinyl album track listing
No.	Title	Writer(s)	Length
1.	"Hollywood Is High"		2:22
2.	"Freak Magnet"		2:35
3.	"Sleepwalkin'"		2:21
4.	"All I Want"		3:32
5.	"New Generation"	Rose Marie McCoy, Albert Ayler, Mary Parks	2:38
6.	"In the Dark"		3:50
7.	"Rejoice and Be Happy"		2:11
8.	"Mosh Pit"	Gano, Brian Ritchie	2:13
9.	"Forbidden"	William Carlos Williams, Gano	2:59
10.	"When You Died"		2:34
11.	"At Your Feet"		2:51
12.	"I Danced"	Max Dunn, Gano	2:43
13.	"I'm Bad"		2:42
14.	"Happiness Is"		4:18
15.	"A Story"	Gano, Ritchie	5:00

2005 Shout! Factory reissue bonus tracks
No.	Title	Writer(s)	Length
16.	"Rejoice And Be Happy" (live)		2:24
17.	"Freak Magnet" (live)		2:34
18.	"Positively 4th Street" (live)	Bob Dylan	3:56

1998 Interscope promo CD track listing
No.	Title	Length
1.	"I'm Bad"	2:42
2.	"Freak Magnet"	2:37
3.	"All I Want"	4:09
4.	"Rejoice and Be Happy"	2:11
5.	"I Wanna See You Again"	2:43
6.	"I'm Nothing"	2:24
7.	"Positively 4th Street" (Bob Dylan)	2:52
8.	"A Story" (featuring Pierre Henry) (Gano, Brian Ritchie)	4:58
9.	"Happiness Is"	4:20
10.	"Forbidden" (William Carlos Williams, Gano)	2:55
11.	"Mosh Pit" (Gano, Ritchie)	2:13
12.	"Yes Oh Yes"	3:22
13.	"When You Died"	2:34
14.	"Requiem"	3:48
15.	"Reckless Stones" (Special bonus composition featuring Pierre Henry)	4:41

== Personnel ==
=== Violent Femmes ===
- Gordon Gano – vocal, guitar
- Brian Ritchie – bass, guitar, keyboards, percussion, shakuhachi, vocal, additional recording, cover design
- Guy Hoffman – drums, percussion, vocal

=== Technical personnel ===
- Violent Femmes – co-producer
- Warren Bruleigh – co-producer, mixing, additional recording
- Pierre Henry – co-producer, additional recording
- Tom Grimley – co-producer, additional recording
- Martin Brass – recording, mixing
- David Vartanian – mixing, cover design
- Howie Weinberg – mastering
- Roger Lian – mastering
- Bill Emmons – additional recording
- Mark Mason – assistant engineer
- Ken Feldman – assistant engineer
- Rich Tapper – assistant engineer
- Nicola Stemmer – assistant engineer
