= Guy Hoffman =

American drummer

- Born: May 20, 1954 (age 72); Milwaukee, Wisconsin, U.S.
- Occupation: Musician
- Spouse: Jeanne Marie Spicuzza

Guy Hoffman (born May 20, 1954) is an American drummer and vocalist, formerly of such bands as Oil Tasters, BoDeans, Violent Femmes, Absinthe and Radio Romeo. He is a composer for films such as Field Day.

== Life ==
Hoffman began playing drums at the age of nine. He developed skills in music and art under the direction of Eddie Allen, Sylvia Spicuzza, LeRoy Augustine, and Joe Ferrara within the Shorewood public school system. From 1972 to 1976, Hoffman concentrated on watercolor painting and drawing under professor Laurence Rathsack in the University of Wisconsin–Milwaukee (UWM) Fine Arts programs. He also played popular music with local bands at live music venues throughout Wisconsin. From 1977 to 1978, Hoffman studied graphic arts with Leon Travanti and graduated from UWM with a Bachelor of Arts in fine art and visual communications.

== Music career ==
Hoffman was a founding member of the Haskels and Oil Tasters, bands in Milwaukee's punk scene. He was an original member of the Milwaukee roots rock band BoDeans and performs on their 1986 debut album Love & Hope & Sex & Dreams. Hoffman appeared in videos for the BoDeans songs "She's a Runaway" and "Fadeaway". In 1998, he reunited with BoDeans singer/songwriter Sam Llanas to form the band Absinthe and released A Good Day to Die.

Hoffman joined Violent Femmes in 1993. Two versions of "Blister in the Sun", the Femmes' signature song, were recorded with Hoffman for the Grosse Pointe Blank motion picture soundtrack in 1997. Hoffman has appeared with Violent Femmes in various concert films and television productions, such as "Woodstock '94," Sabrina the Teenage Witch and VH-1's Hard Rock Live, as well as several of the band's music videos. Hoffman also designed the cover for the Femmes' 1994 album New Times.

Hoffman plays drums on the CD Jeanne Spicuzza (2001). The track "Let the Mermaids Flirt With Me" appears in the 2004 short film Field Day. In 2002, he was replaced in the Femmes by returning original drummer Victor DeLorenzo. In 2006, Hoffman formed Radio Romeo, a Los Angeles-based rock band, who released their self-titled debut album the following year. He also appeared on Violent Femmes' 2006 live album Archive Series No. 2: Live in Chicago Q101. In 2022, he composed music for the film, Night Rain.

== Discography ==
With Violent Femmes

- New Times (1994)
- Woodstock 94 (1994) – various artists
- Rock!!!!! (1995)
- Grosse Pointe Blank: Music from the Film (1997)
- Viva Wisconsin (1999)
- Freak Magnet (2000)
- History in 3 Chords (2001) – various artists
- Something's Wrong (2001)
- Permanent Record: The Very Best of Violent Femmes (2005)
- Permanent Record: Live & Otherwise (2005)
- Archive Series No. 2: Live in Chicago Q101 (2006)

With other artists

- The Haskels – The Haskels (1979)
- Oil Tasters – Oil Tasters (1982)
- BoDeans – Love & Hope & Sex & Dreams (1986)
- Various artists – The Great Lost Brew Wave Album (1997)
- Absinthe – A Good Day to Die (1998)
- Jeanne Spicuzza – Jeanne Spicuzza (2001)
- Radio Romeo – Radio Romeo (2007)
