= Hotel Last Resort =

Studio album by Violent Femmes
- Released: July 26, 2019
- Recorded: 2019
- Genre: Alternative rock
- Length: 38:03
- Label: Add It Up Productions, PIAS Recordings
- Producer: Ted Hutt

Violent Femmes chronology
2 Mics & the Truth (2017)	Hotel Last Resort (2019)

Hotel Last Resort is the tenth studio album by American rock band Violent Femmes. The album was released on July 26, 2019, by Add It Up Productions and PIAS Recordings. The cover art is a picture of the Eastlink hotel sculpture in Australia.

== Critical reception ==
Professional ratings
Aggregate scores
Source	Rating
Metacritic	68/100
Review scores
Source	Rating
AllMusic	3.5/5 stars
American Songwriter	3.5/5 stars
Consequence of Sound	C−
Exclaim!	6/10
The Guardian	2/5 stars
Rolling Stone	3.5/5 stars
The Skinny	3/5 stars

Hotel Last Resort received generally positive reviews from critics. At Metacritic, which assigns a normalized rating out of 100 to reviews from critics, the album received an average score of 68, which indicates "generally favorable reviews", based on 12 reviews.

== Track listing ==
No.	Title	Length
1.	"Another Chorus"	2:38
2.	"I Get What I Want"	2:30
3.	"I'm Nothing" (featuring Stefan Janoski)	2:26
4.	"Adam Was a Man"	2:59
5.	"Not OK"	2:34
6.	"Hotel Last Resort" (featuring Tom Verlaine)	5:12
7.	"Everlasting You"	2:13
8.	"It's All or Nothing"	2:25
9.	"I'm Not Gonna Cry"	2:56
10.	"This Free Ride"	2:14
11.	"Paris to Sleep"	3:38
12.	"Sleepin' at the Meetin'"	1:38
13.	"God Bless America"	4:40
Total length:		38:03

== Personnel ==
- Gordon Gano – lead vocals, guitars
- Brian Ritchie – acoustic bass guitar, baritone guitar, percussion, vocals
- John Sparrow – drums, percussion, vocals
- Blaise Garza – contrabass, baritone and sopranino saxophones; piano, harmonium, theremin, vocals
- Tom Verlaine – guitar (track 6)
- Stefan Janoski – vocals (track 3)
- Aixa Vilar, Go Betty Go, Michelle Rangel, Nicolette Vilar, Todd Piotrowski – vocals (track 1)

== Charts ==
Chart (2019)	Peak position
US Independent Albums (Billboard)	29
