= Hallowed Ground (Violent Femmes album) =

Studio album by Violent Femmes
- Released: May 14, 1984
- Recorded: January 1984
- Studios: Secret Sound Studio, New York City
- Genres: Gospel rock; country; roots music
- Length: 38:57
- Label: Slash
- Producer: Mark Van Hecke

Violent Femmes chronology
Violent Femmes (1983)	Hallowed Ground (1984)	The Blind Leading the Naked (1986)

Singles from Hallowed Ground
- 1. "It's Gonna Rain" Released: 1984

Hallowed Ground is the second studio album by Violent Femmes, released on May 14, 1984. Like the band's first album, the songs were mostly written by singer/guitarist/lyricist Gordon Gano when he was in high school. "Country Death Song", for example, written by Gano during his high school classes, was inspired by the tradition of folk songs about "terrible, horrific stories". A stark and experimental departure from the relatively straightforward folk-rock style of their debut, Hallowed Ground was considerably divisive amongst fans and critics, with many at the time incorrectly thinking Gano's sincere Christian lyrics were ironic.

== Background ==
The songs on Hallowed Ground were written before the Violent Femnes’ first album. With multiple albums' worth of songs ready, the band decided to focus on more pop songs for their debut album and then “confuse people” with the more experimental songs that ended up as Hallowed Ground. They also stated a goal of "being unpredictable." "Country Death Song" was the first song Gano played to Brian Ritchie after meeting in high school.

The Christian-related lyrics on Hallowed Ground were thought by some to be ironic, despite Gano being a devout Baptist. The other two members of Violent Femmes were atheists, and initially refused to perform those songs, but after their debut had been recorded, they relented and several of Gano's religion-themed songs were recorded for Hallowed Ground. Gano stated in 1989, "At the time, Brian (Ritchie) was very aggressively anti-anything Christian. He said he didn't want to be playing in a band that was expressing something that he felt so vehemently against." Avant-garde musician John Zorn plays saxophone and clarinet on "Black Girls", and the group Horns of Dilemma perform clarinet and trombone on the rest of the album.

== Album artwork ==
The album artwork is a photo of a sculpture created by Mary Nohl.

== Reception ==
Professional ratings
Review scores
Source	Rating
AllMusic	4.5/5 stars
Rockol	4.5/5 stars
Spin Alternative Record Guide	6/10
The Village Voice	C+
The Vinyl District	A

AllMusic, in a 4.5 out of 5 star review, described the album as a "hellfire-and-brimstone-beaten exorcism that both enraged and enthralled critics and fans alike". Robert Christgau gave the album a negative review, stating "everything you might hum along with on the sequel was invented generations ago by better men than he", as well as criticizing the song "Black Girls" for perceived racism and homophobia.

Picthfork described the album as having "a subterranean mother lode of apocalyptic religion, murder, and madness that has lurked just under the surface of hillbilly music and blues since the 19th century". RAM agreed it was, "the dark side of country and hillbilly blues, at the same time skidding off on tangents that take in everything from neo-psychedelic to Beefheart to jazz" but also described the album as "remarkably cogent".

=== Legacy ===
Orlando Weekly described the album as both underrated and divisive. The Phoenix New Times, in a 30th anniversary look-back, called the album the band's "finest musical effort" and praised Gano's lyrics as his "definitive moment as a lyricist." They also stated the album was an early predictor of the alternative country movement.

Brian Ritchie was interviewed in 2018 about the album's divisive legacy:

People hated it. They hated it because there were a few Christian songs on there. Gordon's father was a minister. So that was something he was into. Vic and I weren't religious, but we thought it was funny to play those songs for a punk crowd and rub them the wrong way. To me, it's more punk to defy your audience than to play what they want to hear. But we lost our audience that way. Ironically, we had the material for both albums. We could've put out a double or put "Hallowed Ground" first and then the first album. We chose to make the first one a pop album and chose to make "Hallowed Ground" this sprawling exploration of American roots music. We're not considered in the Americana category.

— Brian Ritchie

Ritchie later revealed Hallowed Ground was the band's favorite album, and singled out "Never Tell" as his favorite song to play.

== Track listing ==
All tracks are written by Gordon Gano.

No.	Title	Length
1.	"Country Death Song"	5:02
2.	"I Hear the Rain"	1:32
3.	"Never Tell"	7:10
4.	"Jesus Walking on the Water"	3:07
5.	"I Know It's True but I'm Sorry to Say"	5:05
6.	"Hallowed Ground"	4:18
7.	"Sweet Misery Blues"	2:51
8.	"Black Girls"	5:41
9.	"It's Gonna Rain"	4:11

== Personnel ==
Violent Femmes

- Gordon Gano – vocals, acoustic guitar (1, 2, 4, 7, 9), electric guitar (3, 5, 6, 8), violin (4)
- Brian Ritchie – acoustic bass (1, 2, 4, 7, 9), electric bass (3, 5, 6, 8), slide bass (8), celesta (5), marimba (2), jews' harp (8), vocals (2, 3, 6, 7, 8, 9)
- Victor DeLorenzo – tranceaphone (1, 2, 4, 7, 8), acoustic and electric drum kits (1, 3, 5, 6, 8, 9), stompatron (8), percussion (8), vocals (all songs except 1)

Additional musicians

- Mark Van Hecke – piano on "Hallowed Ground" and "It's Gonna Rain", organ on "I Know That It's True but I'm Sorry to Say"
- Tony Trischka – banjo on "Country Death Song" and "It's Gonna Rain"
- Christina Houghton – autoharp on "Jesus Walking on the Water"
- Peter Balestrieri – vocals on "Jesus Walking on the Water", tenor saxophone on "Black Girls", harmonica on "It's Gonna Rain"
- Cynthia Gano Lewis – vocals on "Jesus Walking on the Water"
- Drake Scott – cornetto on "Black Girls", sackbut on "Sweet Misery Blues"
- John Zorn – alto saxophone, clarinet and game calls on "Black Girls"
- John Tanner – clarinet on "Sweet Misery Blues"
- Horns of Dilemma – clarinet and trombone

Production

- Mark Van Hecke – production
- John Tanner – engineering
- Warren Bruleigh – engineering

== Charts ==
Chart (1984)	Peak position
Australia (Kent Music Report)	56
