= Violent Femmes (album) =

1983 studio album by Violent Femmes

Studio album by Violent Femmes
- Released: April 13, 1983
- Recorded: July 1982
- Studios: Castle Recording Studios, Lake Geneva, Wisconsin
- Genres: Folk punk; post-punk; alternative rock
- Length: 36:15
- Label: Slash
- Producer: Mark Van Hecke

Violent Femmes chronology
Violent Femmes (1983)	Hallowed Ground (1984)

Singles from Violent Femmes
- 1. "Gone Daddy Gone" Released: 1983

Violent Femmes is the debut album by American folk punk band Violent Femmes. Mostly recorded in July 1982, the album was released by Slash Records on vinyl and on cassette in April 1983, and on CD in 1987, with two extra tracks, "Ugly" and "Gimme the Car".

In 2002, Rhino Records remastered the album, filled out the disc's length with demos and added another disc of live tracks and a radio interview for a 20th anniversary special edition, with liner notes by Michael Azerrad.

Violent Femmes is the band's most successful album to date. The Recording Industry Association of America (RIAA) certified the album gold four years after its release and platinum four years after that, despite it never having appeared on the Billboard 200 albums chart. After achieving platinum certification on February 1, 1991, the album finally charted on the Billboard 200 for the first time on August 3, 1991, and peaked at number 171. Since Nielsen Music began electronically tracking sales in 1991, the album has sold 1.8 million copies. Blending RIAA certifications and Nielsen Music sales data, the record's American sales were estimated at three million as of 2016.

== Background ==
Most of the songs on Violent Femmes and its follow-up were written when songwriter Gordon Gano was an 18-year-old high-school student in Milwaukee, Wisconsin.

The album was recorded at Castle Recording Studios in Lake Geneva, Wisconsin in July 1982. It was self-funded before they had signed with their record label, Slash. Gano said, "It was a strange situation because we hadn't met anyone from Slash or been to Los Angeles when we signed with them. The good thing was because we recorded the album first, it was exactly the way we wanted. There was no executive influence."

== Cover ==
The cover model is Billie Jo Campbell, a three-year-old girl who was walking down a Los Angeles street when she and her mother were approached and offered $100 for the photograph that became the album cover. The photograph depicts Campbell peering into the window of a house in Laurel Canyon. Campbell recollects: "I remember looking into that building, and they kept telling me there were animals in there, and I was pissed off ... I didn't know why they were making me look in this building. I had no idea there were photographers there. I was ... pissed off that I couldn't see the animals and I was all cranky by the end of it."

== Release and reception ==
Professional ratings
Review scores
Source	Rating
AllMusic	5/5 stars
Blender	4/5 stars
Pitchfork	9.1/10
Q	4/5 stars
Rolling Stone	4/5 stars
The Rolling Stone Album Guide	4/5 stars
The Sacramento Bee	4/4 stars
Spin Alternative Record Guide	10/10
Uncut	4/5 stars
The Village Voice	B+

At the time of its release, The Violent Femmes garnered airplay on college radio and sold modestly on LP and cassette, peaking in the lower rungs of Billboard’s Top 200 album chart. The album’s cult following and subsequent release on compact disc led to steady sales well into the 1990s, pushing it up into Billboard’s Hot 100 with sales topping seven million physical copies. In Australia, the album charted even higher, hitting #34 upon initial release and then climbing back up to #31 in 1991.

In a contemporary review for Rolling Stone, J. D. Considine wrote that Violent Femmes was precocious yet dynamic, with a good balance between Gano's direct lyrics and the full sound of the music. Robert Christgau of the Village Voice compared Gano to Jonathan Richman of the Modern Lovers. Gano himself grew tired of comparisons to Richman, as by his own account he was actually trying to sound like Steve Wynn of the Dream Syndicate.

In a retrospective write-up for AllMusic, Steve Huey called Violent Femmes "one of the most distinctive records of the early alternative movement and an enduring cult classic," noting that "the music also owes something to the Modern Lovers' minimalism, but powered by Brian Ritchie's busy acoustic bass riffing and the urgency and wild abandon of punk rock, the Femmes forged a sound all their own," while crediting Gano for keeping "the music engaging and compelling without overindulging in his seemingly willful naiveté."

Violent Femmes has been included in lists of the best albums of the 1980s by publications such as Pitchfork, who in a 2002 list ranked it 36th, and Slant Magazine, who in a 2012 list ranked it 21st. In 2014, PopMatters listed Violent Femmes as an essential alternative rock album of the 1980s. It also placed at number 974 in the 2000 edition of the book All Time Top 1000 Albums, and was included in the book 1001 Albums You Must Hear Before You Die.

== Track listing ==
All tracks are written by Gordon Gano, except where noted.

Side one
No.	Title	Length
1.	"Blister in the Sun"	2:25
2.	"Kiss Off"	2:56
3.	"Please Do Not Go"	4:15
4.	"Add It Up"	4:44
5.	"Confessions"	5:32

Side two
No.	Title	Writer(s)	Length
1.	"Prove My Love"		2:39
2.	"Promise"		2:49
3.	"To the Kill"		4:01
4.	"Gone Daddy Gone"	Gano, Willie Dixon	3:06
5.	"Good Feeling"		3:52

US CD bonus tracks
No.	Title	Length
11.	"Ugly"	2:21
12.	"Gimme the Car"	5:04

(Recorded at Music Works Studios, London, August 31–September 1, 1983)

20th Anniversary Edition bonus tracks
No.	Title	Length
11.	"Girl Trouble" (demo)	3:07
12.	"Breakin' Up" (demo)	5:17
13.	"Waiting for the Bus" (demo)	2:08
14.	"Blister in the Sun" (demo)	2:35
15.	"Kiss Off" (demo)	2:49
16.	"Please Do Not Go" (demo)	4:18
17.	"Add It Up" (demo)	4:35
18.	"Confessions" (demo)	5:20
19.	"Prove My Love" (demo)	2:50
20.	"Ugly" (UK single)	2:22
21.	"Gimme the Car" (UK single)	5:07

20th Anniversary Edition bonus live disc
No.	Title	Length
11.	"Girl Trouble" (demo)	3:07
12.	"Breakin' Up" (demo)	5:17
13.	"Waiting for the Bus" (demo)	2:08
14.	"Blister in the Sun" (demo)	2:35
15.	"Kiss Off" (demo)	2:49
16.	"Please Do Not Go" (demo)	4:18
17.	"Add It Up" (demo)	4:35
18.	"Confessions" (demo)	5:20
19.	"Prove My Love" (demo)	2:50
20.	"Michael Feldman Interview from WHA-FM"	4:09
21.	"Kiss Off" (live on WHA-FM)	3:31

40th Anniversary Deluxe Edition (disc 1)
No.	Title	Length
11.	"Ugly" (UK single)	2:22
12.	"Gimme the Car" (UK single)	5:07
13.	"Girl Trouble" (demo)	3:07
14.	"Breakin' Up" (demo)	5:17
15.	"Waiting for the Bus" (demo)	2:08
16.	"Blister in the Sun" (demo)	2:35
17.	"Kiss Off" (demo)	2:49
18.	"Please Do Not Go" (demo)	4:18
19.	"Add It Up" (demo)	4:35
20.	"Confessions" (demo)	5:20
21.	"Prove My Love" (demo)	2:50

40th Anniversary Deluxe Edition (disc 2)
No.	Title	Writer(s)	Length
1.	"Special" (live at Beneath-It-All Café, Milwaukee, WI - 9/12/1981)		4:27
2.	"Country Death Song" (live at Beneath-It-All Café, Milwaukee, WI - 9/12/1981)		5:25
3.	"To the Kill" (live at Beneath-It-All Café, Milwaukee, WI - 9/12/1981)		4:19
4.	"Never Tell" (live at Beneath-It-All Café, Milwaukee, WI - 9/12/1981)		7:17
5.	"Break Song" (live at The Jazz Gallery, Milwaukee, WI - 12/8/1981)		0:41
6.	"Her Television" (live at The Jazz Gallery, Milwaukee, WI - 12/8/1981)		2:28
7.	"How Do You Say Goodbye" (live at The Jazz Gallery, Milwaukee, WI - 12/8/1981)		2:43
8.	"Theme and Variations" (live at The Jazz Gallery, Milwaukee, WI - 12/8/1981)		0:54
9.	"Prove My Love" (live at Folk City, New York, NY - 1/26/1983)		3:19
10.	"Gone Daddy Gone" (live at Folk City, New York, NY - 1/26/1983)	Gano, Dixon	3:32
11.	"Promise" (live at Folk City, New York, NY - 1/26/1983)		3:09
12.	"In Style" (live at Folk City, New York, NY - 1/26/1983)		3:43
13.	"Add It Up" (live at Folk City, New York, NY - 1/26/1983)		6:15

40th Anniversary Deluxe Edition digital bonus tracks
No.	Title	Writer(s)	Length
11.	"Ugly" (UK single)		2:22
12.	"Gimme the Car" (UK single)		5:07
13.	"Girl Trouble" (demo)		3:07
14.	"Breakin' Up" (demo)		5:17
15.	"Waiting for the Bus" (demo)		2:08
16.	"Blister in the Sun" (demo)		2:35
17.	"Kiss Off" (demo)		2:49
18.	"Please Do Not Go" (demo)		4:18
19.	"Add It Up" (demo)		4:35
20.	"Confessions" (demo)		5:20
21.	"Prove My Love" (demo)		2:50
22.	"Special" (live at Beneath-It-All Café, Milwaukee, WI - 9/12/1981)		4:27
23.	"Country Death Song" (live at Beneath-It-All Café, Milwaukee, WI - 9/12/1981)		5:25
24.	"To the Kill" (live at Beneath-It-All Café, Milwaukee, WI - 9/12/1981)		4:19
25.	"Never Tell" (live at Beneath-It-All Café, Milwaukee, WI - 9/12/1981)		7:17
26.	"Break Song" (live at The Jazz Gallery, Milwaukee, WI - 12/8/1981)		0:41
27.	"Her Television" (live at The Jazz Gallery, Milwaukee, WI - 12/8/1981)		2:28
28.	"How Do You Say Goodbye" (live at The Jazz Gallery, Milwaukee, WI - 12/8/1981)		2:43
29.	"Theme and Variations" (live at The Jazz Gallery, Milwaukee, WI - 12/8/1981)		0:54
30.	"Prove My Love" (live at Folk City, New York, NY - 1/26/1983)		3:19
31.	"Gone Daddy Gone" (live at Folk City, New York, NY - 1/26/1983)	Gano, Dixon	3:32
32.	"Promise" (live at Folk City, New York, NY - 1/26/1983)		3:09
33.	"In Style" (live at Folk City, New York, NY - 1/26/1983)		3:43
34.	"Add It Up" (live at Folk City, New York, NY - 1/26/1983)		6:15

== Personnel ==
Violent Femmes

- Victor DeLorenzo – snare drum, tranceaphone, drum set, scotch marching bass drum, backing vocals
- Gordon Gano – acoustic and electric guitars, violin, lead vocals
- Brian Ritchie – acoustic and electric bass guitars, xylophone, backing vocals

Additional personnel

- Mark Van Hecke – production, piano on "Good Feeling"

== Charts ==
Chart performance for Violent Femmes
Chart (1983–1986)	Peak position
Australian Albums (Kent Music Report)	34
US Billboard 200	171
Chart (1991)	Peak position
Australian Albums (ARIA)	31
Chart (2024)	Peak position
Greek Albums (IFPI)	55

== Certifications ==
Certifications for Violent Femmes
Region	Certification	Certified units/sales
Australia (ARIA)	2× Platinum	140,000^{^}
United States (RIAA)	Platinum	1,000,000^{^}
^{^} Shipments figures based on certification alone.
