= Diana Rowan =

Irish harpist, pianist and composer

Diana Rowan (born 26 January 1971 in Dublin, Ireland) is an Irish harpist and pianist. She specializes in lever harp, concertizing, lecturing, teaching and recording worldwide. She lives in the San Francisco Bay Area, California, USA.

Rowan was born to Belfast-bred parents while they were students at Trinity College, Dublin. Upon graduation, her father John Rowan joined the Irish Foreign Service as a diplomat.

== Musical mentors and education ==
Her mother Phyllis (McCrory) Rowan is a pianist and childhood music educator. Diana was noticed by Robert Redaelli, the head of the music conservatory she attended in Brussels, Belgium, and he would occasionally teach her himself in addition to her regular teacher Greek-born Mina Papamanolis. Later, Tchaikovsky prizewinner Roy Bogas became her piano teacher at Holy Names University in Oakland, California, where Diana gained a Master of Music degree in Piano Performance. Israeli Harp Competition winner Alice Giles of Australia became her harp mentor, and Balkan singing maestra Bon (Brown) Singer of Kitka became her Eastern European/Sephardic music mentor, as well as the instigator of the concert where Rowan discovered the potential of the harp. This led to Rowan gaining a PhD in Music Theory from the National Academy of Music, Bulgaria, focused on world harp techniques.

== Influences ==
Rowan's work is influenced primarily by Bach, Debussy, Poulenc, Bartók, and Celtic, Balkan, Middle Eastern and Hindustani styles. Her compositions are inspired by Irish poet Nuala Ní Dhomhnaill, Greek poet Odysseas Elytis, and English/US poet W.H. Auden, among others, as well as Celtic and Greek myths.

== Healing music ==
Rowan is involved in healing music as the founder of Sage Harpists.

== Teaching ==
Diana founded Bright Knowledge Academy, and online music school that teaches the Bright Knowledge System, a method for developing creativity and manifesting musical goals. Bright Knowledge Academy also presents Virtual Harp Summit every 6 months, which is an online festival-conference featuring multiple presenters from around the world.

== Solo discography ==
- Panta Rhei (2004)
- The Bright Knowledge (2008)
- As Above, so Below (expected 2018)

== Quotes about Rowan ==
- "This is a disc that finally takes the harp to a serious space, something rarely done. Thus, if you're serious about harp, one way or another, you're going to end up listening to Diana Rowan." - Mark S. Tucker
- "Diana's shining soul and sparkling personality are conducted through her fingers through her harp to the very heart of any listener. She could take Happy Birthday and interpret in such a way that you'd laugh, cry and change your life." - Bon (Brown) Singer, Balkan choral music director
