= Gone Daddy Gone =

Single by Violent Femmes

from the album Violent Femmes
- B-side: "Good Feeling"
- Released: 1983
- Recorded: July 1982
- Studio: Castle Recording Studios, Lake Geneva, Wisconsin
- Length: 3:03
- Label: Slash
- Songwriters: Gordon Gano, Willie Dixon
- Producer: Mark Van Hecke

Violent Femmes singles chronology
"Gone Daddy Gone" (1983)	"Ugly" (1983)

Music video
- "Gone Daddy Gone" on YouTube

"Gone Daddy Gone" is a song written by Gordon Gano and originally recorded by his group Violent Femmes as the first single for their first album, Violent Femmes.

== Lyrics ==
The lyrics use a complete verse from Willie Dixon's 1954 song "I Just Want to Make Love to You", originally recorded by Muddy Waters. For this reason, the song is occasionally referred to as "Gone Daddy Gone/I Just Want to Make Love to You", as on Permanent Record: The Very Best of Violent Femmes. It has two xylophone solos.

== Music video ==
The band produced a black and white music video in 1983, produced by Steve Martin and Douglass Brian Martin of Martin Industries.

== Reception ==
Eric Weisbard in Spin Alternative Record Guide said the "febrile vibes and springy guitar on 'Gone Daddy Gone' — make the record an early document in the coalescing of a new wave of generational angst in the 1980s". Dan Hintz of the Krishmatics said, "The song is a real gem due to the sociopath vocal delivery, the skittering and shuffling drums, the brilliant melody line on the xylophone, the buzzing guitar and bass interplay, the love-is-false lyrics." Shaughnessy Bishop-Stall wrote about the song in his book Ghosted (2010).

== Track listing ==
US 7" single
No.	Title	Length
1.	"Gone Daddy Gone"	3:03
2.	"Good Feeling"	3:49

UK 7" single
No.	Title	Length
1.	"Gone Daddy Gone"	3:03
2.	"Add It Up"	4:35

== Personnel ==
- Gordon Gano – guitar, lead vocals
- Brian Ritchie – xylophone, electric bass guitar
- Victor DeLorenzo – snare drum and tranceaphone, Scotch marching bass drum, backing vocals

== Gnarls Barkley version ==
A cover version of the song was the third single released in the United States by the American soul duo Gnarls Barkley, and is taken from their first album St. Elsewhere (2006). In the United Kingdom, it was released as a double A-side with "Who Cares?" and reached No. 60 on the UK Singles Chart. An animated music video was also made. The cover version was used in a 2008 commercial for the film Igor, in the TV series Entourage and Chuck, in the 2006 game Tony Hawk's Project 8 and in the 2007 game Forza Motorsport 2.
