= Max Dunn =

Australian writer

Maxell Walter Dumont Dunn (1895 – 4 September 1963) was an Australian editor, publisher, poet, and literary translator.

Born in Dublin, Ireland, Dunn's early life remains obscure, though he claimed to have been educated at the University of Edinburgh, and in France and the United States, before moving to Australia in 1924, and settling in Melbourne. His claims to have been in the Royal Flying Corps in World War I also seem unsubstantiated. Dunn worked as a psychotherapist, poet, publisher, and journalist with The Argus, Smith's Weekly and other Melbourne newspapers and magazines. Dunn also worked as a literary translator from the Chinese. Dunn became a Buddhist priest in 1955. He died of cancer in the Melbourne suburb of South Yarra.
