= Add It Up =

Song by Violent Femmes

Song by Violent Femmes

from the album Violent Femmes
- Released: April 1983
- Genre: Alternative rock, folk punk, post-punk
- Length: 4:44
- Label: Slash Records
- Songwriter: Gordon Gano

"Add It Up" is a song by American rock band Violent Femmes, released on their 1983 debut album Violent Femmes.

It contains the lyrics:

Why can't I get just one screw
Believe me I'd know what to do
But something won't let me make love to you
Why can't I get just one fuck
Why can't I get just one fuck
I guess it's got something to do with luck
But I waited my whole life for just one

Band member Gordon Gano commented:

I was in my bedroom—that's where I wrote it—feeling frustrated. I had nowhere to go and nothing to do. It just happened to feel good lyrically ... and it still does.

The song title was used as the name for the compilation album by the group, Add It Up (1981–1993).

Some radio stations substitute a guitar note for the swear word for airplay.

== Used in other media ==
- The song is featured in the soundtrack of the 2004 skateboarding video game Tony Hawk's Underground 2.
- Canadian singer Shawn Mendes performed a cover of the song during the season 3 premiere of The 100. A music video for the cover was released by The CW. Violent Femmes bassist Brian Ritchie responded positively to the rendition through the band's official Facebook page, saying "It’s a testament to the universality expressed in [the song] that it can be resurrected with a different result even after 35 years and still sound current."
