= Blister in the Sun =

1983 single by Violent Femmes

Promotional single by Violent Femmes

from the album Violent Femmes and Grosse Pointe Blank OST
- Released: 1997
- Recorded: July 1982
- Studio: Castle Recording Studios, Lake Geneva, Wisconsin
- Genre: Blues; skiffle
- Length: 2:27
- Label: Slash
- Songwriter: Gordon Gano
- Producer: Mark Van Hecke

Violent Femmes singles chronology
| "Tonight" (1995) | "Blister in the Sun" (1997) | "All I Want" (2000) |

"Blister in the Sun" is a song by American rock band Violent Femmes, originally released on their 1983 self-titled debut album. It was later released as a promo single in 1997 after its inclusion in the film Grosse Pointe Blank. A live promo single was released in 1999 in promotion of the live album Viva Wisconsin.

== Background ==
"Blister in the Sun" was written by Violent Femmes vocalist Gordon Gano. The drum lick was written by Victor DeLorenzo; the song was his first performance with the band.

Gano originally wrote the song for a female vocalist.

== Lyrics ==
The lyrics to "Blister in the Sun" refer to drug use. After the song was released, a misinterpretation arose that the lyrics were about masturbation. In a 2013 interview with The Village Voice, Gano said:

I don't think there’s a whole lot to understand with the lyrics. In fact, it was maybe 10 or 15 years later, when somebody was asking me about that song and said something like, "Well, you know… You know what that song's about." I'm like, "No. What are you talking about?" "Well everybody knows. You wrote it." I'm like, "What?" And they told me the song was about masturbation. I had never thought of that.

== Track listing ==
1997 promo single
| No. | Title | Length |
|---|---|---|
| 1. | "Blister in the Sun" | 2:07 |
| 2. | "Blister 2000" | 2:57 |

1999 promo single
| No. | Title | Length |
|---|---|---|
| 1. | "Blister in the Sun" (Live) | 2:31 |

== Certifications ==
| Region | Certification | Certified units/sales |
|---|---|---|
| United Kingdom (BPI) | Silver | 200,000^{‡} |
^{‡} Sales+streaming figures based on certification alone.

== Other versions and use in media ==
The song was featured in the 17th episode of teen drama series My So-Called Life.

In 1997, the song was featured prominently in the film Grosse Pointe Blank. John Cusack had initially requested an updated version of the song, which led to the band recording a new, slower arrangement that featured saxophones, strings and other instruments. This version of the song was dubbed "Blister 2000". However, Cusack eventually decided he wanted to include the original version of the song as well. Because the original master tapes of the band's debut album had long been disposed of, they decided to record a new version of the original 1983 arrangement. Both these versions were released as part of a promotional CD single in 1997. Neither of these rerecorded versions appear in the actual film, although a new music video, directed by Evan Bernard, was created for the new recording of the 1983 arrangement. It features Gordon Gano as a deranged assassin trying to kill Socks the cat in puppet form, interspersed with clips from the film.

A cover by mxmtoon is played in the 2021 video game Life Is Strange: True Colors.

In February 2021, the song was covered by drag queen and singer Trixie Mattel for her extended play Full Coverage, Vol. 1.

== Legacy ==
In 2005, "Blister in the Sun" became the first English-language track to ever be allowed on RTÉ Raidió na Gaeltachta, the Republic of Ireland Irish-language radio station, after having been selected by listeners for the event.

In August 2007, Gordon Gano was the subject of a lawsuit brought by bassist Brian Ritchie, which stemmed partly from Gano's authorization of the use of "Blister in the Sun" in a Wendy's commercial. This disagreement caused the band to disband until their reunion in 2013.
