= Sigmund Snopek III =

American musician and composer (born 1950)

Sigmund Snopek III (born 1950) is an American musician and composer.

== Career ==
Snopek began his career in the late 1960s with a prog-rock band called Bloomsbury People. He has since created concept albums, pop songs, and classical compositions. Along the way, he performed and recorded with The Violent Femmes. In 2015, he was inducted into the Wisconsin Area Music Industry Hall of Fame.

Snopek composed a jazz symphony to celebrate the 150th anniversary of the founding of Waukesha, Wisconsin, which was performed at the University of Wisconsin–Waukesha on August 12, 1984. Snopek's works often have a local Milwaukee flavor to them, such as a song named for Robin Yount on his Baseball album. His classical works have been performed by many organizations in Milwaukee, including the Milwaukee Symphony Orchestra and Milwaukee Chamber Orchestra.

In the late 1970s Snopek and Byron Wieman III led a band that played in Wisconsin and was simply named "Snopek." They recorded two vinyl albums, "Thinking Out Loud" and "First Band On The Moon." Details of those albums listed below. A third rock album under the name "Sigmund Snopek III" titled "WisconsInsane" appeared on Dali Records in 1987, continuing his rock career.

== Discography ==
The Bloomsbury People

- Released: 1970
- Format: LP
- Label: MGM
- Writers: Jon Wyderka, Sigmund Snopek III
- Singles: "Birdsong", "Witch Helen"

Virginia Woolf

- Released: 1972
- Format: LP/CD
- Label: Water Street Records (1972), Music Is Intelligence (1994 - Germany), Gear Fab Records (2000), Belle Antique (2011 - Japan)
- Writers: Sigmund Snopek III

Trinity Seas Seize Sees

- Released: 1974
- Format: LP/CD
- Label: Akashic (1974), Musea (2002)
- Writers: Sigmund Snopek III
- Singles: "Return of the Spirit", "Waukesha Windows"

Nobody to Dream

- Released: 1975
- Format: LP
- Label: Couth Youth Records
- Writers: Sigmund Snopek III

Thinking Out Loud

- Released: 1979
- Format: LP, CD
- Label: Mountain Railroad Records (1979), One-Way Records
- Writers: Sigmund Snopek III, Byron Wiemann III

First Band on the Moon

- Released: 1980
- Format: LP, CD
- Label: Mountain Railroad Records (1980), Musea (2002)
- Writers: Sigmund Snopek III, Byron Wiemann III

Turn Around

- Released: 1980
- Format: Cassette
- Writers: Sigmund Snopek III

Roy Rogers Meets Albert Einstein

- Released: 1982
- Format: LP
- Label: Mountain Railroad Records
- Writers: Sigmund Snopek III

WisconsInsane

- Released: 1987
- Format: LP
- Label: Dali Records
- Writers: Sigmund Snopek III, Victor DeLorenzo

Sigmund Snopek's Beer

- Released: 1997
- Format: CD
- Label: Charm School Records
- Writers: Sigmund Snopek III, Andrea Terek

Miasma Fragments

- Released: 2001
- Format: CD
- Label: Spiritone Records
- Writers: Sigmund Snopek III

Christmas

- Released: 2001
- Format: CD
- Label: Not On Label
- Writers: Sigmund Snopek III

Jade

- Released: 2003
- Format: CDr
- Label: Not On Label
- Writers: Sigmund Snopek III
