= Violent Femmes =

American rock band

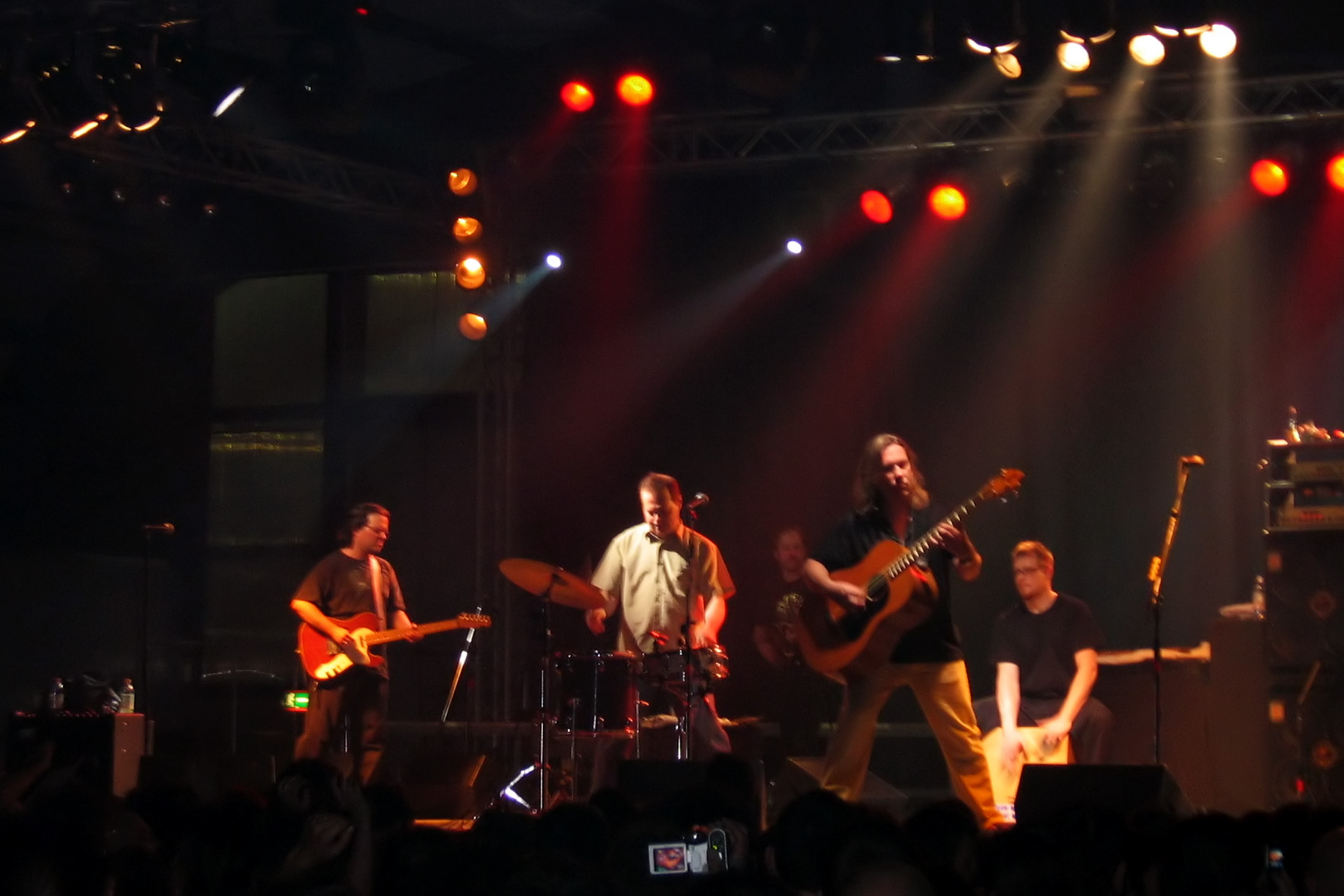
- Violent Femmes in 2006

Background information
- Origin: Milwaukee, Wisconsin, U.S.
- Genres: Folk punk; alternative rock
- Works: Discography
- Years active: 1981–2009; 2013–present
- Labels: Slash/Reprise; Rough Trade; Elektra; Mushroom; Interscope; Beyond; Add It Up Productions
- Members: Gordon Gano; Brian Ritchie; Blaise Garza; John Sparrow
- Past members: Victor DeLorenzo; Guy Hoffman; Brian Viglione
- Website: vfemmes.com

Violent Femmes are an American folk punk band from Milwaukee, Wisconsin, United States. The band consists of founding members Gordon Gano (guitar, lead vocals) and Brian Ritchie (bass, backing vocals), joined by multi-instrumentalist Blaise Garza (joined 2004), and drummer John Sparrow (joined 2005). Former members of the band include drummers Victor DeLorenzo (1980–1993, 2002–2013), Guy Hoffman (1993–2002), and Brian Viglione (2013–2016). Violent Femmes are considered to be an integral part of the then-underground folk punk and alternative rock scenes of the 1980s, and remain influential or inspirational to the subsequent movements, particularly on folk rock, indie rock, grunge, pop punk, emo, and the late 1980s and 1990s alternative rock scene.

Violent Femmes have released 10 studio albums and 19 singles during the course of their career. The band found critical acclaim with the release of their self-titled debut album in early 1983. Featuring many of their best-known songs, including "Blister in the Sun", "Kiss Off", "Add It Up", and "Gone Daddy Gone", Violent Femmes became the band's biggest-selling album and was eventually certified platinum by the RIAA. After releasing two more albums, Hallowed Ground (1984) and The Blind Leading the Naked (1986), the band's future was uncertain and they split up in 1987 when Gano and Ritchie went solo. They regrouped a year later, however, releasing their fourth album 3 (1989). The follow-up album, Why Do Birds Sing? (1991), contains the fan favorite and concert staple "American Music".

In 1993, founding member Victor DeLorenzo (percussion, snare drum) left Violent Femmes and was replaced by Guy Hoffman, who debuted on the band's sixth album New Times (1994). Two more albums – Rock!!!!! (1995) and Freak Magnet (2000) – were released with this lineup before DeLorenzo rejoined the band in 2002 for what was to be a farewell tour. Following the commercial failure of Freak Magnet, Violent Femmes did not release any more studio albums for almost two decades, although a number of compilation albums were released in the early 2000s, along with a few one-off songs. Some controversy over the licensing of the band's songs for commercial use led to an official break-up in 2009, though they re-formed in 2013 (shortly before DeLorenzo left Violent Femmes again), and have since released two more studio albums of new material: We Can Do Anything (2016) and Hotel Last Resort (2019).

== History ==
=== Early years and first album (1981–1983) ===
Violent Femmes were founded by bassist Brian Ritchie and percussionist Victor DeLorenzo in 1981, joined shortly thereafter by lead vocalist and guitarist Gordon Gano. According to Ritchie, he came up with the name of the group as a fake band name when one of his bandmates questioned his assertion that his brother was also in a band. He and DeLorenzo liked the name, so they used it for the rhythm duo in which they played prior to Gano joining the group.

In its early days, the band frequently played coffee houses and street corners. They were discovered by James Honeyman-Scott (of the Pretenders) on August 23, 1981, when the band was busking on a street corner in front of the Oriental Theatre, the Milwaukee venue that The Pretenders would be playing later that night. Chrissie Hynde invited them to play a brief acoustic set after the opening act.

In 1983, the band released their self-titled debut album, Violent Femmes.

=== Later years and brief split (1984–1992) ===
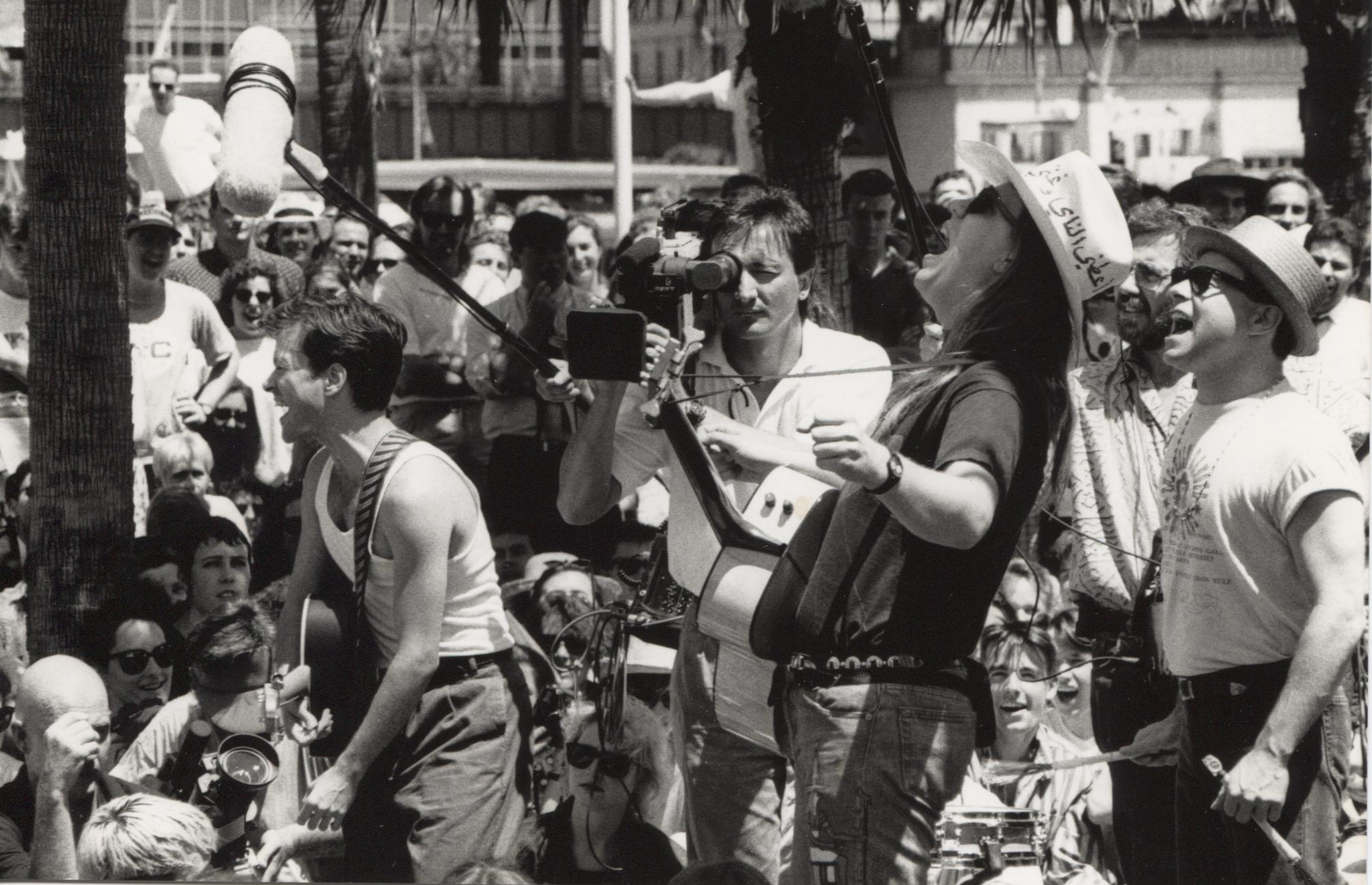
The band at the Sydney Opera House (1990).

After their debut album Violent Femmes, the band released Hallowed Ground, which moved the group toward a country music sound and introduced Christian themes. Mark Van Hecke produced the band's first two efforts, but their third album, The Blind Leading the Naked, saw a change in the studio. This time, another fellow Milwaukee native, Jerry Harrison of Talking Heads, did the producing. It was more mainstream and pop-oriented, resulting in a minor hit with "Children of the Revolution", originally by T. Rex.

In 1985, Van Hecke ended his collaboration with the group and became a composer and producer in the rapidly growing video game industry. He would return later to produce two more albums for the group. The Femmes briefly disbanded, with Gano releasing an album in 1987, the result of a gospel side project Mercy Seat. Ritchie also released several solo LPs. The group came back together in late 1988, releasing 3, a return to the band's earlier, stripped-down sound. Why Do Birds Sing? was released in 1991 after the band signed to Reprise and featured another minor hit, "American Music", which became a concert staple.

=== Post-DeLorenzo years (1993–1998) ===
In 1993, DeLorenzo departed the group to act and make solo records. Guy Hoffman, formerly of the Oil Tasters and BoDeans, was brought in to tour what was to become one of the Violent Femmes' biggest-selling records, the Add It Up (1981–1993) collection. Over the next nine years, the band, with Hoffman, recorded five full-length CDs and a handful of one-offs for motion picture soundtracks, such as "I Swear It (I Can Change)" from the South Park: Bigger, Longer & Uncut soundtrack, "Color Me Once" for the soundtrack to The Crow, and other compilation projects.

In 1997, the band appeared as themselves in the fifteenth episode of the TV show Sabrina, the Teenage Witch, "Hilda and Zelda: the Teenage Years". The first full studio album with Hoffman on drums, New Times (Elektra Records), was released in 1994, and the band scored another minor hit with the song "Breakin' Up". Rock!!!!! (Mushroom Records) was released in 1995 in Australia only, although it has since become available in the United States.

=== Later years and reunion with DeLorenzo (1999–2006) ===
Gordon Gano interviewed (2000).

In 1999, Viva Wisconsin, a live album, was released in the United States through Beyond Music, followed by Freak Magnet (2000). Something's Wrong (2001), an album of unreleased studio tracks, covers, demos, and acoustic live performances, was released as an MP3-only album through eMusic.

In 2001, the band recorded a cover of the SpongeBob SquarePants theme song for Nickelodeon as a promotion for the show moving to prime time. In 2003, it was featured in the Complete 1st Season DVD as a special feature.

In 2002, Rhino Records repackaged the band's 1983 debut album, along with demos and live tracks, to coincide with a 20th-anniversary reissue. DeLorenzo asked to rejoin for what was to be a farewell tour, thus reinstating the original lineup.

In 2005, the band released two collections of past work: a CD called Permanent Record: The Very Best of Violent Femmes on Slash/Rhino; and a DVD called Permanent Record – Live & Otherwise from Rhino, which showcases a concert performance from 1991, along with many of the group's videos. The CD was the first release that recognized all four musicians and their contributions on the same disc.

After touring in promotion of Freak Magnet, primary songwriter Gano decided that the band would no longer make new music, but would continue to play shows when booked. On New Year's Eve of 2005, and for one show in January 2006, all four Violent Femmes members played together.

=== Lawsuit and disbanding (2007–2009) ===
In 2007, Gano angered Ritchie by selling advertising rights for the classic "Blister in the Sun" to Wendy's.

Although nearly all of the band's songs, including "Blister in the Sun", credit Gano as the sole songwriter, Ritchie responded to the use of the song in the commercial by saying:

For the fans who rightfully are complaining about the Wendy's burger advertisement featuring "Blister in the Sun", Gordon Gano is the publisher of the song and Warners is the record company. When they agree to use it there's nothing the rest of the band can do about it, because we don't own the song or the recording. That's showbiz. Therefore when you see dubious or in this case disgusting uses of our music you can thank the greed, insensitivity, and poor taste of Gordon Gano, it is his karma that he lost his songwriting ability many years ago, probably due to his own lack of self-respect as his willingness to prostitute our songs demonstrates. Neither Gordon (vegetarian) nor me (gourmet) eat garbage like Wendy's burgers. I can't endorse them because I disagree with corporate food on culinary, political, health, economic, and environmental grounds. However, I see my life's work trivialized at the hands of my business partner over and over again, although I have raised my objections numerous times. As disgusted as you are I am more so.

In August 2007, Ritchie filed a lawsuit against Gano, seeking half ownership of Violent Femmes' music and access to royalty accounting. Many speculated this would lead to the band's breakup. On June 17, 2008, however, the band released a cover of "Crazy" by Gnarls Barkley, who had previously covered "Gone Daddy Gone".

In 2009, the band disbanded as a result of Ritchie's lawsuit against Gano.

=== Reunion (since 2013) ===
In April 2013, Violent Femmes reunited to perform at the Coachella Valley Music and Arts Festival. They performed next at the Bottlerock Napa Valley in May, then Milwaukee's Summerfest in June.

In March 2013, drummer Victor DeLorenzo said that he would be open to recording new material with the Violent Femmes, but on July 15, 2013, it was announced that Dresden Dolls drummer Brian Viglione would replace DeLorenzo as the band's drummer. In a statement, DeLorenzo said: "It's always hard to write a eulogy for a lost loved one. In this case, I sadly lament the loss of a dream and an ideal that was once Violent Femmes."

In September 2013, the band was on the bill for Riot Fest, which took place in Chicago.

As part of the 2013/2014 Falls Festival, the band played three shows in Australia performing at Marion Bay on December 30, Lorne on December 31, and Byron Bay on January 2.

On May 11, 2014, the band performed at the Shaky Knees music festival in Atlanta, Georgia.

Around the start of 2015, the band played several shows in Australia, including the Woodford Folk Festival, the Sydney Opera House, and MONA FOMA festival. In the midst of these performances, they recorded their first new material in 15 years on New Year's Eve 2014 in Hobart, Tasmania. These four songs were released on an exclusive four-song EP on clear 180-gram vinyl on April 18, 2015, for Record Store Day. The band then joined Barenaked Ladies and Colin Hay on a two-month tour in the summer of 2015.

In January 2016, Viglione announced via his Facebook page that he had "handed in his resignation" to the band, adding that he was "grateful to have had the experience".

Later that month, the band announced that its first full album in 16 years, We Can Do Anything, would be released on March 22, 2016. Viglione is credited as the drummer on the album.

At the end of 2015, after Viglione's exit, drummer John Sparrow, who, in August 2005, had begun playing cajón in the Femmes' backing band, the Horns of Dilemma, joined the band as its new drummer. On February 23, 2016, he appeared with the band on The Late Show with Stephen Colbert to promote We Can Do Anything.

On April 30, 2019, the band announced a new studio album, Hotel Last Resort, released on July 26, 2019.

In July 2019, the band returned to the East Side neighborhood of Milwaukee, in and around the street art destination Black Cat Alley, to film the music video for the single "I'm Nothing".

The Violent Femmes are featured on the song "Gotta Get to Peekskill" by Dropkick Murphys that appears on the band's album Okemah Rising (2023).

== Band members ==
Current

- Gordon Gano – lead vocals, guitars, violin, banjo (1980–1987, 1988–2009, 2013–present)
- Brian Ritchie – bass, backing vocals, guitars, shakuhachi, xylophone, keyboards (1980–1987, 1988–2009, 2013–present)
- John Sparrow – drums, percussion, backing vocals (2016–present); cajón (2005–2009, 2013–2016) (member of the "Horns of Dilemma" until 2016)

Former

- Victor DeLorenzo – drums, percussion, backing vocals (1980–1987, 1988–1993, 2002–2009, 2013)
- Guy Hoffman – drums, percussion, backing vocals (1993–2002)
- Brian Viglione – drums, percussion, backing vocals (2013–2016)

Horns of Dilemma

- Blaise Garza – saxophones, percussion, keyboards, backing vocals (2004–2009, 2013–present)
- Peter Balestrieri – saxophones, backing vocals (1983–1991)

=== Horns of Dilemma ===
In their shows, the Femmes employ a horn section called the Horns of Dilemma as their backing band. For many years, it consisted of Peter Balestrieri, Steve MacKay on saxophones, and Sigmund Snopek III on keyboards and other instruments.

The backing band was augmented by various musicians who the band invited to play with them, now using local acquaintances (famous or otherwise), friends, relatives, or other associates of the band, particularly their road crew. Instrumentation varies widely and includes saxophones, trumpets, trombones, sousaphone, flute, clarinet, antique hunting horn, kazoo, and percussion. The group doesn't back up the band in the way that a traditional horn section would; instead, they provide a free-form noise jam. When the band plays "Black Girls" or "Confessions", the only direction given to the players is to play freely and as wildly as possible during certain sections.

As of 2014, the leader of the Horns of Dilemma was Blaise Garza, who plays saxophone. Famous members have included John Zorn, Dick Parry, and the Dresden Dolls. Longtime band associates and employees who have played with the Horns include soundman Caleb Alexander and manager Darren Brown.

Before becoming the drummer for the main band, Femmes, John Sparrow played cajón for the backing band, Dilemma, starting in 2005. Various bassists stand in for Ritchie during "Gone Daddy Gone" when he plays xylophone. These musicians are all considered members of the Horns of Dilemma.

== Discography ==
=== Studio albums ===
- Violent Femmes (1983)
- Hallowed Ground (1984)
- The Blind Leading the Naked (1986)
- 3 (1989)
- Why Do Birds Sing? (1991)
- New Times (1994)
- Rock!!!!! (1995)
- Freak Magnet (2000)
- We Can Do Anything (2016)
- Hotel Last Resort (2019)
