= Victor DeLorenzo =

American drummer (born 1954)

Victor Joseph Britain DeLorenzo Jr
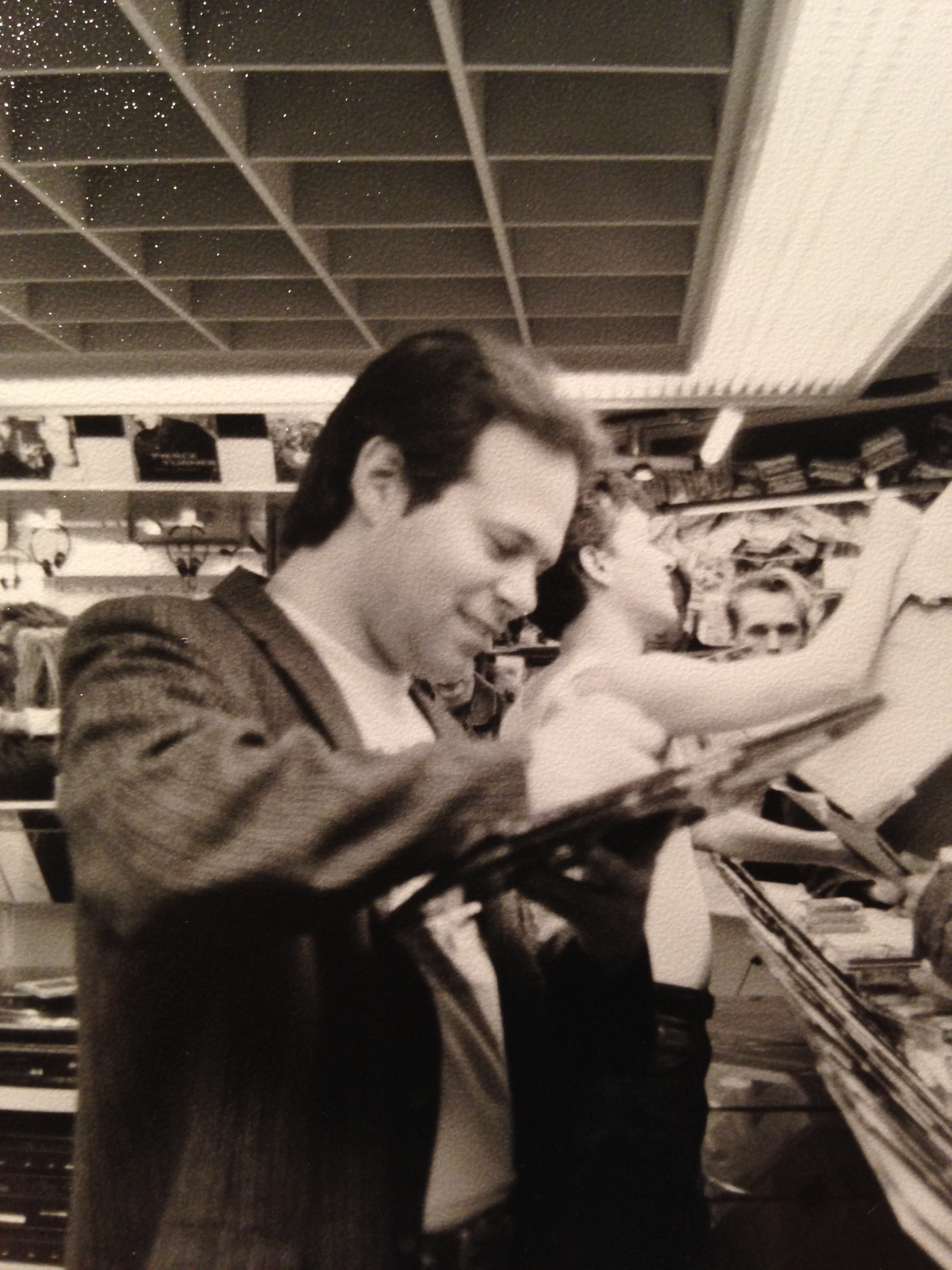

Background information
- Born: October 25, 1954 (age 71); Milwaukee, Wisconsin, U.S.
- Occupations: Musician; actor
- Instrument: Drums
- Years active: 1981–present
- Website: victordelorenzo.weebly.com nineteenthirteen.com

Victor DeLorenzo (born October 25, 1954) is an American musician, actor and filmmaker who was the founding drummer for the folk-punk band Violent Femmes.

== Biography ==
DeLorenzo was born in 1954, the son of Victor and Charlotte DeLorenzo, grew up in Racine, Wisconsin, and has lived in Milwaukee since. He has been a drummer since the age of 16, while attending St. Catherine's High School, and has been an actor since the age of five. While attending the University of Wisconsin-Milwaukee, he auditioned for and was accepted into Theatre X in 1976, and worked with them in various roles for more than 20 years.

As a drummer, DeLorenzo paired up with bassist Brian Ritchie in 1980, as a rhythm section they called "Violent Femmes". When singer, guitarist, and songwriter Gordon Gano joined them in 1981, the band kept the name. DeLorenzo's father loaned the band $10,000 to record their eponymous debut album in 1982. However, the band was forced to delay its release until 1983 after they signed to Slash Records.

DeLorenzo's signature sound is a result of his minimalist drum kit. He often uses nothing more than a snare drum, a tranceaphone and steel brushes. The tranceaphone consists of a metal bushel basket inverted over a tom. He favors this style of kit because the band often played on the streets in their early days.

DeLorenzo continued to act with Theatre X, and record and tour with the Femmes until 1993, when he left to devote more time to acting and to recording his own music. He toured as part of Moe Tucker's band in that year. In 1996 he opened a recording studio called "Joe's Real Recording". He has released three solo records since 1990. In addition to recording his own music, he has played with several side projects, including Ash Can School. In 2000, he teamed up with Ritchie to put together a Femmes compilation, and subsequently rejoined the band until it disbanded again in 2009. In March 2013, Gano, Ritchie and DeLorenzo reformed Violent Femmes once more and played a homecoming show at the Summerfest music festival in their native Milwaukee. Three months later, in July, the band announced a new line-up with Dresden Dolls member Brian Viglione as the band's drummer. DeLorenzo confirmed in a statement that he had left the Femmes permanently because of a failure of the band members to resolve their long-standing business disputes.

DeLorenzo performs percussion in the chamber rock duo Nineteen Thirteen with cellist Janet Schiff. Nineteen Thirteen's "Hurricane Noel" recording was featured in the 2011 TED Global Conference.

== Discography ==
- Peter Corey Sent Me (1990)
- Pancake Day (1996)
- The Blessed Faustina (1999)
- Infinite Prelude Ep (2011)
