= Gordon Gano =

American musician (born 1963)

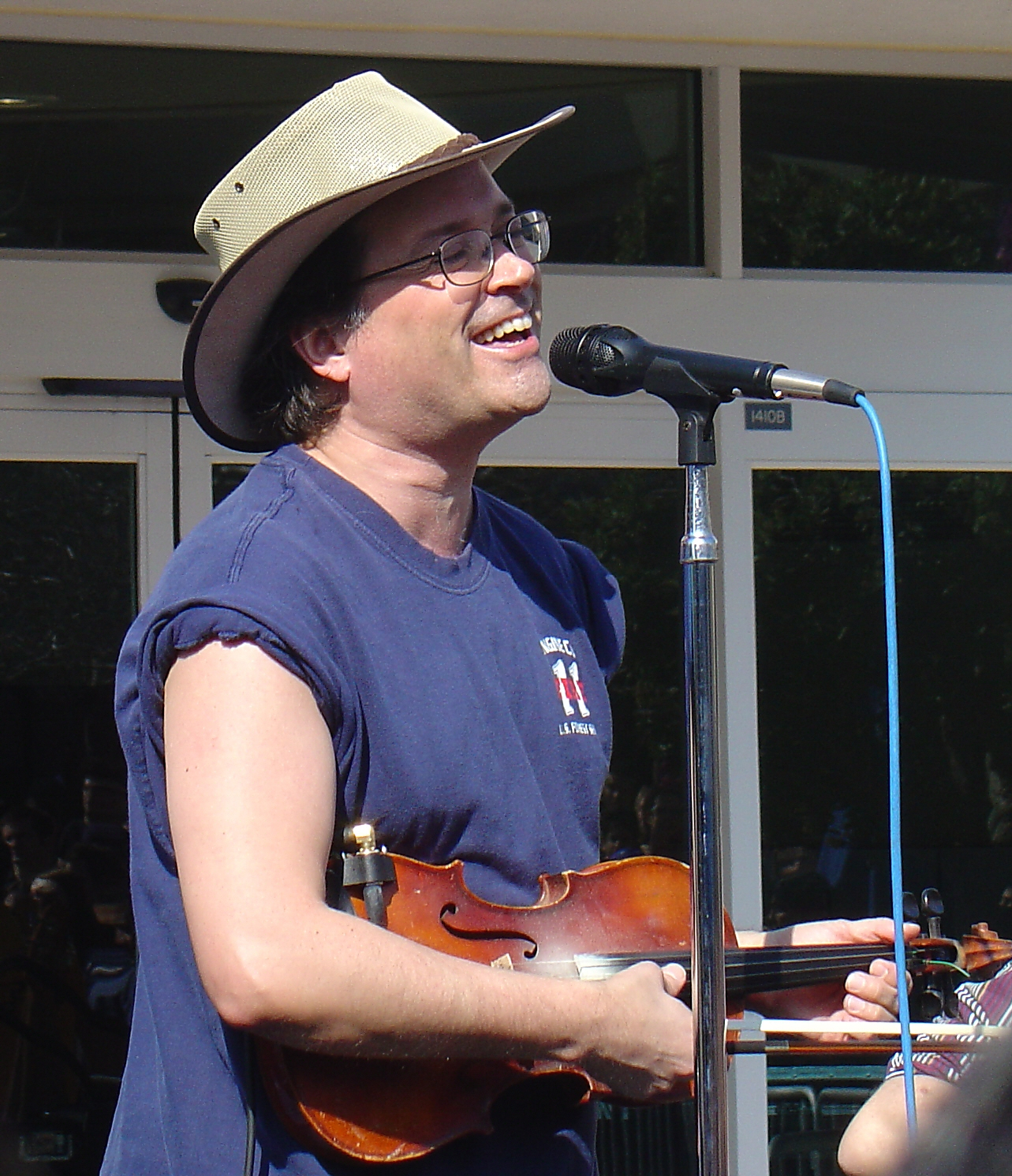
- Gano in concert with Violent Femmes, 2006

Background information
- Born: Gordon James Gano; June 7, 1963 (age 63); New York, New York, United States
- Origin: Milwaukee, Wisconsin, US
- Genres: Folk punk, post-punk
- Occupations: Musician, actor
- Instruments: Vocals, guitar, violin, banjo
- Years active: 1981–present
- Labels: Slash Records, Reprise, Elektra, Mushroom, Beyond, Yep Roc
- Member of: Violent Femmes

Gordon James Gano (born June 7, 1963) is an American musician who is the singer, guitarist and songwriter of American folk punk band Violent Femmes.

== Early life ==
Gano was born in New York City to actor parents Norman and Faye Gano, and grew up in Connecticut. The Ganos moved to Wisconsin in 1973, when Norman opened an American Baptist church in Oak Creek, Wisconsin, a suburb of Milwaukee. Norman, an accomplished actor, also formed a community theater group in Oak Creek, and Gordon appeared in many of its productions, notably "Sing Out, Sweet Land" in 1976. His father played guitar, and exposed his son to a wide array of musical genres, including country and western, show tunes, and gospel. The liner notes to the Violent Femmes's compilation album Permanent Record describe Gano as "a devout Baptist" and he has described his upbringing as “liberal Baptist” as his family was very open to the arts.

In 1979 the Ganos moved to nearby Hales Corners, where his father took over an existing American Baptist congregation. At this time Gordon began attending Milwaukee public school—Rufus King High School, from which he graduated in 1981. After graduating from high school, he worked briefly as an encyclopedia salesman.

Older siblings from his parents' previous marriages living in the New York area exposed young Gano to such influences as The Velvet Underground, Lou Reed, Brian Eno, Patti Smith, Jonathan Richman, and The B-52's. His garage band days began with covers of Bob Dylan and The Beatles and moved through the Grateful Dead songs to Lou Reed and Velvet Underground songs by 1979. He began writing his own songs in the mid 1970s, influenced by the vocal stylings of Lou Reed, the story-telling of Hank Williams, Sr. and the poetics of Patti Smith. Given his acting background, Gano wrote many of his songs for characters, whom he would portray while performing the associated song.

== Career ==
=== Violent Femmes ===
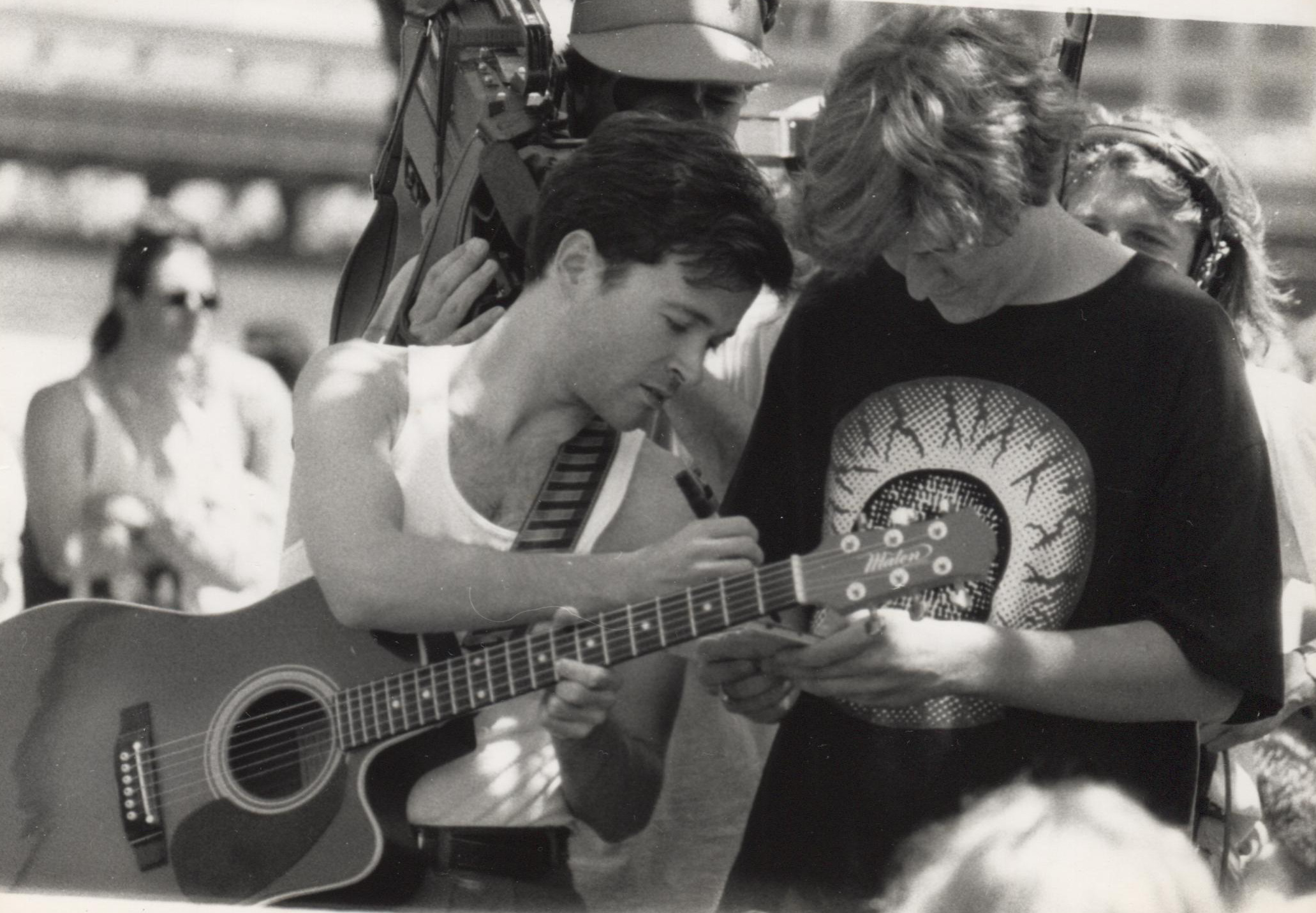
1990

Gano joined Violent Femmes in Milwaukee in 1981 with bassist Brian Ritchie and drummer Victor DeLorenzo. They soon developed an enthusiastic following thanks to songs such as "Blister in the Sun," "Kiss Off" and "Add It Up" (all included on their self-titled debut album). The band has experimented with a variety of sounds over the course of its career, such as country and western (Hallowed Ground) and gospel (The Blind Leading the Naked). Gano plays guitar, sings and writes most of the band's songs.

=== Other projects ===
During a Violent Femmes hiatus in the late 1980s, Gano formed a gospel-punk group called The Mercy Seat with vocalist Zena Von Heppinstall, bassist Patrice Moran, and drummer Fernando Menendez. They toured internationally for two years and released a self-titled album in 1987 on Warner Music Group's Slash Records. The album was re-released digitally in 2009 on Wounded Bird Records.

Gano released his first solo album in 2002, titled Hitting the Ground. He shared vocal duties with Manuel Cruz, lead singer of the Portuguese rock band Ornatos Violeta in the song "Capitão Romance," with Gano singing in Portuguese. Gano also played violin on Ben Vaughn's 1990 album Dressed in Black.

Gano contributed to the 2004 multi-artist collaboration The Late Great Daniel Johnston: Discovered Covered (alongside artists including Beck, Eels, TV on the Radio and Death Cab for Cutie), on which he provides a rendition of Daniel Johnston's "Impossible Love".

Gano wrote, recorded and performed with ex-members of The Bogmen, Billy and Brendan Ryan, under the name Gordon Gano & The Ryans. Their only album, Under the Sun, was released in September 2009 on Yep Roc Records.

== Acting ==
- Gano played Mr. Zank, the first of many substitute mathematics teachers, in an episode of The Adventures of Pete & Pete, entitled "X=Why?"
- Gano appears as a fictional version of himself, under a love spell, in the 1997 Sabrina, the Teenage Witch episode "Hilda and Zelda: the Teenage Years".
- Gano voiced a newborn baby singer in the 1998 animated film The Rugrats Movie.
