= Brian Ritchie =

American musician (born 1960)

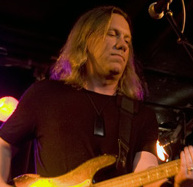
- Ritchie performing in 2008

Background information
- Born: November 21, 1960 (age 65); Milwaukee, Wisconsin, U.S.
- Genres: Rock, punk rock, folk music
- Occupations: Musician, songwriter
- Instruments: Bass guitar, shakuhachi
- Labels: Thylacine, Unhip, Slash, Warners, Reprise, Electra, Rough Trade, London

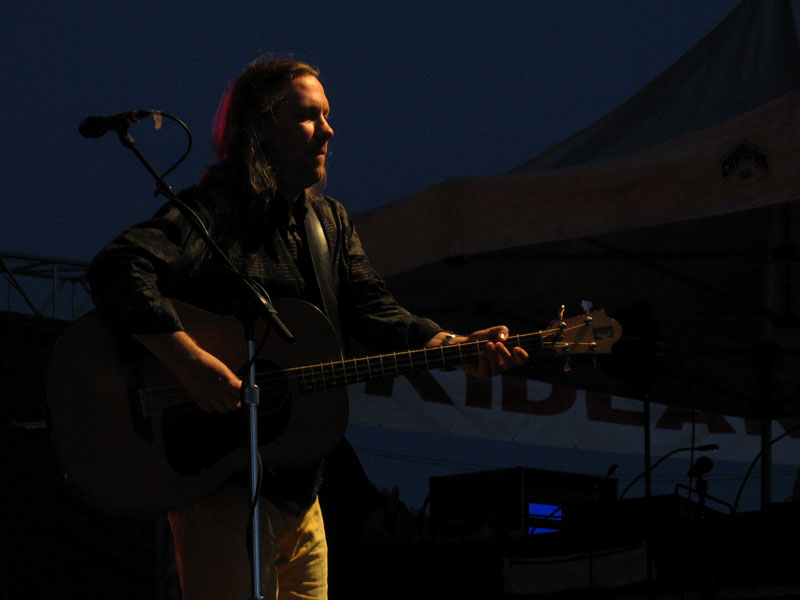
At Day on the Meadow on July 2nd, 2006 in San Jose, California

Brian Taigan Ritchie (born November 21, 1960) is an American-Australian musician, best known as the bassist for the alternative rock band Violent Femmes. Ritchie was born and raised in the United States and is currently a dual citizen of the U.S. and Australia, with his full-time residence in Australia.

In 2007 the Violent Femmes broke up acrimoniously after an argument between Ritchie and singer Gordon Gano. The band eventually re-formed and still tours today. It has since released several albums, including Hotel Last Resort in 2019.

Ritchie was curator of MONA FOMA festival at Museum of Old and New Art (MONA) in Tasmania from 2007 until it was discontinued in 2024.

In addition to his bass playing, Ritchie is proficient at the shakuhachi, a Japanese bamboo flute. He acquired a Jun Shihan (shakuhachi teaching license) in March 2003 from James Nyoraku Schlefer, and his professional name is "Tairaku" ("big music" in Japanese).

Ritchie has released three solo albums: in 1987, The Blend, in 1989, Sonic Temple & Court of Babylon and I See A Noise in 1990.

In 2007 Ritchie produced and toured with the Italian punk/folk band The Zen Circus, which subsequently changed its name to The Zen Circus and Brian Ritchie. The first international album of the band, Villa Inferno, was released in 2008 for the Italian record label Unhip Records.

In 2008, Ritchie and his wife, Varuni Kulasekera, moved to Hobart, Tasmania, Australia, where he has guested in a band called The Green Mist. Ritchie does most of his work in DV (David Vartanian) Studios.

On Australia Day 2012, Ritchie and his wife were naturalised as Australian citizens.

In 2009 he curated the first Mona Foma (MoFo) festival in Hobart, Tasmania. Since 2009 he has curated Mona Foma every year until 2024. At the 2012 MoFo, he organised an impromptu performance of the entire Violent Femmes first album by a 'super band' consisting of musicians playing at MoFo: the Dresden Dolls (Amanda Palmer, vocals, and Brian Viglione, drums), two musicians touring with PJ Harvey's band (Mick Harvey, guitar, and John Parish) and with Brian Ritchie himself on bass guitar and vibraphone.

In 2010 he toured as bassist with the Australian surf instrumental band called The Break, composed of Midnight Oil members Rob Hirst, Jim Moginie and Martin Rotsey. Their debut album Church of the Open Sky was released on April 16, 2010, on the independent label Bombora, distributed by MGM.

In 2011 his home in Tasmania, designed by architect Stuart Tanner, was featured on the TV series Sandcastles.

== Discography ==
- 1987 – The Blend (LP)
- 1989 – Sonic Temple & Court of Babylon (LP)
- 1989 – "Sun Ra – Man from Outer Space" (single)
- 1990 – I See a Noise (LP)
- 2004 – Shakuhachi Club NYC (LP)
- 2006 – Ryoanji (LP)
- 2007 – Taimu (LP)
- 2008 – Villa Inferno (LP with The Zen Circus)
- 2010 – Church of the Open Sky (with The Break)
- 2011 – Tea Life (with Silas Be Ritchie)
- 2012 – Tea Life 2 (with Silas Be Ritchie)
- 2013 – Space Farm (with The Break)
- 2013 – Tea Life 3 / Teenage Strangler 12" vinyl split (with Silas Be Ritchie)
