= Invisible Oranges =

American online music magazine

- Invisible Oranges logo

- Screenshot of Invisible Oranges' homepage
- Website type: Online magazine, music blog
- Available in: English
- Founded: September 2006; 20 years ago
- Headquarters: Brooklyn, New York, United States
- Country of origin: Germany
- Area served: Worldwide
- Owner: Enrique Abeyta
- Founder: Cosmo Lee
- Editors: Jon Rosenthal (editor-in-chief); Ted Nubel (editor)
- General manager: David Levine
- Industry: Heavy metal music
- Parent: BrooklynVegan (2013–2015); Townsquare Media (2015–2021); Project M Group (2021–present)
- Website: invisibleoranges.com
- Commercial: Yes
- Registration: No
- Launched: 6 October 2006; 19 years ago
- Current status: Active

Invisible Oranges is an American online music magazine dedicated to heavy metal news, band interviews and album reviews. It was founded by Cosmo Lee in September 2006 shortly after emigrating from San Francisco, California, United States to Berlin, Germany.

Invisible Oranges was acquired by American news company BrooklynVegan in January 2013, shifting its headquarters to Brooklyn, New York. In July 2015, BrooklynVegan and its subsidiaries became affiliates of American mass media conglomerate Townsquare Media. In January 2021, BrooklynVegan and Invisible Oranges were bought out by American digital media brand and e-commerce company Project M Group.

== History ==
=== Background (2006–2012) ===
Cosmo Lee started Invisible Oranges in September 2006 as a repository for his articles published by other magazines, such as PopMatters, Decibel, Stylus Magazine, and Metal Injection. Lee had recently moved from San Francisco, California to Berlin, Germany and published all of the articles in English. The website's first article was a scathing review of Voodoocult's debut Jesus Killing Machine, published on October 6, 2006. The site's name is derived from a common grasping hand gesture heavy metal singers make while performing ("holding an invisible orange").

On September 24, 2011, after five years of running the blog, Lee stepped down as editor-in-chief of Invisible Oranges, but retained ownership of the domain. The announcement was made six months earlier, on March 21, 2011, at which time Lee invited new writers to apply as editors and contributors. On August 26, 2011, Lee posted a second and final recruitment offer for editors, text editors, art directors, gatekeepers, calendar managers and writers. It was at this time that Vanessa Salvia joined as text editor, Haku Chamberlin-Bee joined as a designer and others joined the team in positions offered by Lee. Lee has since gone on to become associate director of direct response at the Children's Hospital Los Angeles.

Michael Nelson replaced Lee as editor-in-chief in September 2011 and remained in that position for the next nine months. Aaron Lariviere replaced Nelson as editor-in-chief in May 2012 but only lasted a brief eight months. Nelson and Lariviere were both contributing writers at Stereogum during their time at Invisible Oranges.

=== Acquisition by BrooklynVegan (2012–2015) ===
In December 2012, Lariviere announced his departure from Invisible Oranges, leading Lee to consider shutting down the website. Instead, BrooklynVegan writer Fred Pessaro offered to take the editor-in-chief position at Invisible Oranges. On January 4, 2013, Invisible Oranges officially joined the BrooklynVegan family as its fourth blog, behind BrooklynVegan, BV Chicago and BV Austin. Invisible Oranges' domain name was immediately transferred from Lee to BrooklynVegan's owner and founder David Levine.

Pessaro left Invisible Oranges after only nine months as editor-in-chief, in September 2013. He has since gone on to write for Noisey and Revolver. Doug Moore (vocalist in death metal band Pyrrhon) replaced Pessaro in September 2013 as editor-in-chief. Moore restructured the executive department, promoting Salvia to assistant editor, Wyatt Marshall to deputy editor and adding Kelly Kettering as director of promotions. Moore, however, only remained editor-in-chief for eight months, and like many of his former editors-in-chief, has gone on to write for Stereogum.

Ian Chainey replaced Moore as editor-in-chief in April 2014 for another short eight months. Joseph Schafer replaced Chainey as editor-in-chief in November 2014 and honored that position for two years and eight months; the longest time an editor-in-chief remained in that position since Lee. Wyatt Marshall left the deputy editor position in August 2014 but the role was not taken over by anyone else; Marshall also went on to write for Stereogum.

=== Acquisition by Townsquare Media (2015–2021) ===
In July 2015, BrooklynVegan and its three subsidiaries (Invisible Oranges, BV Chicago and BV Austin) became affiliates of American mass media conglomerate Townsquare Media, under its division Townsquare Music. At the time, Townsquare Music also owned such webzines as Consequence of Sound, Hype Machine, Ultimate Classic Rock, Loudwire, Gorilla vs. Bear and Noisecreep.

Salvia and Kettering both left Invisible Oranges in February 2017, at the same time as Ian Cory and Jon Rosenthal became executives. Cory acted as co-editor-in-chief, simultaneously with Schafer, until the latter's departure in July 2017; while Rosenthal was promoted to associate editor. Schafer went on to write for Decibel, Noisey, Bandcamp's Bandcamp Daily column, as well as co-host The Human Instrumentality podcast with Cory.

Andrew Rothmund became copy editor in July 2017; he was later promoted to editor-in-chief in January 2019 when Cory departed after one year and eleven months in the position. Rothmund has since become the third longest-running editor-in-chief of Invisible Oranges, behind Lee and Schafer, holding the position for two years and three months, until his departure in March 2021. Rosenthal, who had been promoted to senior editor in February 2020, became editor-in-chief in March 2021, and writer Ted Nubel was promoted to editor.

=== Acquisition by Project M Group (2021) ===
In January 2021, BrooklynVegan and Invisible Oranges were bought out by American digital media brand and e-commerce company Project M Group (which had previously bought out other magazines like Revolver, The Hard Times, Metal Edge, Inked and Goldmine). Project M Group founder Enrique Abeyta became the owner of Invisible Oranges but BrooklynVegan's founder David Levine stayed on as general manager. As part of the new partnership, BrooklynVegan and Invisible Oranges launched a new webstore selling vinyl records, band shirts and apparel, as well as toys and collectibles. The stores are identical across BrooklynVegan, Invisible Oranges, Revolver, The Hard Times, Metal Edge, Inked and Goldmine, with content controlled and curated by Project M Group.
