= Peculate (band) =

American avant-garde and progressive metal band

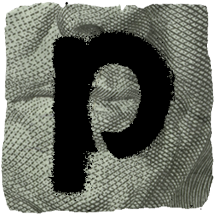

Background information
- Origin: United States
- Genres: Avant-garde metal, progressive metal, progressive rock, experimental, avant-garde, mathcore, djent, contemporary classical, jazz fusion, 12-tone serialism
- Years active: 2012–present
- Label: Independent
- Members: Ben Norton
- Website: Peculate.co

Peculate is an American avant-garde metal and progressive metal band, formed in 2012. Peculate "combines metal, djent, jazz, contemporary classical, avant-garde, electronic, and experimental music together to create progressive music with punk sensibilities." Much of Peculate's music is composed using the 12-tone technique. Metal blog Invisible Oranges describes the hallmarks of the band's sound as the "utilization of twelve-tone technique, the Zappa jazz fusion tangents, and the Devin Townsend-esque attention to production details."

Peculate is a project of composer and musician Ben Norton. Norton releases all of Peculate's material for free on the band's Bandcamp website.

== "This Sick Beat™" ==
Peculate generated controversy for a song it released on 31 January 2015 titled "This Sick Beat™." Norton says he wrote the song in protest of Taylor Swift's application to trademark phrases such as "This Sick Beat." The lyrics of the song consist almost exclusively of the phrase "this sick beat."

In the description on the video he uploaded of the song, Norton wrote "Trademarks of common idioms such as this are a direct attack on one of the most fundamental and inalienable rights of all: our freedom of speech. If you give the bourgeoisie an inch, they will take a mile... and everything else you have in the process. They have already privatized land, water, and words. After language, they will next try to privatize air. But, although the rich can try, they will never truly own the words we use and the language we speak."

The song was featured in Billboard, TIME, NME, Yahoo! Music, The Independent, and more.

Ben Norton published an official statement about the song on his website, detailing what exactly his intentions were with the song and how he believe the media misrepresented it.
