= Sxip Shirey =

American composer, performer, and story-teller

- Shirey with some of his tools

Background information
- Born: Gene Shirey; Athens, Ohio
- Genres: Electroacoustic, dark cabaret, etc.
- Occupations: Composer, performer, story-teller, musical instrument maker
- Label: Nonesuch Records
- Website: Official website

Gene "Sxip" Shirey (pronounced "skip") is an American electric-acoustic composer, performer, and story-teller. Currently based in New York City, he is known for working with found objects, traditional and rare modified instruments, as well as computers and other electronic instruments. Shirey has released three solo albums, including Sonic New York in 2010. Shirey is a member of The Daredevil Opera Company and is a founding member of the band Luminescent Orchestrii, as well as the band Gentlemen & Assassins. He is the host and producer of Sxip's Hour of Charm, a variety show of cabaret acts.

== Early life ==
Shirey grew up in Athens, Ohio. He graduated from Ohio University, and having studied physics and folk guitar, he moved to New York in the late-1980s. He currently resides in Brooklyn.

== Career ==
=== Bands ===
Shirey started experimenting with found sound composition and extended instrument techniques when asked to compose music for Ohio University's modern dance department. This eventually took him to New York City and he has been performing in venues ranging from underground clubs in Brooklyn to a TED, to Europe and to the Sydney Opera House.

A founding member of the band Luminescent Orchestrii in 2002, Shirey has released three albums with The Luminescent Orchestrii and one EP on Nonesuch Records as a collaboration between Luminescent Orchestrii and the Carolina Chocolate Drops. Shirey is also a member of The Daredevil Opera Company.

=== Solo albums and scores ===
Shirey has released three solo albums, with the first in 2006.

Statuesque , a 2009 short film by Neil Gaiman with a score by Shirey, Lily Percy of NPR wrote "The work stars Bill Nighy and is silent save for Shirey's haunting score — marked by an assortment of moody piano melodies, bells and chimes — which sets the tone for a dramatic take on a Mannequin-esque love story." It was featured in an 11 part series for Sky TV in the United Kingdom.

His 2010 solo album Sonic New York, Huffington Post wrote that "the collection of 17 pieces range from chanted poetry to raw blues to ghostly choirs to folk songs to a postmodern dance track and more." NPR reviewed the song "In Awe Of The City Skyline" in August 2010, describing it as "wistful," explaining that it "captures a singer's unique, complicated romance with New York City." The review also praised the duet between Shirey and Aimee Curl. He has had two songs featured as NPR's Song of the Day.

One of his live performances at the time, which often feature Shirey recruiting audience members to assist with instruments, Huffington Post wrote "every noise wrung out of a piece of cheap plastic or kazoo or run through his complicated amplification, stood on its own and had something authentic to say about sound and its resonance with the human nervous system. It was experimental, but it was confident and real - definitely not ironic."

=== Performances ===
Previous performance highlights include featured presenter at TED, support act for Dresden Dolls US tour, Ashley Capp's Big Ears Festival, Edinburgh Fringe, Adelaide Fringe Festival in Australia, Floyd Fest, Joe's Pub, The Knitting Factory and CBGB's in New York City.

He scored five silent films such as "A Trip to the Moon" by Georges Méliès in collaboration with The Museum of the Moving Image in Queens, New York.

Shirey has played exploding circus organ for the Daredevil Opera Company at the Sydney Opera House and the Kennedy Center, industrial flutes for acrobats at The New Victory Theater on Broadway, tamponophone with The Bindlestiff Family Cirkus at Bonnaroo, hillbilly music for gypsies in Transylvania.

In a band called Gentlemen & Assassins with another member of Dresden Dolls, Brian Viglione and Elyas Khan of Nervous Cabaret. They performed a show at Theater Dortmund with Sonic Youth and Dresden Dolls producer Martin Bisi

He is the host and producer of Sxip's Hour of Charm, a variety show of cabaret acts. Hour of Charm regularly occurs in New York City, usually at Joe's Pub, but has been taken on the road to the American Repertory Theatre, the Rothbury Music Festival and other venues. hirey also hosted and curated the multi-part Charm Sessions featuring live international music from NYC for Radio Scotland. Shirey has toured Ireland and Wales as a duo, "Sxip and Rhi" with Rhiannon Giddens of the Carolina Chocolate Drops.

=== Teaching ===
Shirey was invited to be a guest lecturer at the Norwegian Institute of Art in February 2012 and September 2013. The English National Opera ran his workshop for young composers (and composing music for a short film) in March 2012. He has also run his workshop at Trinity College, Oxford England and for the animation department at Harvard.

== Style and equipment ==
"His music sounds like stories. He works in the places where noise becomes music and does things that make you realize there are no boundaries between noise and music—or not like you imagine."
— Neil Gaiman in The Wall Street Journal

Shirey work utilizes found objects, traditional instruments, computer and modified instruments such as Industrial Flutes, Bullhorn Harmonicas, Regurgitated Music Box, Triple Extended Pennywhistles, Miniature Handbells, and other curious objects.

Neil Gaiman and Amanda Palmer made a musical instrument, called the "Sxipenspiel" for Shirey's birthday. It is made of a candlestick, pipe and bicycle bells. A sample of Neil and Sxip playing it features at the beginning of Shirey's former Gentlemen & Assassins bandmate Elyas Khan's single, "Bells".

== Discography ==
=== With The Luminescent Orchestrii ===
- 2004: Luminescent Orchestrii
- 2007: Too Hot to Sleep
- 2009: Neptune's Daughter
- 2011: Carolina Chocolate Drops/Luminescent Orchestrii EP

=== With Gentlemen & Assassins ===
- 2012: Mother Says We're Innocent

=== Solo albums ===
Albums by Sxip Shirey, with hidden track listings
Year	Album title	Release details
2006	Sombule: 1. "All Babies Must Cry" - 4:40; 2. "Pandora" - 6:19; 3. "Philomena's Waltz" - 2:37; 4. "My Own Dirge Coda" - 0:35; 5. "The Train" - 3:56; 6. "Train Heard from Porch" - 3:45; 7. "Trains" - 2:53; 8. "The Organ Grinder" - 0:44; 9. "Black Rosie" - 4:20; 10. "Diamanda Sprinkle" - 2:30; 11. "Istanbul" - 2:11; 12. "My Own Dirge" - 4:52; 13. "Sombule" - 3:54; 14. "All Babies Must Cry Coda" - 1:55	Released: Nov 15, 2006; Label: Self-released; Format: digital
2010	Sonic New York: 1. "15 Punk Rockers Pounding A Piano Into Junk" - 0:35; 2. "Live In New York City" - 4:42; 3. "Grammercy Park" - 1:38; 4. "You Can Ring My Bell" - 4:20; 5. "Ghosts of the Gowanus Canal" - 4:23; 6. "Dreamland" - 3:38; 7. "The Bed Bugs Are Back!" - 1:11; 8. "Lizzie Miss Lizzie!" - 3:50; 9. "Asleep On the Subway" - 5:23 10; 10. "The Choir Is Underground" - 0:34; 11. "Mehenatta" - 3:49; 12. "Clothes of My Man" - 4:08; 13. "Bergen and Grand" - 2:19; 14. "A Young Man Walks In Brooklyn" - 4:02; 15. "Caterpillar Crawls Through Chinatown" - 4:37; 16. "Brooklyn Bridge Song" - 1:49; 17. "Sunday Dub" - 5:21	Released: May 2, 2010; Label: Self-released; Format: digital

=== Compositions ===
Selected compositions by Sxip Shirey
Yr	Title	Media Type	Shirey's role	Premier/release date
2007	The City	Documentary	Composer, actor	
2007	Marsupial Girl	Children's theater	Composer, music director	The Minneapolis Children's Theater
2008	Hotel Gramercy Park	Feature film by Douglas Keeve	Composer	
2009	Statuesque	Short film by Neil Gaiman	Composer	
2009	The Why	Film	Composer	
2009	GIMP	Dance by The GIMP Project	Composer	The Institute of Contemporary Art in Boston
2009	Shadowland (with Rachelle Garniez)	Performance and score	Composer, performer	MOMA's Tribute to Salvador Dalí.
20	Song for Lizzie	Score	Composer	Boston Pops at Symphony Hall
2011	A Trip to the Moon/etc.	Silent films (5) by Georges Méliès	Composer	Museum of the Moving Image
2011	Women of Troy/Lysistrata	Puppet theater by Theodora Skipitaras	Composer, performer	La Mama
2012	Bendito Machine IV	Short film	Composer	
2013	Limbo	Cabaret by Strut and Fret Prod.	Composer, performer	

== See also ==
- List of dark cabaret artists
- List of film score composers
- List of TED speakers
- United States Artists
