= Orchestra Invisibile =

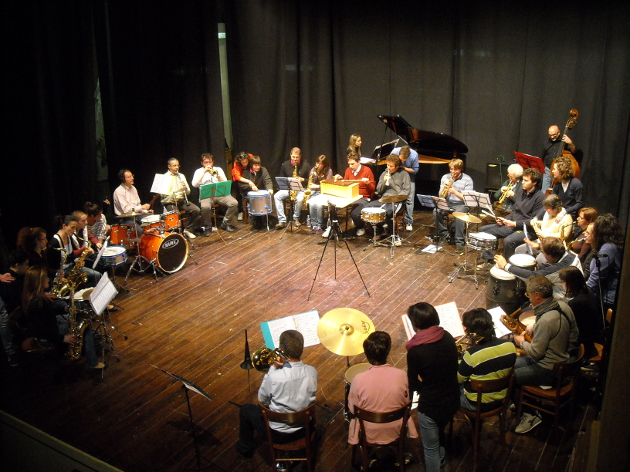
- Orchestra Invisibile live in Tortona

Background information
- Origin: Italy
- Genres: Jazz
- Years active: 2005–present
- Label: Etichette Invisibili
- Website: www.fondazionegenitoriautismo.it/cascinarossago.php/

The Orchestra Invisibile (lit. 'invisible orchestra') is an Italian band formed in 2005 in Cascina Rossago, Italy. It was the first Italian farm community designed to meet the needs and unfold possibilities of young adults with autism.

== History ==
The original group, formed by the first guests of Cascina Rossago and some students, trainee psychiatrists and professors of the University of Pavia, has grown to the actual number of 25 components, 12 of them affected by autism. The band counts 14 percussionists, 5 saxophonist, 3 trumpeters, 3 trombonists, one tuba player and a double-bass player, with several pianists. The term invisibile (invisible) refers to a feature of the group: the need to restrain the visibility of the musicians, to minimize distress for the more sensitive components, which could find the presence of an audience difficult to tolerate. Nevertheless, the Orchestra Invisibile appeared in public and performed live in theatres (Turin, Pavia, Tortona, and Viterbo). Yet, the communicative exchanges within the band are mainly non-verbal. The majority of the Orchestra Invisibile's repertoire is jazz mainstream. The experience has shown how this musical genre could be a good compromise between the consistency of the harmonic structures and the changes deriving from the improvisation and the spirit of freedom, characteristic features of jazz. This can be heard in their first album Orchestra Invisibile, live 2012, published by the independent label Etichette Invisibili. This would sound like an off-key and uncoordinated group in the beginning that gradually harmonizes and synchronizes reaching a pleasant ensemble towards the end. The only way to assist the rehearsals is to actively participate by playing. This aspect has promoted the collaboration with famous musicians as Ellade Bandini (drummers for Paolo Conte, Fabrizio De André, Francesco Guccini, Mina and many more), Jorge Alberto Guerrero, Claudio Perelli and Walter Casali.

Another critical feature of the band is the circular setting, both during rehearsals and live concerts, alternating melodic and rhythmic instruments, consistently with the sameness during the weekly rehearsals and the performance on stage. This disposition aims at improving the communication within the band, facilitating the visual contact. From the talent of Simona Concaro, and thanks to the contribution of the international musician Hanna Shybayeva, the album Playing with Autism 1.0 (Etichette Invisibili, INVI1301) and the book Playing with Autism 1.1 - Encountering Simona Concaro by Her Music (PUP 2014) have recently been published. Simona Concaro's executions have further been recorded in Playing with Autism 2.0 (Etichette Invisibili, INVI1401). In 2015 it was published the photographic book Orchestra Invisibile (Jaca Book 2015). Celebrating the ten years of activity, the Orchestra Invisibile performed two live concerts at the Teatro Municipale of Casale Monferrato (AL, Italy) and at the Auditorium of the Istituto Vittadini of Pavia (Italy). Furthermore, Edizioni Cardano of Pavia published the book Ritratti Invisibili as a gift for the percussionists of the band. In 2016 the Orchestra Invisibile took part at the Caffeina Festival in Viterbo, gaining the favour of both audience and critics. In 2017, in the context of the World Autism Awareness Day, the Orchestra played at the auditorium Tiziano Zalli of the Banca Popolare di Lodi, designed by Renzo Piano. The performance has been recorded and published in Orchestra Invisibile Live 2017 (Etichette Invisibili, INVI1701) along with a videoclip about the Orchestra Invisibile directed by Giorgia Soi with the contribution of Rossana De Michele. The Orchestra Invisibile also closed the second edition of the Festival Gli stati della Mente, in Vicenza (2018) and opened the Resilience Symposium 2019 at the University of Bologna. In December 6, 2019 the Orchestra Invisibile, celebrating its 15th Cristmass, interpreted the Sinfonia degli Arrivi, welcoming during the performance the arrival of several new musicians. During the Covid19 pandemic, in relation to the known restrictions, the activity of the Orchestra Invisibile continued thanks to the commitment of Stefano Damiani, the facility's doctor, and that of the educators present. External activity resumed during 2022 with participation in the Happy Jazz Fest (September 15, Milan) and with the Christmas concert at the Auditorium San Rocco (December 4, Voghera). On March 27, 2023, the Orchestra Invisibile held a concert at the Milan Conservatory, as part of the "Music, Inclusion, Creativity" conference, while on December 3, it inaugurated the Lombardy Festival of Inclusion in the Auditorium Testori. On October 19, 2024, the Orchestra was applauded at the Auditorium Casa dell'Economia in Lecco .

== Active components ==
- Stefano Damiani, Mariacristina Migliardi, Claudio Perelli: sax
- Fulvio Piacenza: trumpet
- Laura Fusar-Poli, Silvio Malinverno, Matteo Rocchetti: trombone
- Simona Concaro, Pierluigi Politi: piano
- Walter Casali, Alice Mandrini: bass
- Annalisa Aquilano, Ellade Bandini, Giovanni Barale, Marcos Beretta, Federico Campi, Dario Caporaso, Federico Carini, Erminia Casciaro, Claudia Castiglioni, Simona Concaro, Elisa Guarrera, Alice Mandrini, Cristiano Ravasini, Francesca Spagnuolo, Paolo Rovelli, Andrea Tomaselli, Tiziano Vaghi: percussions

== Discography ==
=== Albums ===
- 2012 – "Orchestra Invisibile live 2012" (Etichette Invisibili, INVI1201)
- 2013 – "Playing with Autism 1.0" (Etichette Invisibili, INVI1301)
- 2014 – "Playing with Autism 2.0" (Etichette Invisibili, INVI1401)
- 2017 – "Orchestra Invisibile live 2017" (Etichette Invisibili, INVI1701)
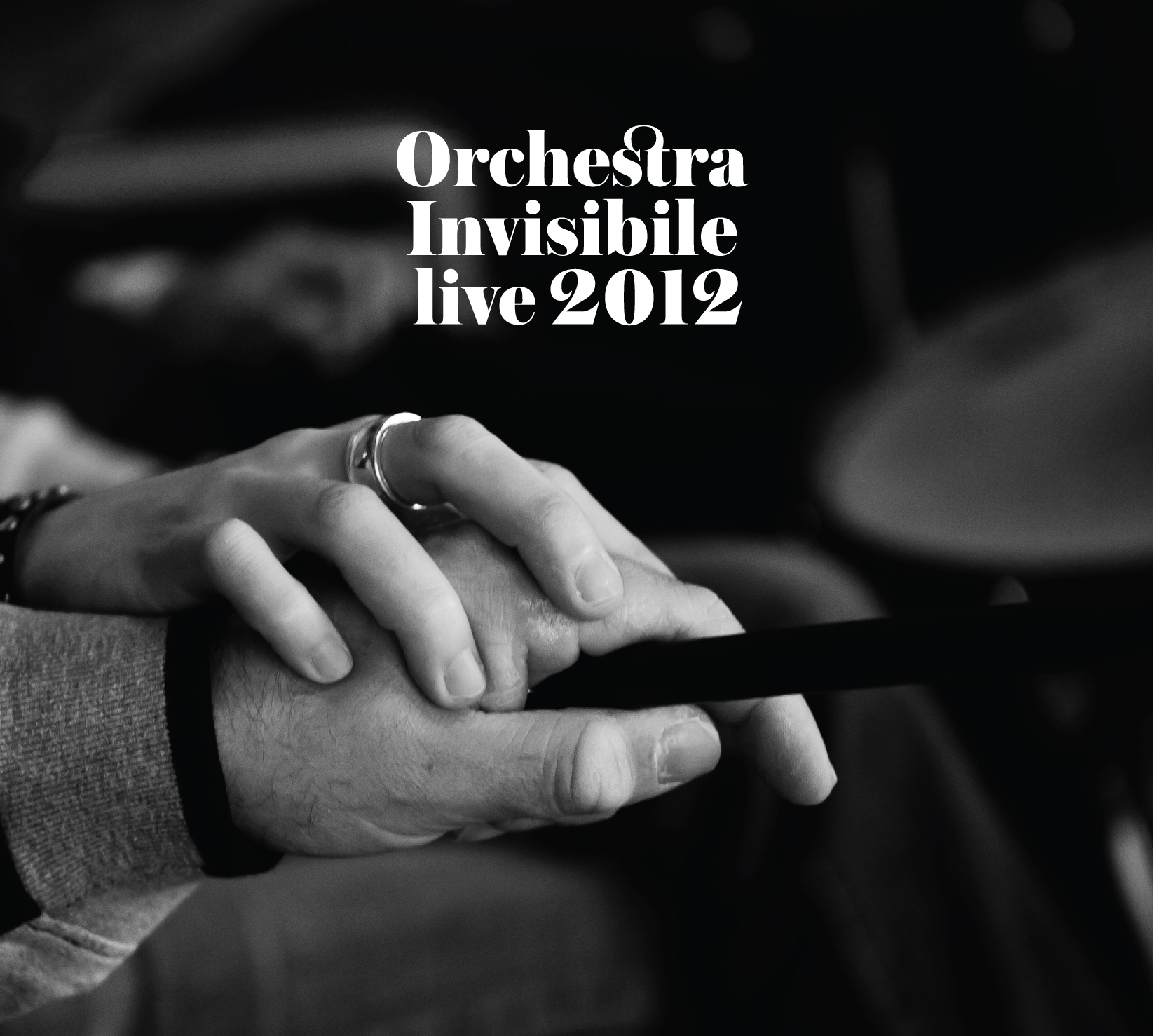
Orchestra Invisibile live 2012

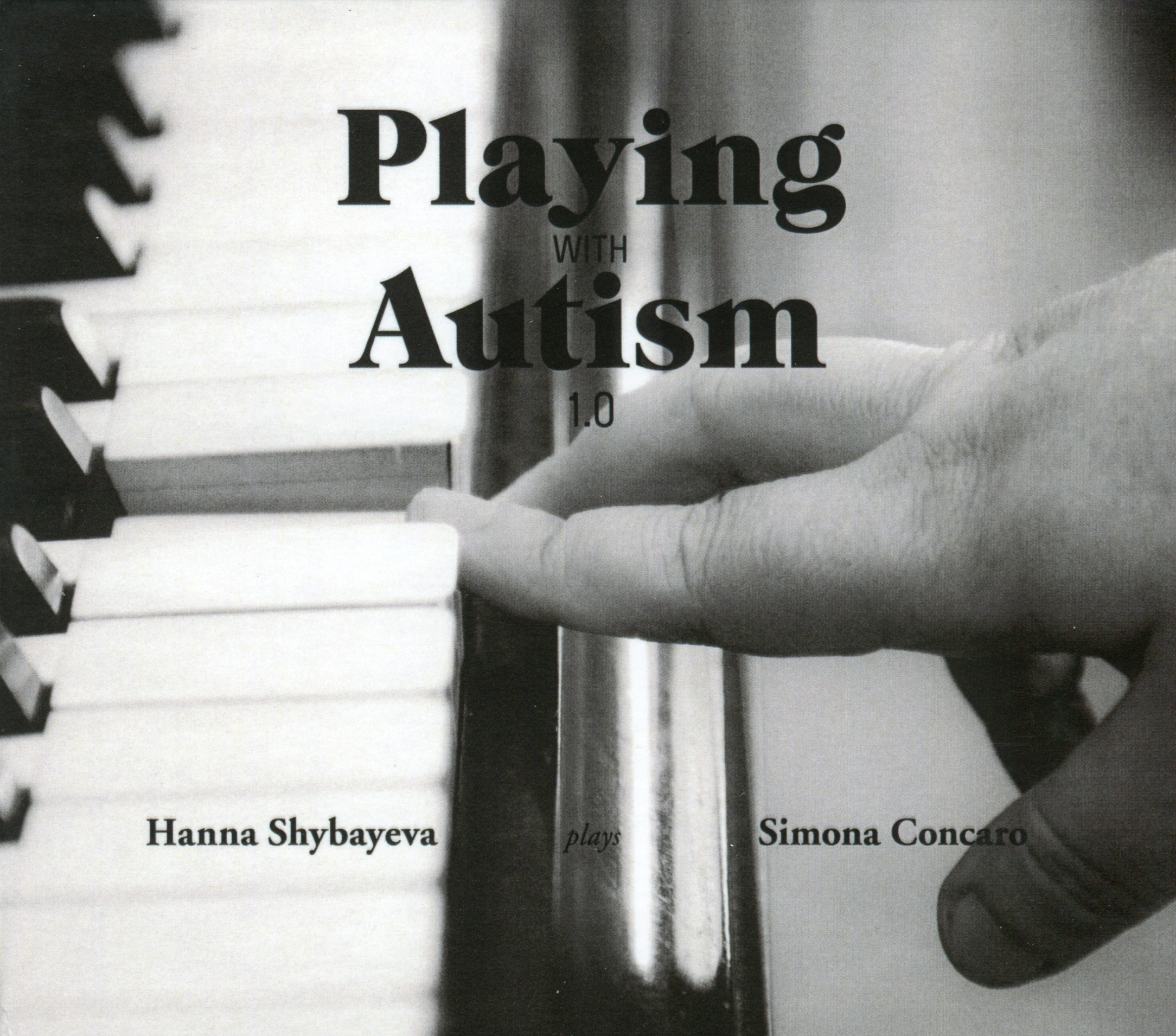
Playing with Autism 1.0

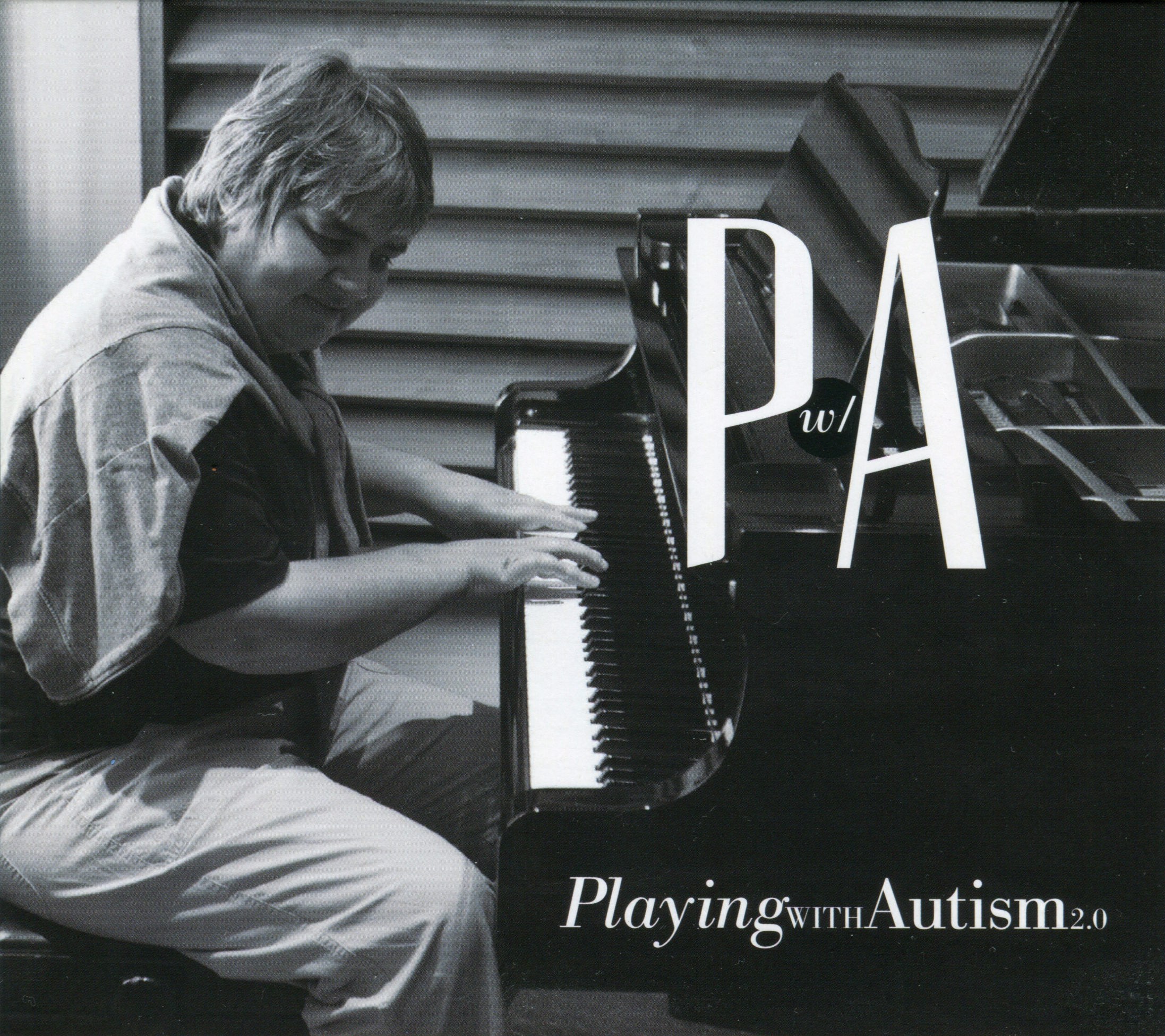
Playing with Autism 2.0

== Bibliography ==
- Politi, Pierluigi; Shybayeva, Hanna (2014). Playing with Autism 1.1 - Encountering Simona Concaro by Her Music. Pavia: Pavia University Press. ISBN 978-88-96764-96-1.
- Bandini, Ellade; Politi, Pierluigi; Sini, Carlo (2015). Orchestra Invisibile - Fotografie di Enrico Pozzato (in Italian). Milano: Jaca Book. ISBN 978-88-16-60501-5.
- Pozzato, Enrico; Politi, Pierluigi (2015). Ritratti Invisibili (in Italian). Pavia: Edizioni Cardano. ISBN 978-88-88936-53-6.
