= Dame (band) =

American rock band

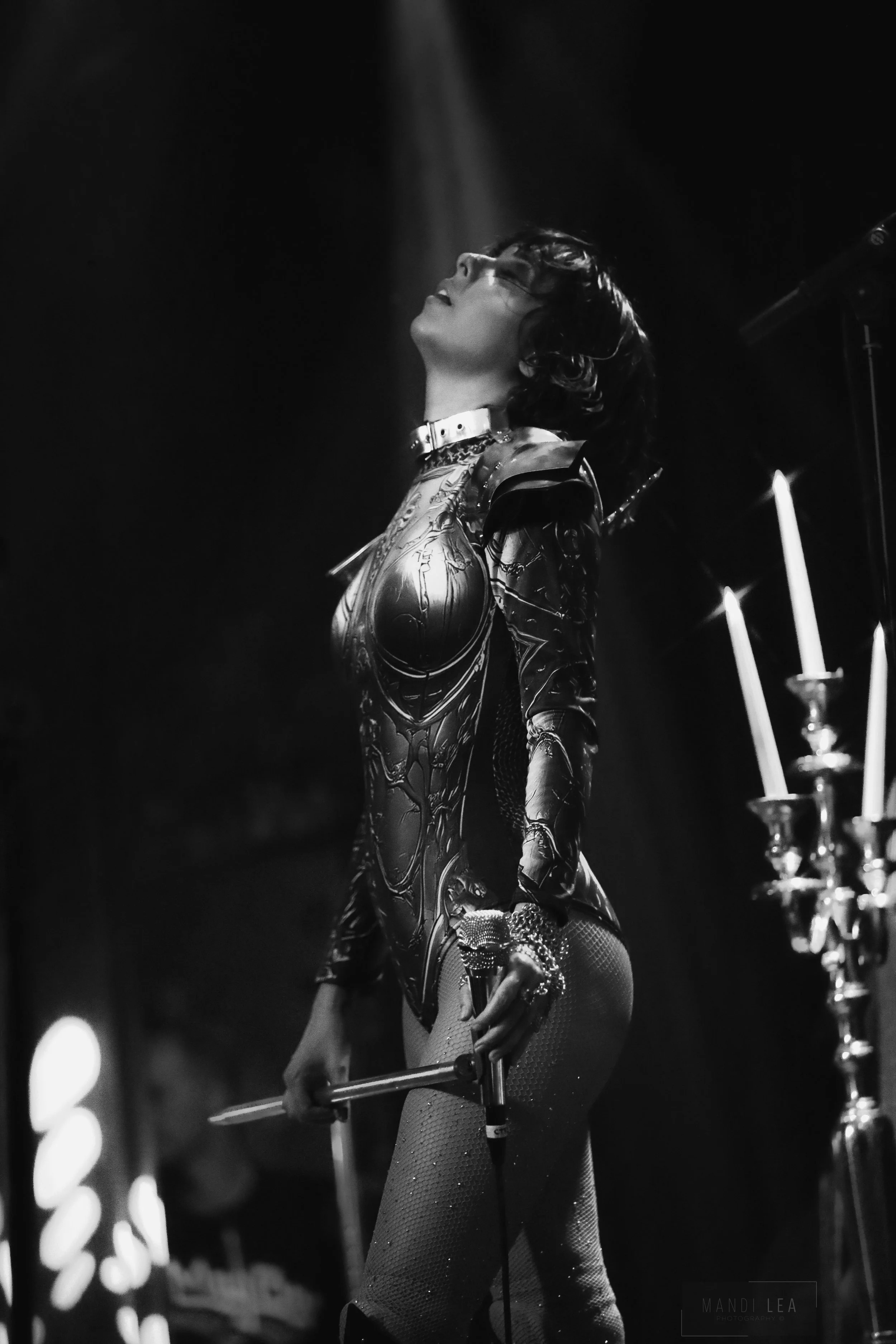
- Veronica Swift of DAME performing

Background information
- Origin: Los Angeles, California, U.S.
- Genres: Alternative rock
- Years active: 2024–present
- Members: Veronica Swift; Brian Viglione
- Website: www.dametheband.com

Dame (stylized in all caps) is an American rock band based in Los Angeles, California, formed in 2024. The band's fanbase is known as Souldiers.

== History ==
Dame was officially formed in the fall of 2024 through the collaboration of singer-songwriter Veronica Swift and drummer/producer Brian Viglione. Swift, a jazz and bebop singer, covered the song Sing by Viglione's band The Dresden Dolls, which led to Viglione discovering her in 2021. Viglione joined Swift's solo band's world tours in 2023 and 2024, following the release of her self-titled "transgenre" album, leading into the formation of Dame.

Dame's trailer video "Dreamsong" was released on July 15, 2025, and the band made their live debut at Jazz in Marciac in Marciac, France on July 26, 2025. They made their US debut at The Viper Room in Los Angeles on September 5, 2025 and their single, “Get Tough” premiered on the same day, produced by Sean Beavan.

They released their third song, “Get On The Grooveline” on October 10, 2025, also produced by Beavan.

== Musical style and influences ==
Dame's performances are intended to be immersive, combining music with symbolism and theatrical storytelling. blends theatrical live performances with diverse musical influences. They cite bands such as Queen, Led Zeppelin, Aerosmith and The Sensational Alex Harvey Band among their musical influences.

Their sound has been described as “reincarnating the swagger of '70s and '80s behemoths like Led Zeppelin and Van Halen”

Swift's knighting in France as Chevalier in the Order of Arts and Letters inspired the concept for Dame. She has cited historical figures associated with artistic and political resistance, including Joan of Arc and Josephine Baker, as influences on the project's thematic direction, which explores identity, resistance, and self-expression.

== Image and artistry ==
Dame's aesthetic incorporates elements such as medieval knights (inspired by Swift's 2024 knighting under the French Republic's Order of Arts and Letters), 1920s French and Weimar-era cabaret, and revolutionary soldiers.

In addition to props and costumes on stage, Dame's live shows also incorporate Swift on trumpet, tap dancing, and on recorder/autoharp.

== Band members ==
- Veronica Swift - vocals, keyboard
- Brian Viglione - drums, vocals, guitar
