= Phillip Boa and the Voodooclub =

Alternative rock band

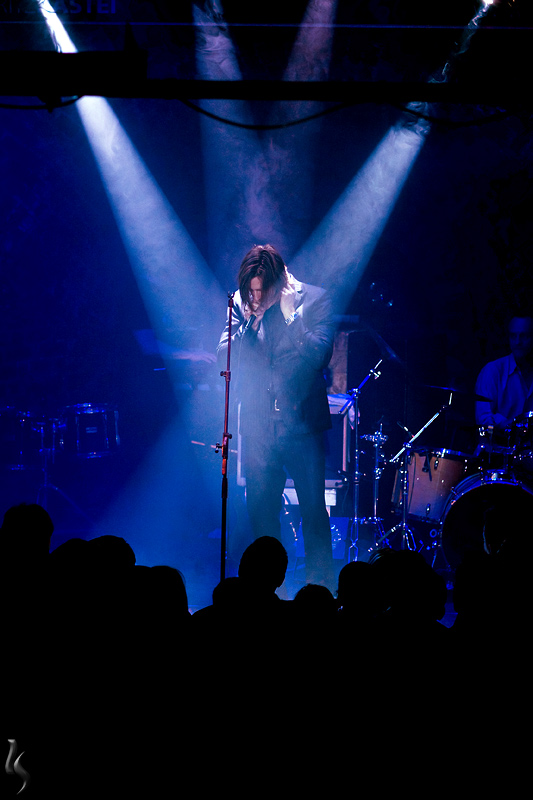
- Phillip Boa and the Voodooclub in Leipzig in 2007

Background information
- Origin: Germany
- Genres: Independent, Pop, Rock, Avantgarde
- Years active: 1985-present
- Labels: Constrictor, Universal
- Members: Phillip Boa - vocals, guitar; Moses Pellberg – drums; Toett – keyboards, percussion, programming & samples; Oliver Klemm – guitar; Vanessa Anne Redd - vocals, percussion, piano; Thomsen Slowey Merkel – bass
- Past members: Ted Chau – guitar; Chris Van Helsing – guitar; Taif Ball – bass; Voodoo – voodoo drums, drums; Der Rabe (Guido Eickelmann † 2015) – drums; Pia Lund – vocals; David Rebel – guitar; Maik T. – bass; Pris – vocals; Thari - vocals, percussion; Thilo Erhardt - bass
- Website: www.phillipboa.com

Phillip Boa and the Voodooclub is a German avant-garde pop and independent music band, led by the songwriter, singer and guitarist Phillip Boa.

== History ==
Phillip Boa and the Voodooclub was formed by Phillip Boa in 1985. The group's original line-up consisted of Pia Lund, Voodoo and Der Rabe. In the same year, the band released their debut album, Philister. Philister was released on the Label JA! Music and landed in the German Indie-Charts. Following the release in 1986, Philister was sold throughout Europe by the label Red Flame. The second album, Aristocracie, was released by Phillip Boa and the Voodooclub on the label Constrictor (Phillip Boa's own label). It was produced by Eroc, a student of the producer Conny Plank. This album reached tenth place in the independent music magazine Spex's charts for the year 1986. The band began touringin Europe since 1987. Phillip Boa and the Voodooclub's next three albums, Copperfield and Hair, were released through Polydor Records after they signed a contract with the label. With the single Container Love (1989), they achieved commercial success and international recognition. In 1991, the album Helios was released on Polydor Records.

After Boaphenia (released in 1993 on the label Motor Music), Phillip Boa committed himself to his Metal project Voodoocult. Further albums (God, 1994, She, 1996, Lord Garbage, 1998) were released in the following period on Motor Music. Alison Galea from the Maltese band Beangrowers took the place of Pia Lund after she left the band between 1997 and 2003. The Beangrowers were backed by Phillip Boa and performed in 2000 as the support band for concerts from Phillip Boa and the Voodooclub. Annually, since 2001, the band plays two or three Christmas concerts in the Leipziger Moritzbastei.

Between the years 2000 and 2003, Phillip Boa and the Voodooclub released a total of three albums on the Label Sony/BMG-RCA (My Private War, 2000, The Red, 2001, C 90, 2003). In 2005, the album Decadence & Isolation was released on the label Motor Music. That album was influenced by 1980s bands like The Cure and Joy Division. In autumn of 2006, Boa with the Voodooclub went on their Remastered tour. On this tour, they only played songs from the three re-released remastered records Copperfield, Hair and Hispanola. In 2007, the album Faking to Blend In was released on Motor Music. In February 2009, the album Diamonds Fall was released on Rough Trade Records. For this album, the drummer from Can (Jaki Liebezeit) joined them as a drummer and percussionist with the Voodooclub. In the summer of 2010, the live album Exile on Strait Street was released on their own label Constrictor. The albums Helios and Boaphenia were remastered and released in the spring of 2011 on Vertigo Records/Universal.

In August 2012, the studio album Loyalty was released on Cargo Records. The album was recorded in Malta and London. It was produced by David Vella, Boa and Brian Viglione, mixed by Ian Grimble in London and mastered by Frank Arkwright in Abbey Road Studios. In the same year, John Robb (a renowned English music critic) wrote in Louder Than War Magazine: "One of the best German bands of the last three decades, Phillip Boa and the Voodooclub have been on a creative surge recently. Their recent album of melancholic post indie is a great piece of work."

In 2013 the fan album Reduced! was released. The album was recorded in the winter of 2012 in the Moritzbastei. The album was intended to reflect "the dirt and the intensity from a intimate club concert". Only the instrumentation was worked out in studio, the mistakes were uncorrected. Also in 2013, a significant change in the band's lineup occurred when Pia Lund left the group.. From 2014 on, the band has worked with different female guest singers.

On 22 August 2014 the studio album Bleach House was released on Cargo Records and reached place 7 in the album charts (the highest chart placing the band has reached to date). The album was produced by David Vella on Malta and was mixed at the Konk Studios in London by Dougal Lott. It was mastered by Fred Kevorkian in the Avatar Studios in New York.

Phillip Boa and the Voodooclub is one of a few German bands that has reached international fame and recognition by critics and fans. To this day, they are the German band that has achieved the most "Albums of the week" and "Single of the week" in the British music press (8 x "Single of the week" and 5 x "Album of the week" in NME, Melody Maker and Sounds). Phillip Boa was in the top 20 of the list "Made in Germany – The Most Influential German musicians" (on laut.de) Furthermore, he stands as a sharp observer of society and a distinguished songwriter in Germany. NME described his work as being of "a cynical-poetic view, full of mysterious metaphors and sharp wisdom".

After many busy years and more than 2 million sold albums, on 16 September 2016, the single collection Blank Expression – A History Of Singles 1986-2016 was released on Capitol Records/Universal Music and reached place 8 in the German album charts. The collection included the band's most well-known singles, as well an album of 12 new songs entitled Fresco – A Collection Of 12 New Songs.

2018 their Top 3 album "Earthly Powers" (Cargo Records) was the band's last official album. Capitol Records/Universal Music released extensive anniversary editions of "Boaphenia" (2023) and "Copperfield" (2024), followed by the 2025 anniversary edition of their internationally praised, award winning album "Hair" incl. 10 new songs, which reached the Top 3 of the official album charts.

The Voodooclub have shared the stage with many other bands and musicians, including David Bowie, Bob Dylan, John Lydon's Public Image Ltd., Nick Cave, Sonic Youth, Björk, The Fall, Residents, Gun Club, Iggy Pop und Manic Street Preachers. The Voodooclub has been produced by Tony Visconti (David Bowie), John Leckie (Morrissey, New Order), Gareth Jones (Interpol, Depeche Mode), Gordon Raphael (Strokes), Ian Grimble (Manic Street Preachers, Bauhaus, Mumford and Sons), etc. They have also worked together with Aphex Twin, LFO, Schneider TM, The Notwist, Jaki Liebezeit (CAN) as well as Brian Viglione (Dresden Dolls, Nine Inch Nails).

== Musical style ==
Boas music is influenced by British post-punk, indie/alternative rock and avant-garde. Common characteristics are catchy melodic choruses, which are piercing and distorted to reflect to the mood changes. Other prominent features of Boa's music is clashing high notes, melodic singing and melancholic harmonizing vocals.

== Discography ==
=== Studio albums by Phillip Boa & The Voodooclub ===
- 1985: Philister (Ja! Musik) – German Independent charts #1
- 1986: Aristocracie (Constrictor) – German Independent charts #1
- 1988: Copperfield (Polydor) – German charts #53
- 1989: Hair (Polydor) – German charts #23
- 1990: Hispañola (Polydor) – German charts #14
- 1991: Helios (Polydor) – German charts #20
- 1993: Boaphenia (Polydor) – German charts #15
- 1994: God (Motor Music) – German charts #23
- 1996: She (Motor Music) – German charts #32
- 1998: Lord Garbage (Motor Music) – German charts #22
- 2000: My Private War (RCA/BMG) – German charts #23
- 2001: The Red (RCA/BMG) – German charts #59
- 2003: C 90 (RCA/BMG) – German charts #46
- 2005: Decadence & Isolation (Motor Music) – German charts #40
- 2007: Faking To Blend In (Motor Music) – German charts #59
- 2009: Diamonds Fall (Rough Trade/Constrictor) – German charts #45
- 2012: Loyalty (Cargo Records/Constrictor) – German charts #13
- 2014: Bleach House (Cargo Records/Constrictor) – German charts #7
- 2016: Blank Expression (Capitol Records/Vertigo Berlin) – German charts #8
- 2018: Earthly Powers (Cargo Records/Constrictor) – German charts #3
- 2023: Boaphenia Re-Edition (Capitol Records/Vertigo Berlin) - German charts #10
- 2024: Copperfield Re-Edition (Capitol Records/Vertigo Berlin) - German charts #12
- 2025: Hair Re-Edition (Capitol Records/Vertigo Berlin) - German charts #3

=== Compilations, Live and Re-Releases ===
- 1986: Philistrines (Red Flame, UK)
- 1989: 30 Years of Blank Expression (DiDi, Greece)
- 1991: Live! Exile On Valletta Street (Polydor)
- 1994: Hidden Pearls (Fanclub Release)
- 1996: Hidden Pearls & Spoken Words (Fanclub Release)
- 1997: Fine Art On Silver – Best Of (Motor Music) – German charts #28
- 1998: Master Series Best Of (Re-Release "Fine Art On Silver") (Motor Music)
- 2001: Singles Collection 1985–2001 Best Of (RCA/BMG)
- 2005: BOA Best Singles Best Of (Remastered) (Polydor/Universal)
- 2006: Copperfield (Remastered) (Polydor/Universal)
- 2006: Hair (Remastered) (Polydor/Universal)
- 2006: Hispañola (Remastered) (Polydor/Universal)
- 2010: The Malta Tapes, Vol. 1 (Constrictor)
- 2010: Live! Exile on Strait Street (Constrictor)
- 2011: Helios (Remastered) (Vertigo/Universal)
- 2011: Boaphenia (Remastered) (Vertigo/Universal)
- 2013: Reduced! (A more or less acoustic performance) (Constrictor)
- 2015: Aristocracie (Remastered) (Constrictor)
- 2016: Blank Expression: A History Of Singles 1986-2016 (Capitol/Universal) – German charts #8
