= Viktoriya Yermolyeva =

German pianist (born 1978)

Vika Yermolyeva
- Born: Viktoriya Yermolyeva; 2 November 1978 (age 47); Kyiv, Ukrainian Soviet Socialist Republic, Soviet Union
- Genres: Classical, rock, heavy metal, Punk, Pop
- Occupation: Pianist
- Instruments: Piano, digital piano, vocals, keyboard, synthesizer
- Labels: Vikatine Productions
- Website: www.vkgoeswild.com

Viktoriya "Vika" Yermolyeva (Ukrainian: Вікторія Єрмольєва, born 2 November 1978, also known as vkgoeswild) is a Ukrainian born pianist, composer and YouTube personality. In her early career she studied and played classical music. Later, she became known for piano covers of rock and heavy metal songs.

== Career ==
Yermolyeva started playing piano at the age of 4. After studying at the Tchaikovsky Music Academy in Ukraine (2000), she completed her graduate studies at the University of Music FRANZ LISZT in Weimar, and the International Piano Academy "Incontri col Maestro" in Imola, Italy, with the famous pianist Lazar Berman. Further studies took her to the Codarts Academy of Music and Modern Dance, at Rotterdam Conservatory, Netherlands.

In the early classical phase of her career, she won a variety of piano competitions, such as 1st Prize at "Filippo Trevisan" competition for Piano Interpretation in Italy, winner of The Grachtenfestival 2005 Amsterdam, 1st Prize at 35th International Competition "Vincenzo Bellini" in Italy, 1st Prize at 20th International Piano Competition "Citta di Marsala", 1st Prize at International Piano Competition "Citta' Di Trani", 1st Prize at 4th Sigismund Thalberg International Competition, and the Grand Prix at 9th Pierre Lantier International Music Competition in duet with V. Dmitriev (flute) in France.

In 2003, Yermolyeva explored jazz music and studied with Leonid Chizhik.

Since 2008, she has focused her career on playing rock music, concentrating on heavy metal covers by many famous metal bands. Her web videos have over 80 million views.

On 29 January 2011 she performed her first live rock concert in Reykjavík, Iceland (VIGGIE & VIKA: Live in Iceland) collaborating with drummer Brian Viglione.

In 2016, Yermolyeva released an album that was a mix of covers and original compositions. It was funded via the crowdfunding platform PledgeMusic, and was entitled "Fan's Edition".

In 2020, Yermolyeva released the album Happiness is not the Point consisting of original compositions. On the album she plays the piano as well as providing singing and spoken word.

== Personal life ==
Yermolyeva currently resides with her pets in Austria. She enjoys various crafts. Yermolyeva speaks Ukrainian, Russian, English, and German. Yermolyeva holds amongst her native Ukrainian citizenship the German citizenship as well.

== Discography ==
- 2016 Fan's edition (Run United)
- 2020 Happiness is not the Point
- 2024 Live at SynthFest
- 2024 Dark imperfect (Vinyl)

== Awards ==
- 2004 – Sigismund Thalberg International Piano Prize, Naples, 4th Edition (First prize)
- 2005 – Grachtenfestival, Codarts, Rotterdam (winner of the Jury Prize)
