= Voodoocult (album) =

Studio album by Voodoocult
- Released: 1995
- Recorded: October–November 1994
- Studio: Ocean Studios, Burbank, Los Angeles
- Genre: Thrash metal
- Length: 47:59
- Label: Motor
- Producer: Tommy Newton, Phillip Boa

Voodoocult chronology
Jesus Killing Machine (1994)	Voodoocult (1995)

Voodoocult is the second and last album by heavy metal band Voodoocult, released in 1995.

== Release ==
The album was issued on CD and double vinyl. The double vinyl edition with limited circulation of 1.000 and the Japanese edition contained two bonus tracks. The track "Death of a Kung Fu fighter" from the same sessions was not part of the album. However, its lyrics were printed in the booklet and it was released in 1996 on the single When Love Gets Terminated by Phillip Boa & The Voodooclub.

== Track listing ==
All lyrics are written by Phillip Boa.

No.	Title	Music	Length
1.	"Welcome to a New Season of Deathwish"	Gabby Abularach	3:19
2.	"King of the Beautiful Cockroach"	David Ball, David Vella, Abularach	4:12
3.	"The Stranger" (From the original Phillip Boa & The Voodooclub song "Skull")	Phillip Boa, Guido Eickelmann, Pia Lund, Voodoo	2:42
4.	"I Close My Eyes Before I Bleed to Death"	Ball	5:02
5.	"When You Live as a Boy"	Abularach	4:25
6.	"Exorcized by a Kiss"	Boa	4:26
7.	"Cliffhanger on a Bloody Sunday"	Ball	5:10
8.	"Violenca"	Boa, Ball, Abularach	4:44
9.	"Egomania"	Vella, Ball	4:46
10.	"Die Erotik der Maschine"	Abularach	4:24
11.	"Electrified Scum"	Ball	3:38

Double vinyl edition and Japanese edition bonus tracks
No.	Title	Music	Length
12.	"Angry Hearts & Soldiers"	Abularach	2:48
13.	"Coma in Cuba"	Boa	3:29

== Chart positions ==
Chart (1995)	Peak position
German Albums (Offizielle Top 100)	57

== Personnel ==
=== Voodoocult ===
- Phillip Boa – vocals
- Gabby Abularach – guitar
- Jim Martin – guitar
- Dave Ball – bass
- Markus Freiwald – drums
- Moses Pellberg – samples

=== Additional personnel ===
- Tommy Newton – production, engineering, mastering
- Eric Smith – engineering
- David Vella – pre-production, vocal production
- Wolfgang Scheideler – guitar recording
- Dirk Rudolph – design, photography
