= Hanna Shybayeva =

Dutch pianist

Hanna Shybayeva (born 16 March 1979 in Minsk) is a Dutch pianist.

== Early life and studies ==
Born into a family of musicians, Hanna Shybayeva began her piano education at the age of six.

In 1995, she got a piano degree at the Belarus National College of Music. After graduating school she studied at the Belarus Academy of Music Minsk until 1998. From 1998 to 1999, she studied at Hochschule für Musik Dortmund (Germany) and at the International Music Academy "Ivo Pogorelich" Lovran (Croatia). In 1999, she began her studies with Naum Grubert at the Royal Conservatory The Hague in the Netherlands where she got her Bachelor of Music degree in 2003 and also received her Master of Music degree "with distinction" two years later. Under patron of Rudolf Jansen she specialized in lieder accompaniment from 2008 to 2010.

== Artistic activities ==
Hanna Shybayeva had appearances with the Russian State Symphony Orchestra, the Belarus State Symphony Orchestra, the Dortmund Chamber Orchestra, the Minneapolis Symphony Orchestra, the Belgrade Symphony Orchestra, the Gelders Orkest, the North Netherlands Orchestra and the Niederrheinisches Kammerochester. She collaborated with conductors such as Lydia O’Riordan, Moshe Atzmon, Joachim Simon, Alexander Anisimov, Angel Shurev, Marc Russel-Smith, Yaron Traub, Gennadi Provatorov and Neeme Järvi.

She gave solo and chamber music recitals in Russia, Germany, Switzerland, Sweden, Italy, Serbia, Ireland, the US, Canada, Belgium and the Netherlands. Festival performances include among others Festival Classique Den Haag, West Cork Chamber Music Festival, International Chamber Music Festival Utrecht, Gergiev Festival Rotterdam, Grachtenfestival Amsterdam, Sound Of Stockholm Festival, Ticino Musica Festival Switzerland and Festival van Vlaanderen Belgium. She performed for TV and Radio stations in Germany, Serbia, Belarus, Russia, the US, the Netherlands and Canada.

From 2009 to present, she is a core member of the New European Ensemble (EU) and also of the chamber music project “Symphonic Intimacy” with Ysaye String Trio (the Netherlands). In 2010, she founded the White Crow Music Festival Leiden (Netherlands) and was its artistic director until 2015.

== Prizes and awards ==
- 1995 - Grant from the International Program “New Names”, Moscow (Russia)
- 1997 - Grant from the Spivakov Foundation, Moscow (Russia)
- 2001 - YPF National Piano Competition Amsterdam (Netherlands), 1st Prize and Grand Prix (solo album recording with Phillips Classics)
- 2002 - Grant from the Yamaha Music Foundation Europe
- 2004 - Grant from the Prince Bernhard Cultural Foundation (Netherlands)
- 2015 - Edison Klassik Award 2015 (‘Sounds of War’ CD production)

== Discography ==
- Let’s Dance! (2017). Hanna Shybayeva. Live Recording. Works by Couperin, Scarlatti, Chopin, Debussy, Gershwin and Kapustin. Published by ARS Production.
- Studio Konzert (2016). LP. Hanna Shybayeva. Works by Couperin, Scarlatti, Chopin, Debussy, Gershwin and Kapustin. Published by Neuklang / Bauer Studios Ludwigsburg.
- Symphonic Intimacy (2015). Ysaye String Trio and Hanna Shybayeva, piano. Works by Beethoven and Mahler. Published by DRC.
- Sounds of War (2015). Hanna Shybayeva (piano) and Maria Milstein (violin). Works by Janáček, Poulenc, Prokofiev. Published by Cobra Records.
- Playing with Autism 1.0 (2014). Hanna Shybayeva plays Simona Concaro.
- Pianologues (2014). Duo with Gianluca di Ienno (jazz piano). Works by Debussy, Takemitsu, Ligeti, F.Say, G. di Ienno. Recorded in Pavia, Italy.
- Unconditional Music (2014). Hanna Shybayeva (piano) and Yulia Berinskaya (violin). Works by Grieg, Bartok, Gershwin and Piazzolla. Published by Limen Music Milano.
- Echos of Japan (2013). Hanna Shybayeva, piano. Works by Takemitsu and Hesketh. Published by Teriyaki Records.
- Hanna Shybayeva: Complete Works for Piano Solo. Sergei Rachmaninoff (2012). Etudes-Tableaux, op. 33 / Etudes-Tableaux, op.39. Published by Etcetera/Codaex.
- Silent Echos (2011). With Carina Vinke (alto) and Hanna Shybayeva (piano). Works by Sibelius, Schumann, Staern and Skriabin. Poroduction by New European Ensemble.
- Duo CD recording with Dovlet Nurgeldiyev (2010) by Deutsche Grammophon.
- Hanna Shybayeva (Piano): Schubert (2008). Sonata in A major D959 / Sonata in A minor D784. Published by Brilliant Classics.
- Hanna Shybayeva. Works by Shostakovich, Ravel, Chopin and Prokofiev (2001). Published by Philips Classics.
- Hanna Shybayeva. Works by Chopin, Scarlatti, Rachmaninof, Debussy and Klein (1999). Published by Dutch Gramophone.
