= Radiator King =

American punk/blues singer-songwriter and guitarist

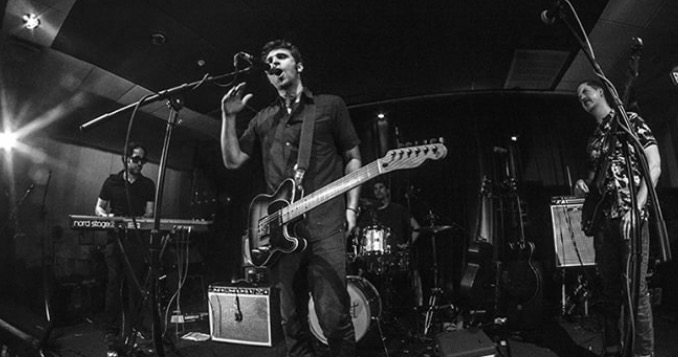
- Radiator King at ONCE Somerville

Background information
- Origin: Boston, MA, U.S.
- Genres: Alternative rock; indie rock; acoustic; folk
- Years active: 1997–present
- Website: www.radiatorkingmusic.com

Adam Silvestri, known professionally as Radiator King, is an American punk/blues singer-songwriter and guitarist from Boston, Massachusetts. He is the lead vocalist and sole member of the act, occasionally using a supporting band while on tour and in studio. When asked about the name Radiator King, Silvestri stated that it came from when he "titled a friend’s painting and it was suggested to him that he use that name for his next band".

Silvestri has been recognized for his "rough, heart-wrenching vocals" and gritty sound. Established officially in 2011, Radiator King has released three studio albums, Launching Day, Document Untold, and A Hollow Triumph After All.

Radiator King most recently toured this summer in support of A Hollow Triumph After All. During off days, Silvestri wrote and recorded new songs for a future release. Independent record label, SoundEvolution Music (SI, NY) will be releasing three of these tracks on an upcoming 7" vinyl single.

== Band members ==
- Adam Silvestri - vocals, guitar

== Touring members ==
- Shaul Eshet - piano, organ, vibraphone, synth
- Adam Moses - drums, percussion
- Ed "Harlem Wolverine" Goldson - bass
- Brian Viglione - drums, percussion

== Discography ==
- Unborn Ghosts (2019)
- A Hollow Triumph After All (2017)
- Document Untold (2015)
- Launching Day (2012)
