= New European Ensemble =

- Origin: The Hague, Netherlands
- Genres: Contemporary classical
- Occupations: Ensemble for 20th and 21st century music
- Years active: 2008-present
- Members: Principal conductor and Artistic director Christian Karlsen (2009-14), Emlyn Stam (2014- ) Principal musicians Felica van den End, flute Christopher Bouwman, oboe James Meldrum, clarinet Ryanne Hofman, bass clarinet Amber Mallee, bassoon Hanna Shybayeva, piano Małgorzata Walentynowicz, piano Jacob Kellermann, guitar Astrid Haring, harp Mihkel Kerem, violin Rada Ovcharova, violin Emlyn Stam, viola Willem Stam, cello Ryan Linham, trumpet Jose ‘Pepe’ Garcia Rodriguez, percussion Porter Ellerman, percussion Ryoko Imai, percussion
- Website: www.neue.nl

New European Ensemble is an ensemble, currently based in the Netherlands, that specializes in contemporary music.

== About ==
New European Ensemble was founded in 2008 in The Hague. The group is made up of young soloists, chamber musicians and orchestral leaders from across Europe. The ensemble has received numerous accolades in the international press for its ‘contagious enthusiasm’ (Nutida Musik) and ‘excellent’ (Volkskrant) performances.

The group has performed in most of the Netherlands' major concert halls including Muziekgebouw aan 't IJ Amsterdam, Dr. Anton Philipszaal Den Haag and De Doelen Rotterdam. In 2010 the ensemble toured Sweden for the first time starting in Västerås Concerthall with subsequent performances in Stockholm, Gothenburg and Malmö. In June/July 2011 they performed for the first time in the UK.

In November 2011 New European Ensemble was featured on Dutch National TV in the programme NTR Podium where they performed Joey Roukens's piece Mad Men.

The Swedish conductor Christian Karlsen was during 2009 until 2014 its artistic director, followed by Emlyn Stam.

In 2019 the ensemble received the Kersjesprijs, a Dutch prize awarded annually to a chamber ensemble. In 2025 it was awarded the Nieuw Geneco Fair Practice Award, which recognises initiatives that promote fair collaboration between composers and performers.

The ensemble frequently develops interdisciplinary projects that combine contemporary music with literature, film and social themes. Selected productions include:

== Collaboration with Amnesty International ==
In 2009, the New European Ensemble mounted a collaboration project together with Amnesty International for a performance of Hans Werner Henze's monumental song cycle Voices. In this work from 1973, Henze set 22 poems about human rights and freedom of speech. These texts where combined with photos from Amnesty International's collection that portrays the human rights today. A large education project at the Hague University was also connected to the performances.

== Saariaho Festival Den Haag ==
New European Ensemble initiated and produced a three-day festival in October 2011 around the Finnish composer Kaija Saariaho. The festival was a collaborative project with The Hague's major music organisations including the Residentie Orchestra, Dr. Anton Philipszaal, the Royal Conservatoire and Dag in the Branding. During the festival's seven concerts a large portion of Kaija Saariaho's most important works were performed. Also numerous works were performed in the Netherlands for the first time during the festival. The New European Ensemble performed Saariaho's complete works for large ensemble during three concerts.

== Seeing Without Seeing (Mavericks) ==
is a project developed in collaboration with former Rotterdam mayor Ahmed Aboutaleb and Syrian clarinetist Kinan Azmeh. The programme combines music by Hawar Tawfiq and Azmeh with poetry and spoken reflections exploring themes of perception and inner freedom.

== 1984 ==
is a multidisciplinary production based on the novel by George Orwell, with a new score by Estonian composer Mihkel Kerem. The project includes video contributions by whistleblower Edward Snowden and performances by Dutch actor Boris van der Ham, addressing themes of surveillance and privacy.

== Seasonal Quartet ==
is a literary-musical project inspired by the novels of Scottish writer Ali Smith. Four composers — Anna Thorvaldsdottir, Cheryl Frances-Hoad, Bushra El-Turk and Dobrinka Tabakova — created new works related to Smith’s seasonal novels, with spoken text by the author.
