= Phillip Boa =

German musician and songwriter

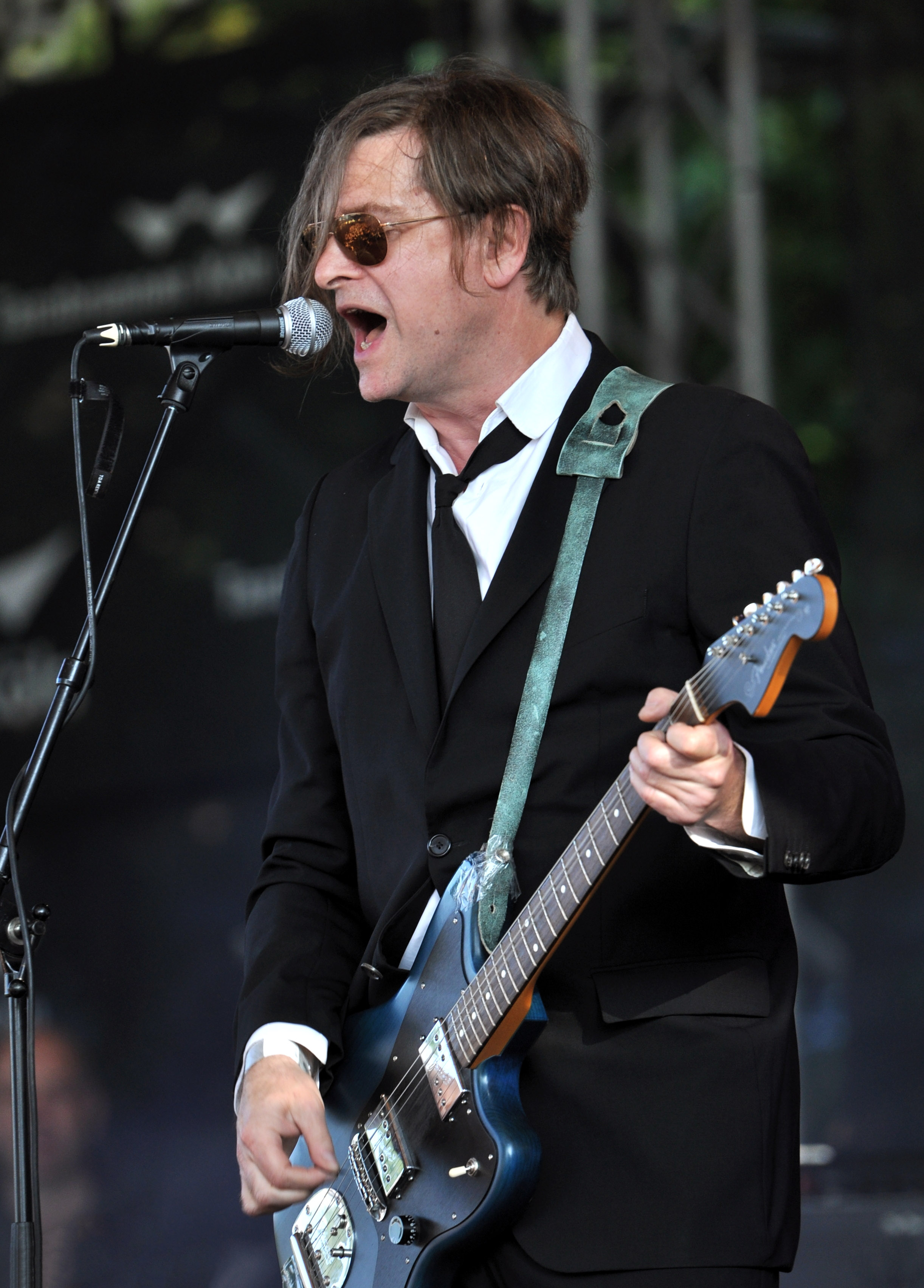
- Boa performing in 2013

Background information
- Born: Ernst Ulrich Figgen; 18 January 1963 (age 63); Dortmund, Germany
- Genres: Independent
- Occupations: Musician, songwriter, composer
- Instruments: Vocals, guitar
- Years active: 1985–present
- Labels: Cargo Records, Universal
- Website: phillipboa.com

Phillip Boa (born Ernst Ulrich Figgen; 18 January 1963) is a German independent musician, songwriter, singer, guitarist and composer. The musical style followed by Boa and his band Phillip Boa & The Voodooclub was described in a review by NME as "a cross between B52's and Captain Beefheart". The style of his lyrics is a mix of irony, love songs, sarcasm and is often of bizarre and deranged content. Boa has written over 400 songs, and 21 of his studio albums made it to the top 60 of the charts.

== Career ==
In 1985, he founded the independent band Phillip Boa and the Voodooclub. With their album Hair and the single "Container Love", they experienced a commercial breakthrough and international recognition in 1989.

Boa's music is influenced by British punk rock and new wave; its style swings between pop and avantgarde. A continuous charasteric are the catchy and melodic choruses, interrupted or alienated by atmospheric shifts. Thereby the voice of band member Pia Lund and Boa's own throaty singing contrast diametrically. After his most successful album so far, Boaphenia (1993), Boa made a deliberate musical cut to focus on a Metal project when founded the heavy metal band Voodoocult, consisting of members Dave Lombardo (drums), Chuck Schuldiner (guitar), Waldemar Sorychta (guitar), Mille Petrozza (guitar) and himself as vocalist.

The autumn of 2006 saw Boa and his Voodooclub start their Remastered tour. They consequently only played songs from the three re-published albums Copperfield, Hair and Hispañola. Moreover, since 2001, they play two or three annual Christmas concerts at the Leipzig Moritzbastei fortress. On 3 August 2007, the album Faking to Blend In was released on Motor Music.

In 2009, the Voodooclub teamed up with Can drummer the late Jaki Liebezeit, who played percussion and drums on their album Diamonds Fall. The album Loyalty brought them a commercial comeback in Germany (No. 13 in the album charts) and some other countries. The album was produced by David Vella and Brian Viglione, who also played drums and other instruments on the album. Loyalty was mixed by Ian Grimble and mastered by Frank Arkwright at Abbey Road Studios.

In 2014 the studio album Bleach House was released on Cargo Records, which reached place 7 in the German album charts, the best chart position in the history of the band. The album was produced by David Vella on Malta and was mixed in London, at the Konk Studios London by Dougal Lott. It was mastered by Fred Kevorkian in the New Yorker Avatar Studios.

After many intensive years and more than 2 million sold albums, the single collection Blank Expression – A History of Singles 1986–2016 was released on 16 September 2016 on Capitol Records/Universal Music. It reached rank 8 in the German album charts. Apart from the most important singles, the collection included also twelve new songs from the album Fresco – A Collection of 12 New Songs.

2018 their Top 3 album "Earthly Powers" (Cargo Records) was the band's last official album. Capitol Records/Universal Music released extensive anniversary editions of "Boaphenia" (2023) and "Copperfield" (2024), followed by the 2025 anniversary edition of their internationally praised, award-winning album "Hair" incl. 10 new songs, which reached the Top 3 of the official album charts.

== Reception ==
"Phillip Boa and the Voodooclub belong to the most prestigious German bands, which is also recognized from international critics and fans." (ARD Germany's and the world's largest public broadcaster).

Phillip Boa was in the top 20 of the survey "Made in Germany – The Most Influential German musicians" (laut.de). Furthermore, he stands as one of the sharpest observers of our society and a distinguished songwriter in Germany, with "a cynical-poetic view, full of mysterious metaphors and sharp wisdom." (NME)

Several of Boa's albums have reached the top 30 of the German Media Control Charts. In 2012, British music journalist John Robb called Phillip Boa and the Voodooclub "one of the best German bands of the last three decades".

In their song "Wir sind die Besten" (We are the Best), German band Die Ärzte sing about Phillip Boa, depicting themselves and Boa as the last true musicians.

== Discography ==
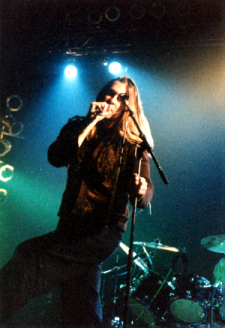
Boa performing with Voodoocult in 1995

=== Studio albums by Phillip Boa & The Voodooclub ===
Year	Title	Official German Charts	
1985	Philister: Label: Ja! Musik	—	
1986	Aristocracie: Label: Constrictor	—	
1987	Copperfield: Label: Polydor / Universal	47	
1988	Hair: Label: Polydor / Universal	26	
1990	Hispañola: Label: Polydor / Universal	14	
1991	Helios: Label: Polydor / Universal	32	
1993	Boaphenia: Label: Polydor / Universal	15	
1994	God: Label: Motor / Universal	23	
1995	She: Label: Motor / Universal	32	
2000	My Private War: Label: RCA / BMG Sony	23	
2001	The Red: Label: RCA / BMG Sony	59	
2003	C 90: Label: RCA / BMG Sony	46	
2005	Decadence & Isolation: Label: Motor Music	40	
2007	Faking To Blend In: Label: Motor Music	59	
2009	Diamonds Fall: Label: Rough Trade / Constrictor	45	
2012	Loyalty: Label: Cargo Records / Constrictor	13	
2014	Bleach House: Label: Cargo Records / Constrictor	7	
2016	Blank Expression: Label: Capitol Records / Vertigo Berlin	8	
2018	Earthly Powers: Label: Cargo Records / Constrictor	3	
2023	Boaphenia (Re-Edition): Label: Capitol Records / Vertigo Berlin	10	
2024	Copperfield (Re-Edition): Label: Capitol Records / Vertigo Berlin	12	
2025	Hair (Re-Edition): Label: Capitol Records / Vertigo Berlin	3	"—" denotes releases that did not chart

=== Solo album ===
Year	Title	Official German Charts
1998	Lord Garbage: Label: Motor Music	22

=== Studio albums by Voodoocult ===
Year	Title	Media Control Charts
1994	Jesus Killing Machine: Label: Motor Music	43
1995	Voodoocult: Label: Motor Music	57

=== Samplers, live albums and re-releases ===
- 1986: Philistrines (Red Flame, UK)
- 1989: 30 Years of Blank Expression (DiDi, Greece)
- 1991: Live! Exile On Valletta Street (Polydor)
- 1994: Hidden Pearls (Fanclub Release)
- 1996: Hidden Pearls & Spoken Words (Fanclub Release)
- 1997: Fine Art On Silver Best Of (Motor Music)
- 1997: Aristocracie Remastered (Indigo)
- 1998: Master Series Best of (Re-release "Fine Art On Silver") (Motor Music)
- 2001: Singles Collection 1985–2001 Best of (RCA/BMG) #28
- 2005: BOA Best Singles Best of Remastered (Polydor/Universal)
- 2006: Copperfield Remastered (Polydor/Universal)
- 2006: Hair Remastered (Polydor/Universal)
- 2006: Hispañola Remastered (Polydor/Universal)
- 2011: Helios Remastered (Vertigo/Universal)
- 2011: Boaphenia Remastered (Vertigo/Universal)
- 2016: Blank Expression: A History Of Singles 1986–2016 Best Of (Universal) #8
