= A Hollow Triumph After All =

Studio album by Radiator King
- Released: April 28, 2017
- Recorded: 2016
- Studio: Vibromonk Studios
- Genre: Rock; alternative rock; indie folk
- Length: 37:32
- Producer: Jesse Cannon

Radiator King chronology
Document Untold (2015)	A Hollow Triumph After All (2017)

A Hollow Triumph After All is the third studio album by American singer-songwriter Radiator King. It was independently released on April 28, 2017.

A Hollow Triumph After All is a concept album, described as “a telling of situations that mark the passing of time.” Sole member Adam Silvestri explains, “It’s this character walking through scenes in his life, experiences he’s had...In the end, he’s sort of depleted, exhausted, recollecting back on life and recognizing that the end destination he sought the whole time wasn’t as important as he thought.”

The album has been met with positive reviews, with The Santa Fe New Mexican stating, “it is punk, guttural, and often joyful in its whiskey-soaked sadness”

== Track listing ==
A Hollow Triumph After All
No.	Title	Length
1.	"After All"	2:31
2.	"The Guns You Pawned"	2:59
3.	"Ghost Dance"	3:48
4.	"Christmas Eve"	4:59
5.	"So Long (Charlie)"	3:39
6.	"Second Thoughts in Memphis"	2:31
7.	"Murray's Hurried Blues"	3:31
8.	"Someday"	2:28
9.	"Too Mean to Die"	2:19
10.	"Underdog"	2:22
11.	"Singer of Songs"	3:47
12.	"Sammy's Song"	3:02

== Personnel ==
Radiator King

- Adam Silvestri – guitar and vocals

Additional musicians

- Shaul Eshet – piano, organ, vibraphone, synth
- Brian Viglione – drums, percussion
- Jordan Scannella – electric bass, upright bass
- Adam Brisbin – lead guitar
- Peter Hess – bass clarinet, tenor saxophone, horn arrangements
- Tim Vaughn – trombone
- Justin Mullens – trumpet, French horn
- Franz Nicolay – accordion
