= Jazz in Marciac =

Music festival in Marciac since 1978

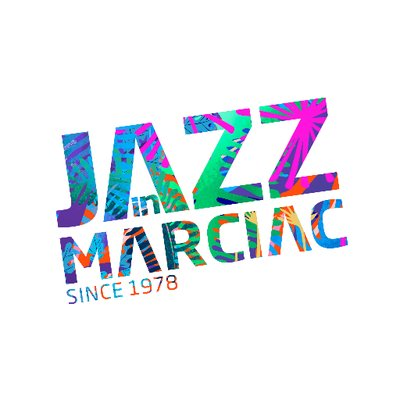
- 2018 logo
- Genre: Jazz, blues
- Frequency: Annually
- Locations: Marciac, Gers, Occitania; France
- Years active: 1978-present
- Founders: André Muller; Jean-Louis Guilhaumon
- Website: jazzinmarciac.com

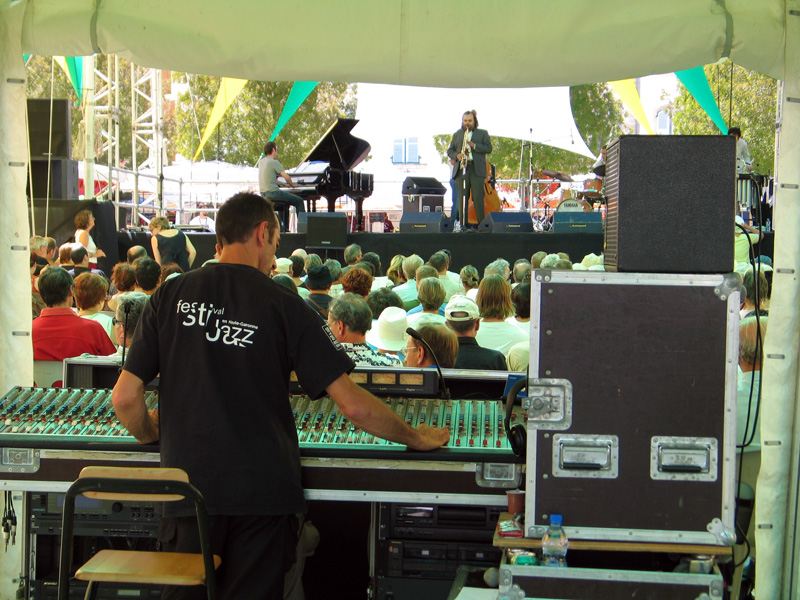
Jazz in Marciac 2005

Jazz in Marciac (JIM) is an annual jazz festival that takes place in Marciac, Occitania, France. The festival takes place over a period of three weeks, usually from late July to mid-August. The first festival took place in 1978.

== Programs ==
The festival has hosted many internationally renowned musicians such as:

- Céline Bonacina – French saxophonist and composer
- Dee Dee Bridgewater – American jazz singer (born 1950)
- Melanie De Biasio – Belgian jazz singer, flutist and composer
- Buena Vista Social Club – Cuban musical ensemble
- Ray Charles – American singer, songwriter and pianist (1930–2004)
- Bill Coleman – American jazz trumpeter (1904–1981)
- Paquito D'Rivera – Cuban saxophonist, clarinetist and composer (born 1948)
- Ibrahim Ferrer – Cuban singer (1927–2005)
- Lionel Hampton – American jazz vibraphonist, percussionist, and bandleader (1908–2002)
- Stan Getz – American jazz saxophonist (1927–1991)
- Dizzy Gillespie – American jazz trumpeter (1917–1993)
- Stéphane Grappelli – French jazz violinist (1908–1997)
- Herbie Hancock – American jazz pianist and composer (born 1940)
- Hiromi – Japanese musician and composer
- Keith Jarrett – American pianist and composer (born 1945)
- Norah Jones – American singer-songwriter and musician (born 1979)
- Diana Krall – Canadian jazz singer and pianist (born 1964)
- Biréli Lagrène – French born jazz guitarist (born 1966)
- Eddy Louiss – French jazz musician (1941–2015)
- Wynton Marsalis – American jazz trumpeter (born 1961)
- Marcus Miller – American musician, composer and producer (born 1959)
- le Modern Jazz Quartet – American jazz ensemble
- Gerry Mulligan – American jazz saxophonist and clarinetist (1927–1996)
- Oscar Peterson – Canadian jazz pianist (1925–2007)
- Michel Petrucciani – French jazz pianist (1962–1999)
- Michel Portal – French composer, saxophonist and clarinetist (1935–2026)
- Dianne Reeves – American jazz singer (born 1956)
- Sonny Rollins – American jazz saxophonist and composer (1930–2026)
- Veronica Swift – American jazz and bebop singer (b. 1994)
- Chucho Valdés – Cuban pianist, bandleader, composer and arranger (born 1941)
- Joe Zawinul – Austrian jazz keyboardist and composer (1932–2007)
- John Zorn – American composer, saxophonist and bandleader (born 1953)
