= Blaise Garza =

American actor and musician (born 1989)

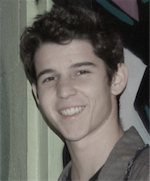
- Blaise Garza
- Born: February 10, 1989 (age 37); Tampa Bay, Florida
- Occupations: Actor, musician

Blaise Garrett Garza (born February 10, 1989) is an American actor and musician.

== Acting career ==
From 1994 to 1996, Garza played the role of Gregory Hudson, the son of John (David Forsyth) and Sharlene Hudson (Anna Kathryn Holbrook), on Another World. Garza's hiring was the first audition he had ever been on. He later appeared in various television commercials and was the poster child for White House Juice, appearing as "Jimmy Juice". After various commercials and industrials, Blaise was cast in his first feature film, Yukie (aka Solitude Point), in 1998, playing the grandson of Bo Svenson and Mitsuko Baisho. Blaise appeared in several more commercials before he was cast in his next feature film, All Over the Guy (2001), where he played a young Tom (Richard Ruccolo), and later in Drillbit Taylor (2008).

== Music education and career ==
Garza completed an interdisciplinary undergraduate music degree at UCSD in 2011. Upon graduation, he collaborated with the Museum of Making Music—a division of the NAMM Foundation—on its exhibition "The Sound of Sax: How the Saxophone Won America's Soul". The exhibit featured rare and historical saxophones from the collections of Garza and Rob Verdi and ran until January 2013.

Garza's album Low Standards was released in 2012 to accompany the saxophone exhibit and features the E♭ and B♭ tubax and contrabass saxophone. He also performed with the Green and Rebelution on their "Peace of Mind" tour in 2012 and played saxophone on Sly Stone's 2014 singles "One More Hit" and "Role Model".

Garza has been performing with Violent Femmes since 2004 and is featured on their 2015 EP Happy New Year, on bass saxophone and piano, as well as the albums We Can Do Anything (2016), playing contrabass, bass and baritone saxophone, and 2 Mics & the Truth: Unplugged and Unhinged in America (2019), on baritone sax, cabasa and vocals.

While touring with the Violent Femmes as part of the Barenaked Ladies' 2015 "Last Summer On Earth" tour, Garza joined former Men at Work frontman Colin Hay (who was also part of the tour) and Barenaked Ladies in performing "Who Can It Be Now?" every night. One of these performances is featured on the live album BNL Rocks Red Rocks (2016).

Garza also formed trip-hop group Yulan & Blaise with actress Yulan Jack in 2024. Their first single, God Complex, was released on November 22, 2024, alongside a music video. The project announced that they would release an EP in 2025.

== Filmography ==
- Another World (1994–1996)
- Solitude Point (1998)
- All Over the Guy (2001)
- Drillbit Taylor (2008)

== Discography ==
- 2004 – "Genesis Concert" (with Adam Gilberti and the Central Coast Philharmonia)
- 2012 – "Low Standards"
- 2014 – "One More Hit" (single) (with Sly Stone)
- 2014 – "Role Model" (single) (with Sly Stone)
- 2015 – "Happy New Year" (with Violent Femmes)
- 2016 – "We Can Do Anything" (with Violent Femmes)
- 2016 – "BNL Rocks Red Rocks" (with Barenaked Ladies)
- 2017 – "2 Mics & the Truth: Unplugged and Unhinged in America" (with Violent Femmes)
- 2019 – "Hotel Last Resort" (with Violent Femmes)
- 2024 – "God Complex" (single) (with Yulan & Blaise)
- 2025 – "Falling 花火落" (single) (with Yulan & Blaise)
