= Gentlemen & Assassins =

- Origin: Berlin, Germany
- Years active: 2010–2012
- Past members: Elyas Khan, Sxip Shirey, Brian Viglione
- Website: Official Facebook

Gentlemen & Assassins was a New York-based music project, whose members were: composer and guitarist Elyas Khan of Berlin, Sxip Shirey of New York, and Brian Viglione of the Dresden Dolls. They toured in Europe, including a show at Theater Dortmund with Sonic Youth and Dresden Dolls producer Martin Bisi After releasing their first album Mother Says We're Innocent, the group disbanded in 2012.

== Discography ==
=== Albums ===
Albums by Gentlemen & Assassins
Year	Album title	Release details
2012	Mother Says We're Innocent	Released: Sept 1, 2012; Label: Self-released; Format: digital
