= We Can Do Anything =

Studio album by Violent Femmes
- Released: March 4, 2016
- Genre: Rock
- Length: 31:53
- Label: PIAS America

Violent Femmes chronology
Happy New Year (2015)	We Can Do Anything (2016)	2 Mics & the Truth (2017)

We Can Do Anything is the ninth studio album by American band Violent Femmes, released March 4, 2016. It was the band's first full studio album since 2000's Freak Magnet, after releasing four-song EP Happy New Year in 2015. “We Can Do Anything” features Boston-based drummer, Brian Viglione, best known for his work with The Dresden Dolls.

== Artwork ==
The cover artwork is by Barenaked Ladies multi-instrumentalist Kevin Hearn, with whom Violent Femmes toured in 2015.

== Reception ==
Professional ratings
Review scores
Source	Rating
Allmusic	3/5 stars

Consequence of Sound described the album as one that "ebbs and flows, but in the end, it has enough going for it to merit its existence".

== Track listing ==
All tracks are written by Gordon Gano unless otherwise indicated.

No.	Title	Writer(s)	Length
1.	"Memory"		3:03
2.	"I Could Be Anything"		3:42
3.	"Issues"	Gano, Kevin Griffin, Sam Hollander	3:05
4.	"Holy Ghost"	Gano, Hollander, Dave Katz	2:35
5.	"What You Really Mean"	Cynthia Gayneau	3:51
6.	"Foothills"	Gano, Hollander, Katz	2:43
7.	"Traveling Solves Everything"		2:58
8.	"Big Car"		2:55
9.	"Untrue Love"		3:16
10.	"I'm Not Done"		2:12

== Personnel ==
Violent Femmes

- Gordon Gano – lead vocals, guitars, violin, banjo
- Brian Ritchie – acoustic bass guitar, vocals
- Brian Viglione – drums, percussion, vocals

The Horns of Dilemma

- John Sparrow – cajón
- Jeff Hamilton – acoustic guitar, mandolin, 6 string banjo, ukulele, vocals, percussion
- Blaise Garza – contrabass, bass, baritone and tenor saxophones
- Kevin Hearn – accordion, acoustic guitar, piano, organ, vocals
- Paul Cebar – electric 12-string guitar

Technical

- Jeff Hamilton – production
- Chris Gehringer – mastering
- John Agnello – mixing
- Kevin Arndt – engineering
- Martin Bisi – engineering
- Warren A. Bruleigh – production assistance

Artwork

- Antoine Moonen – design
- Kevin Hearn – cover art
- Herman Asph – photography

== Charts ==
Chart (2016)	Peak position
Australian Albums (ARIA)	59
Belgian Albums (Ultratop Flanders)	153
Belgian Albums (Ultratop Wallonia)	147
US Billboard 200	184
