= Happy New Year (Violent Femmes EP) =

EP by Violent Femmes
- Released: April 18, 2015
- Recorded: December 31, 2014
- Genre: Rock
- Label: Add It Up Productions
- Producer: Chris Townsend

Violent Femmes chronology
Archive Series No. 2: Live in Chicago Q101 (2006)	Happy New Year (2015)	We Can Do Anything (2016)

Happy New Year is an EP released by the Violent Femmes for Record Store Day on April 18, 2015. It was the first recording of original songs by the band in 15 years. The EP was released on 12-inch, 180-gram, champagne-colored vinyl, and later made available for digital download on June 2, 2015

== Track listing ==
All tracks are written by Gordon Gano unless otherwise indicated.

Side A
No.	Title	Length
1.	"Happy New Year Next Year"	01:39
2.	"Love Love Love Love Love" (Jake Brebes)	03:43

Side B
No.	Title	Length
1.	"Good for/at Nothing"	03:05
2.	"Fast Horses"	04:37

== Personnel ==
- Gordon Gano – vocals, guitar
- Brian Ritchie – acoustic bass guitar, vocals
- Brian Viglione – snare drum, tranceaphone, percussion, vocals
- John Sparrow – Cajon
- Jeff Hamilton – Dobro, mandolin, ukulele, cabasa, vocals
- Blaise Garza – Bass saxophone, piano
