= Veronica Swift =

American jazz and bebop singer (b. 1994)

- Born: Veronica O'Brien; May 14, 1994 (age 32); Charlottesville, Virginia, U.S.
- Genres: Jazz; bebop; straight-ahead jazz
- Occupation: Singer
- Years active: 2004–present
- Label: Mack Avenue
- Website: www.veronicaswift.com

Veronica O'Brien (born May 14, 1994), known professionally as Veronica Swift, is an American jazz and bebop singer.

== Early life ==
Swift was raised in Charlottesville, Virginia, as part of a family of musicians. Her parents are the late jazz pianist Hod O'Brien and singer Stephanie Nakasian. At the age of nine, she recorded her debut album, Veronica's House of Jazz (2004), featuring Richie Cole playing with her father's rhythm section. She chose the stage name "Veronica Swift" to pay tribute to her father's biological mother, whose last name had been Swift. She began touring with her parents at this time as well. At age eleven, she appeared in the series Women in Jazz at Dizzy's Club Coca-Cola; At the age of 13, she released her second album, It's Great to Be Alive (2007), on which saxophonist Harry Allen also played.

Swift earned her bachelor's degree in jazz voice in 2016 from the University of Miami's Frost School of Music. While there, she composed a goth-rock opera entitled Vera Icon about a homicidal nun. Swift says she "needed an outlet for the anger" she felt at her father's cancer, and needed a more dramatic genre to express the emotion. Her 2015 album, Lonely Woman, includes two songs with her father at the piano and may represent the last recording by Hod O’Brien, who died in 2016. Swift placed second at the 2015 Thelonious Monk Competition. Following graduation, she moved to New York City, where she played Saturday nights at the Birdland jazz club.

== Career ==
She appeared with Chris Botti, Benny Green, and Michael Feinstein. She toured with Wynton Marsalis and the Jazz at Lincoln Center Orchestra. She was involved in ten recording sessions between 2004 and 2019. In 2019, she went on tour with the Benny Green Trio.

She has also sung multiple songs with Postmodern Jukebox, including a cover of Aerosmith's "Rag Doll". Since 2024, she has been performing as part of the hard rock band called DAME.

Bill Milkowski said she has perfect pitch and phrasing.

== Awards and honors ==
- 2019: Best New Artist and Best Vocal Release (for Confessions) in Jazz Times Readers' Poll

== Discography ==
=== As leader ===
- Veronica's House of Jazz (HodStef, 2004)
- It's Great to Be Alive! (HodStef, 2007)
- Lonely Woman (HodStef, 2015)
- Confessions (Mack Avenue, 2019)
- This Bitter Earth (Mack Avenue, 2021)
- Veronica Swift (Mack Avenue, 2023)

=== As guest ===
- Let's Sail Away, Jeff Rupert (Rupe, 2017)
- Then and Now, Benny Green (2018)
- Themes of Romance, James Sarno (2025)
