= Jesus Killing Machine =

Studio album by Voodoocult
- Released: 1994
- Recorded: 1993–1994
- Studio: Temple Studios, Malta, Hot Tin Roof, Los Angeles, Woodhouse, Dortmund, Morrisound, Florida
- Genre: Thrash metal
- Length: 47:43
- Label: Motor Music
- Producer: Waldemar Sorychta

Voodoocult chronology
Jesus Killing Machine (1994)	Voodoocult (1995)

Jesus Killing Machine is the debut album by German heavy metal band Voodoocult, released in February 1994.

== Release ==
The album was issued on CD and vinyl. The vinyl saw an initial limited circulation of 1,000 and was re-released in a package with the single Metallized Kids three months later, this time with limited circulation of 1,500. The Japanese edition was released in January 1995 and contained two bonus tracks. The album features two tracks that had been released on albums of Boa's main band Phillip Boa & The Voodooclub and that are presented in metal style on Jesus Killing Machine.

== Track listing ==
All lyrics are written by Phillip Boa, except where noted.

No.	Title	Music	Length
1.	"Killer Patrol"	Waldemar Sorychta	3:57
2.	"Metallized Kids"	Dave Ball	4:26
3.	"Jesus Killing Machine"	Ball	4:32
4.	"Born Bad and Sliced!"	Sorychta, Dave Lombardo	3:58
5.	"Albert is a Headbanger" (Lyrics by Guido Eickelmann, Pia Lund, Voodoo) (From the 1989 album Hair by Phillip Boa & The Voodooclub)	Boa	3:50
6.	"Hellatio"	Sorychta	3:15
7.	"Death Don't Dance with Me"	Ball, Boa	4:08
8.	"Art Groupie"	Ball	4:53
9.	"Blood Surfer City"	Ball, Mille Petrozza	5:03
10.	"Voodoocult"	Ball, Boa	4:09
11.	"Bitchery Bay"	Ball, Boa	5:32

Japanese edition bonus tracks
No.	Title	Music	Length
12.	"My Game is Dracula" (From the 1994 album God by Phillip Boa & The Voodooclub)	Boa, Ball	4:43
13.	"Ringleader"	Boa, Ball	3:46

== Personnel ==
=== Voodoocult ===
- Phillip Boa – vocals
- Chuck Schuldiner – guitar
- Gabby Abularach – guitar
- Waldemar Sorychta – guitar
- Mille Petrozza – guitar
- Dave Ball – bass
- Dave Lombardo – drums

=== Additional personnel ===
- David Vella – recording
- E.roc – recording, engineering, mixing
- Waldemar Sorychta – production, recording, mixing
- Tom Morris – recording
- Andy Drudy – pilot guitar
- Ulf Hobelt – mastering
- Siggi Bemm – drum editing, technical advice

== Chart positions ==
Chart (1994)	Peak position
German Albums (Offizielle Top 100)	43
