= Voodoocult =

Multinational thrash metal band

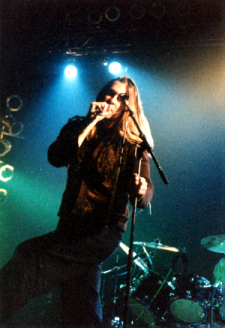
- Phillip Boa with Voodoocult in 1995

Background information
- Origin: Germany
- Genres: Thrash metal
- Years active: 1993–1996
- Labels: Motor Music
- Website: phillipboa.de

Voodoocult was a multinational thrash metal supergroup formed in 1993 by German Phillip Boa, vocalist of the alternative band Phillip Boa & The Voodooclub. The project was especially notable for the reputation of the participating musicians, such as Jim Martin (of Faith No More), Chuck Schuldiner (of Death), Slayer drummer Dave Lombardo, and Mille Petrozza of Kreator. The band released two albums and disbanded in 1996 after the release of the second album and a tour.

== Discography ==
Studio albums

- Jesus Killing Machine (1994)
- Voodoocult (1995)

Singles

- "Killer Patrol" (1994)
- "Metallized Kids" (1994)
- "When You Live as a Boy" (1995)

== Band members ==
Last line-up

- Phillip Boa – vocals
- "Big" Jim Martin – guitars
- Gabby Abularach – guitars
- Dave "Taif" Ball – bass
- Markus Freiwald – drums

Original line-up

- Phillip Boa – vocals
- Chuck Schuldiner – guitars
- Mille Petrozza – guitars
- Waldemar Sorychta – guitars
- Dave "Taif" Ball – bass
- Dave Lombardo – drums
