= Brian Viglione =

American musician (born 1979)

- Viglione in 2008

Background information
- Born: Brian Viglione; May 16, 1979 (age 47)
- Origin: Greenville, New Hampshire, United States
- Genres: Alternative rock; punk cabaret; heavy metal; dark cabaret; industrial; darkwave
- Occupations: Musician; actor; producer
- Instruments: Drums; percussion; bass guitar; guitar; piano; double bass; vocals
- Years active: 1999–present
- Labels: Roadrunner; 8ft.
- Member of: The Dresden Dolls; Dame
- Formerly of: Radiator King; The Cliks; World/Inferno Friendship Society; Scarlet Sails; Botanica; Black Tape For A Blue Girl; H.U.M.A.N.W.I.N.E.; Violent Femmes
- Website: www.brian-viglione.com

Brian Viglione (born May 16, 1979, in Greenville, New Hampshire) is an American drummer best known for his work with The Dresden Dolls and Violent Femmes. For a short time, he was also a member of New York City's cabaret punk orchestra World/Inferno Friendship Society.

Known for his energetic and expressive drumming style, Viglione has often aligned himself with groups who incorporate eclectic musical styles and theatrical elements. A multi-instrumentalist, he plays guitar, bass, percussion, and sings in several of his collaborations, and has produced records.

Viglione relocated from New York to Los Angeles in 2019.

== Career ==
Brian Viglione was introduced to the drums by his father on Christmas Day at age five with his interest quickly deepening at age nine when rock music became a primary focus and passion. A pivotal moment occurred in 1990 when his father brought him to see The Elvin Jones Jazz Machine and he witnessed his first up-close exposure to the drummer who would become his principal inspiration on the instrument. At 16 years old, he began playing gigs in clubs with bands around New England before moving from New Hampshire to Boston in 1999. There, he played with several Boston punk bands on both drums and bass guitar.

=== The Dresden Dolls ===
Viglione in The Dresden Dolls

At a Halloween party in October 2000, Viglione first met Amanda Palmer, and together they formed The Dresden Dolls after their first time playing together. They are a Boston-based keyboard/drum duo.

In addition to playing drums, Viglione also plays guitar and bass on several Dresden Dolls songs including the first single, "Sing", from their 2006 album Yes, Virginia... and sings back-up vocals, most notably on their version of "Pierre" from The Dresden Dolls: Live in Paradise DVD.

After signing with Roadrunner Records in early 2004, the duo re-released their self-titled debut The Dresden Dolls to worldwide acclaim and made their Billboard chart debut with the equally applauded follow-up Yes, Virginia.... In addition, the duo's live audiences continued to grow around the planet as The Dresden Dolls completed sold-out tours on four continents, supported Nine Inch Nails, and performed at prestigious world festivals including Reading, Bonnaroo, Leeds, Coachella, Fuji Rock, Roskilde, Glastonbury, and Download.

Locally, they won numerous awards ranging from multiple Boston Music Awards to topping the Boston Phoenix/FNX Best Music Poll. In 2006, the band recorded their second live DVD chronicling their two sold-out shows at The Roundhouse in London. The concert DVD captures the band with their fan base, many of whom traveled from all over the US, Australia, and Europe to attend in concert at the peak of the band's most active period.

In June 2007 they toured with the True Colors Tour, including his debut at Manhattan's Radio City Music Hall, and his first review in The New York Times.

The Dresden Dolls reunited for a tour in the United States in 2010, starting on Halloween in New York City and ending in San Francisco on New Year's Eve. They performed two shows in 2011, in Australia and Mexico, and seven shows, in Australia and New Zealand, in 2012. They performed shows in Kingston, New York, Boston, and Brooklyn in August 2016. In 2017, they performed a Halloween show in Washington, DC and three shows in November at the Paradise Rock Club in Boston. They announced (May 2018) two reunion shows for Halloween 2018 in the UK.

=== The Onion Cellar ===
In January 2007, Viglione co-starred in the American Repertory Theater's production of The Onion Cellar, in Cambridge, Massachusetts. The show was co-written by The Dresden Dolls, cast, and director, Marcus Stern, loosely based on a chapter from Günter Grass's book The Tin Drum. The band's music was often used in unconventional ways to depict the drama and humor in a call and response with the actors on stage, and Viglione was given a featured drum solo following one actor's moving scene recalling childhood abuse. The entire 40-show run sold out and the production garnered rave reviews.

=== World/Inferno Friendship Society ===
From May 2008 to October 2009, Viglione was the drummer for Brooklyn's punk orchestra World/Inferno Friendship Society, touring 16 countries and recording a new studio album with The Dresden Dolls' production team of Sean Slade, Paul Q. Kolderie, Adam Taylor, and Benny Grotto at Mad Oak Studios in Allston, Massachusetts. He also performed in the band's theatrical production, Addicted To Bad Ideas: Peter Lorre's 20th Century, in the US, Canada, Netherlands, and Finland. Viglione's final performance with the group was a sold-out performance at The Grand Ball Room, NYC, for the annual HALLOWMAS 2009 gala, where amidst a sea of balloons and video projections, hundreds of fans rushed the stage during the encore.

=== Black Tape for a Blue Girl ===
During this period, Viglione also was heavily involved with various side projects and albums, including Black Tape for a Blue Girl's album 10 Neurotics.

Viglione recorded his parts for 12 of the 14 tracks (drums, bass & guitar) in December 2008 and January 2009, at B.C. Studio, owned by Martin Bisi, where the first Dresden Dolls album was recorded. He also co-produced the album. Viglione performed multiple instruments and helped shape the arrangements and sonic direction of the album.

=== Violent Femmes ===
On July 15, 2013, it was announced that Brian joined Violent Femmes as their new drummer.

They released the EP Happy New Year for Record Store Day on April 18, 2015. It was the first recording of original songs by the band in 15 years. The EP was released on 12-inch, 180-gram, champagne-colored vinyl, and later made available for digital download on June 2, 2015.

Viglione went on to record the album We Can Do Anything with Violent Femmes before leaving the band in December 2015.

=== Solo career ===
In addition to his various recording and touring work, he gives drumming workshops to help participants develop personal creativity on the instrument and has lectured at Harvard University, RISD, The Boston Day and Evening Academy, and other schools around the northeastern US.

Viglione played drums on Fighting Naked, the debut album from his childhood friend Holly Brewer's band, H.U.M.A.N.W.I.N.E., released through Warner Music Group's Cordless Recordings. Through March and April 2007, he went on a US national tour to support this release.

Shortly thereafter, he performed drums for the Nine Inch Nails album Ghosts I–IV on a drum kit he built on site out of scrap metal and found objects. "Collaborating with Trent on 'Ghosts' was a great experience and he really allowed it to be a truly creative atmosphere, in having me build a drum kit and allowing me to improvise my drum parts." Around that time, he also wrote, toured, and recorded with various artists including the likes of Jules Shear, Jesse Malin, Martin Bisi, and Franz Nicolay/Major General.

Since January 2009, when not on the road, Viglione has performed with a number of artists and musicians at Dances Of Vice, a monthly Victorian and Jazz Age-themed cabaret in New York City. Past collaborators at Dances of Vice have included Nicki Jaine, Fern Knight, and The Ragwater Review.

On November 8, 2009, an official press release was issued, announcing that Viglione would join up with Toronto-based rock outfit The Cliks for a handful of shows around New England in the fall and winter of 2009. These shows consisted of Viglione on drums, founder Lucas Silveira on guitar and vocals, and bassist Tobi Parks.

In 2010, he recorded with Franz Nicolay and NYC folk singer Anthony da Costa.

On January 29, 2011, he collaborated with pianist Viktoriya Yermolyeva on a live concert (VIGGIE & VIKA: Live in Iceland), where they performed heavy metal covers.

From 2011 to 2013, he toured in Europe with NYC-based punk-cabaret band Botanica. He also played shows with Martin Bisi, The Land of Dreams, and Black Tape for a Blue Girl.

From 2014 through 2016 Viglione collaborated with the German Wave Cabaret act Feline&Strange (female vocals, piano, cello, synths) on three records, LIES, TRUTHS, and OUT.

In March 2015, Brian formed the band Scarlet Sails with Olya Fomina. Scarlet Sails recorded their debut album, Future From The Past, in December 2016, and after a successful Kickstarter campaign, it was released on April 10, 2017.

In 2017, Brian appeared on Radiator King's album A Hollow Triumph After All. In 2019, he appeared on Radiator King's next album, Unborn Ghosts. He has been on several tours as Radiator King's drummer.

== Discography ==
=== With Radiator King ===
- A Hollow Triumph After All (2017)
- Unborn Ghosts (2019)

=== Collaborations ===
- Nine Inch Nails – Ghosts I–IV (2008) (Viglione appears on tracks 19 & 22)
- Franz Nicolay & Major General – Major General (2008)
- Franz Nicolay – St. Sebastian of the Short Stage (2009)
- Martin Bisi – Son of a Gun (2009) (on the song "Mile High-Formaldehyde")
- Black Tape for a Blue Girl – 10 Neurotics (2009)
- Face of the Sun – Face of the Sun (2010)
- Voltaire – Hate Lives in a Small Town (2010
- Voltaire – Riding a Black Unicorn Down the Side of an Erupting Volcano While Drinking from a Chalice Filled with the Laughter of Small Children! (2011)
- Phillip Boa and the Voodooclub – Loyalty (2012)
- Gentlemen & Assassins – Mother Says We're Innocent (2012)
- Morning Glory – War Psalms (2014)
- Violent Femmes – Happy New Year (2015)
- Feline and Strange – LIES (2015)
- Feline and Strange – TRUTHS (2015)
- Feline and Strange – OUT (2015)
- Morning Glory – Post War Psalms (2016)
- Luis Mojica – Wholesome (2016)
- Violent Femmes – We Can Do Anything (2016)
- Radiator King – A Hollow Triumph After All (2017)
- Scarlet Sails – Future from the Past (2017)
- Martin Bisi – BC35 Vol. 1 & Vol 2 (2019)
- Barfbag – Let's Stop a War (2020)
- Amanda Palmer – Forty-Five Degrees - A Bushfire Charity Flash Record (2020) (with various artists)

== Bibliography ==
- Palmer, Amanda; Brian Viglione (2008). The Dresden Dolls – The Virginia Companion. Cherry Lane Music Company. ISBN 978-1-60378-079-7.

== See also ==
- The Art of Asking: How I Learned to Stop Worrying and Let People Help
- Dark cabaret and List of dark cabaret artists
