= Grachtenfestival =

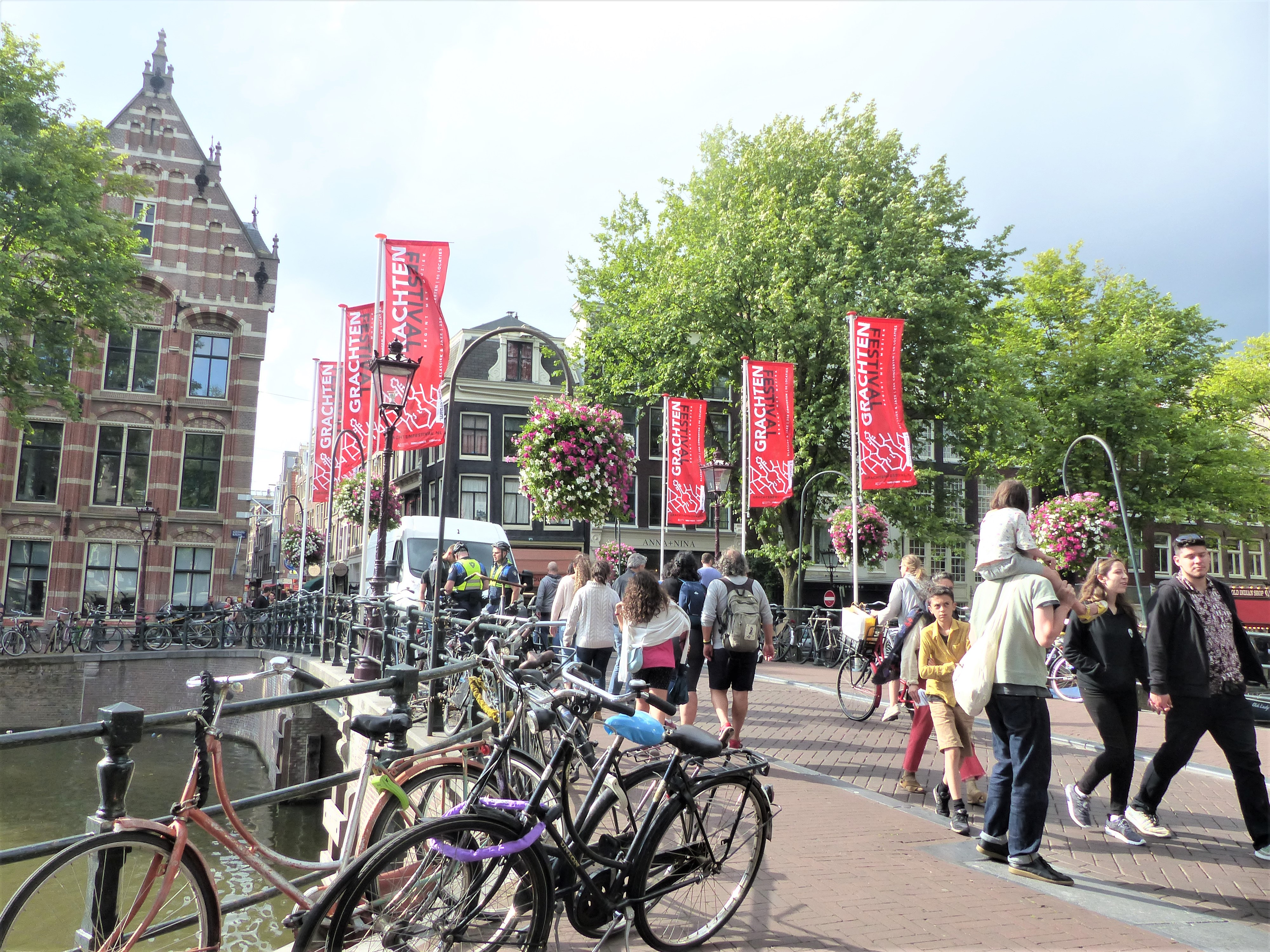
Grachtenfestival (2018)

Grachtenfestival is a 10-day classical music festival on Amsterdam's canals. It includes more than 150 musical performances from barges, architectural tours, and performances from the Royal Concertgebouw Orchestra.
