= Museum Night =

Museum Night may refer to:

- Long Night of Museums, an event where multiple museums and other institutions cooperate to stay open long into the night to gain new patrons

It may also refer to specific events:

- Museum Night (Croatia)
- Museum Night (Flanders and the Netherlands)
- Museums at Night (UK)
- Night of museums and galleries (Plovdiv), in Bulgaria
