= Light Night =

Annual cultural event in England

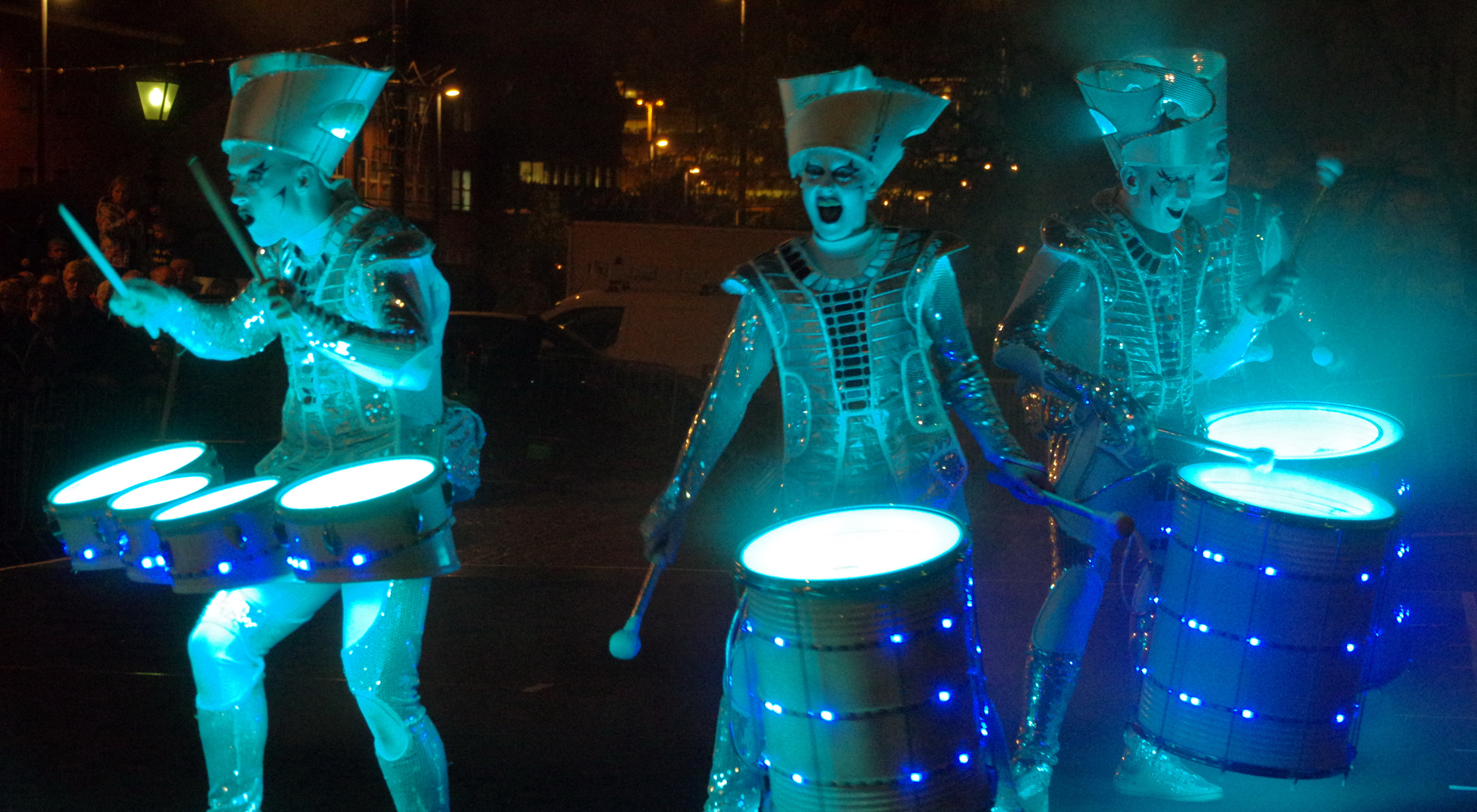
Performers at the 2016 Leeds festival

Light Night is an annual cultural event which first happened in the city of Leeds in October 2005, as part of the launch of the region-wide Illuminate Cultural Festival.

Based on the European model of Nuit Blanche, founded in Paris in 2002, the idea of Light Night is to open cultural and other venues across the city late into the night and play host to unusual cultural events. In October 2005, performances included a string quartet playing at the top of the Town Hall clocktower, a tour round a pitch black church with only a torch and a sinister audio-guide that could not be trusted, and a treasure hunt from the Institute for Crazy Dancing. The hunt involved 200 audience members being led across the city and becoming a show in their own right, collecting white boiler suits and umbrellas en route, and dancing up and down Briggate, the main shopping street, with three shire horses, an ice cream van and the bagpipes of Leeds Pipe Band.

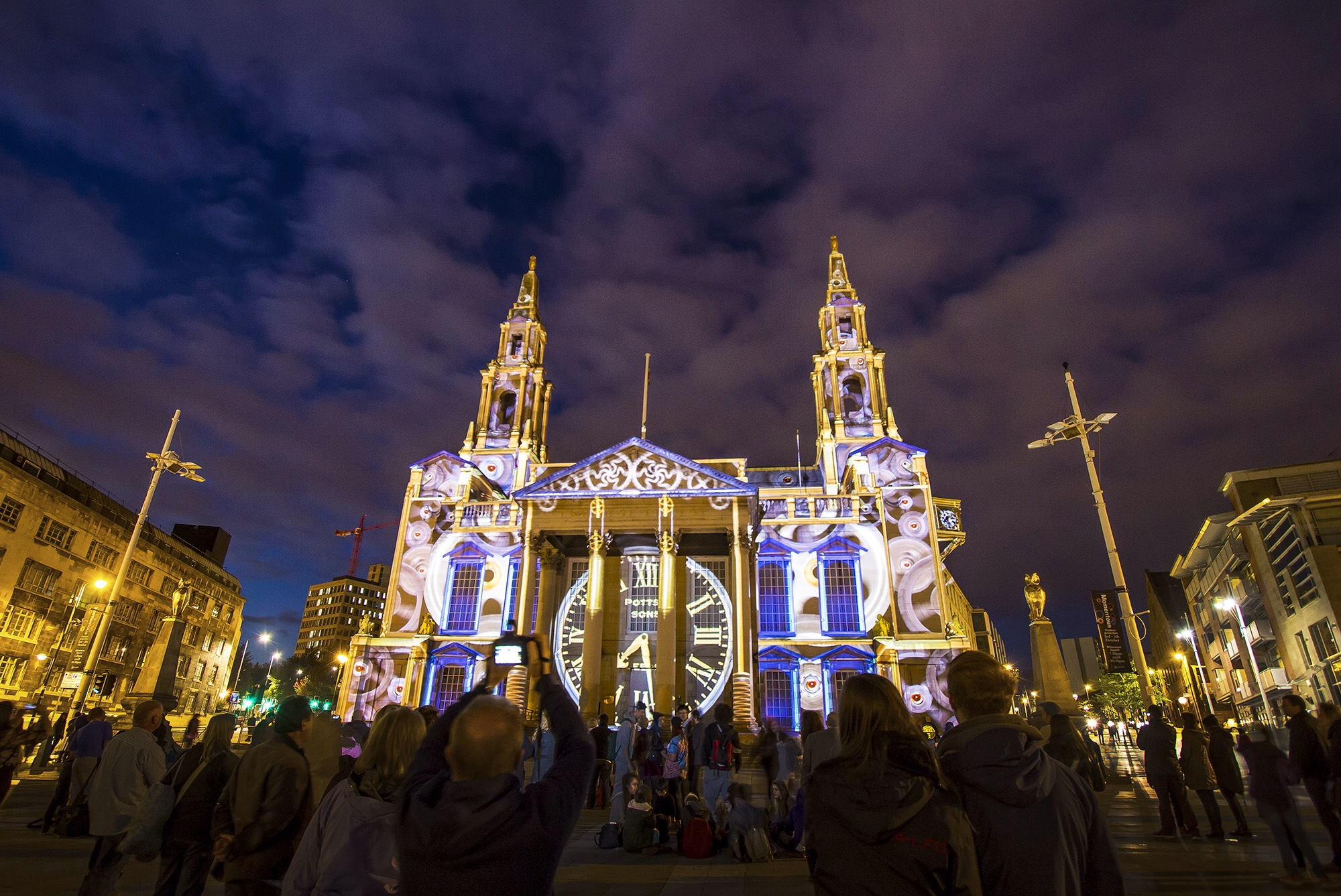
A clock projected onto Leeds Civic Hall on as part of Light Night 2013

Nuit Blanche is a growing global trend which since 2005 Leeds has been leading in the United Kingdom. Leeds was joined by Bradford, Sheffield, York and Hull for Light Night 2006. Several other major cities across the country such as Birmingham hosted Light Night events in 2008. In 2009 it included Belfast, Liverpool and Nottingham.

== See also ==
- Nuit Blanche
- Long Night of Museums
- Museums at Night (UK)
