= Virada Cultural =

Cultural festival in São Paulo, Brasil

Virada Cultural Paulistana is the biggest 24-hour festival in the world, that began in 2005 and occurs annually (usually during the month of May) in the city of São Paulo, Brazil. Events at the Virada Cultural include various live music concerts, films, plays, art exhibits, and other cultural activities and performances. In 2019, has a public expectation of 5 million people and will be the biggest edition of the festival ever held. The event will contain more than 250 event venues, and will feature more than 1200 confirmed attractions.

Since 2007, an increasing number of cities throughout the state of São Paulo have hosted their own events under the name Virada Cultural Paulista. All of the activities in the state of São Paulo, including those in the capital, are sponsored by the state Secretary of Culture (Portuguese: Secretaria de Cultura) and attract hundreds of thousands of visitors.

== History ==
The Virada Cultural was inspired by the White Night festivals, like Paris's Nuit Blanche, which are held in a number of cities throughout the world.

== Timeline ==
- 19–20 November 2005 — An investment of R$600 million.
- 20–21 May 2006
- 5–6 May 2007
- 26–27 April 2008
- 2–3 May 2009
- 15–16 May 2010
- 16–17 April 2011
- 5–6 May 2012
- 18–19 May 2013
- 17–18 May 2014 — Tenth anniversary of the Virada Cultural
- 16–17 May 2015

== Virada Cultural Paulista ==
The first Virada Cultural Paulista was held on 19–20 May 2007 in ten cities across the state of São Paulo: Araraquara, Araçatuba, Ribeirão Preto, Sorocaba, São José dos Campos, São José do Rio Preto, Presidente Prudente, Santos, São Paulo, Campinas, and Bauru.

- 19–20 May 2012, the sixth annual Virada Cultural Paulista was held in 27 cities.
- 25–26 May 2013, the seventh was held in 26 cities.

By 2014, the statewide event had grown to include events in 31 municipalities over the course of two weekends (24–25 May and 31 May–1 June 2014) with a combined total estimated attendance of 1.4 million people.

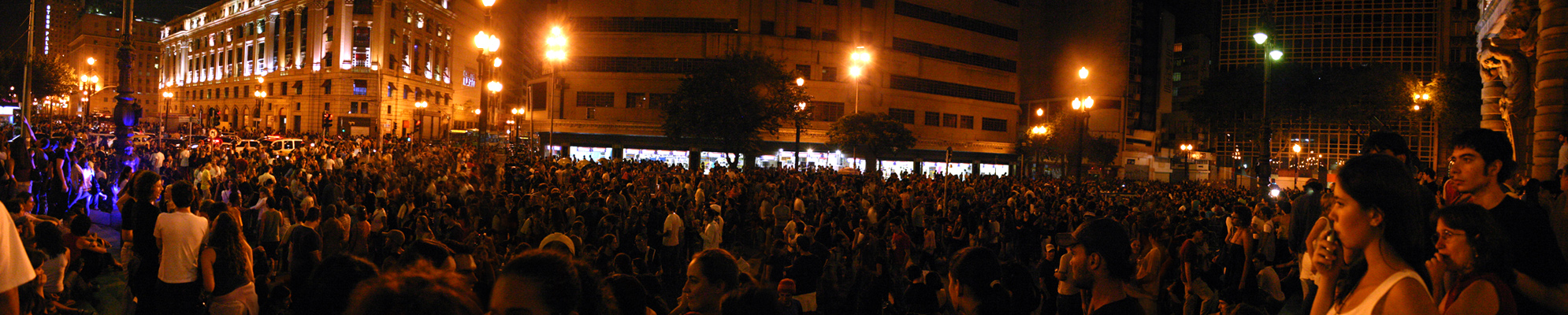
Virada Cultural in 2007 near the Theatro Municipal
