= White Night festivals =

All-night arts festivals held in many cities worldwide in the summer

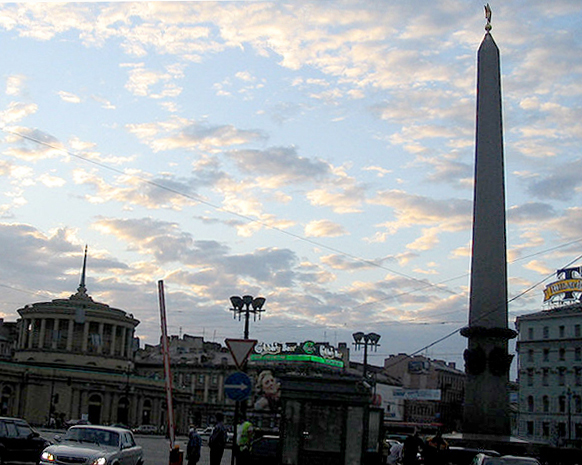
Ploshchad Vosstaniya in Saint Petersburg 28 June 2006 at 11 p.m., demonstrating the degree of sunlight present during White Nights

The White Nights are all-night arts festivals held in many cities in the summer. The original festival is the White Nights Festival held in Saint Petersburg, Russia. The white nights is the name given in areas of high latitude to the weeks around the summer solstice in June during which sunsets are late, sunrises are early and darkness is never complete. In Saint Petersburg, the Sun does not set until after 10 p.m., and the twilight lasts almost all night.

The White Nights Festival in Saint Petersburg is famous for fireworks and Scarlet Sails, a show celebrating the end of school year. Other festivals following this lead have arisen using names such as White Night, Light Nights or Nuit Blanche which may be held in the winter as opposed to the summer.

== Nomenclature ==
Some cities use the French phrase Nuit blanche (or Nuits blanches, if the event is spread over more than one night). Some use the same words in their language: White Nights, Noite Branca (Portuguese), La Notte Bianca (Italian), La Noche en Blanco (Spanish), Noaptea alba (Romanian), Nata e Bardhe (Albanian), Baltā Nakts in Latvian. Others invent their own names, such as Lejl Imdawwal ("Lit Night") in Maltese, Virada Cultural in São Paulo, Taiteiden yö ("Night of the arts") in Finland, and Kulturnatten ("Night of Culture") in Copenhagen.

== Worldwide ==
=== Europe ===
==== Britain ====
The British festivals are called Light night and began in Leeds, England in 2005 as part of the launch of the region-wide Illuminate Cultural Festival. In Leeds in October 2005, these 'unusual cultural events' included a string quartet playing at the top of the Town Hall clock tower, a tour round a pitch black church with only a torch and a sinister audio-guide that could not be trusted, and a 'Treasure Hunt' from the Institute for Crazy Dancing. The Treasure Hunt involved 200 audience members being led across the city and becoming a show in their own right, collecting white boiler suits and umbrellas en route, and dancing up and down Briggate, the main shopping street, with three shire horses, an ice cream van and the bagpipes of Leeds Pipe Band.

Leeds was joined by Bradford, Sheffield, York and Hull for Light Night 2006. Several other major cities across the country including Birmingham hosted Light Night events in 2008. This has spread even further in 2009 and includes Belfast, Liverpool and Nottingham. Brighton and Hove launched an official partner event 'White Night' in 2008. Produced by Brighton and Hove Arts Commission, the event is partnered with the annual event in Amiens and sees the cities' arts venues, theatres, galleries and outdoor spaces play host to a wide selection of arts activities, shows, installations, tours and trails. In 2009, a British network of Light Night towns and cities was established.

==== Finland ====
In Finland a Night of the Arts (Finnish: Taiteiden yö, Swedish: Konstens natt) is an annual event held in several major cities in late August. First Night of the Arts was held in 1989 in Helsinki.

==== France ====
Paris has had its famous Nuit Blanche festival since 2001, when it was started by mayor Bertrand Delanoë.

==== Iceland ====
The summer solstice in Iceland is celebrated on the 24th of June, on the day of St. John the Baptist, when only three hours of modest darkness are experienced in the region of Reykjavík. It is called Jónsmessa, and it is celebrated in small groups of family or friends around bonfires. It is however not as popular as it was before, and most people don't take any part of it, although some people hold on to it. Icelandic folk stories say that on this day all of nature is thought to work in an unusual way, with rocks and herbs gaining magical powers, cows gaining the ability to speak, seals take on human form, and elves emerge from the netherworld.

==== Italy ====
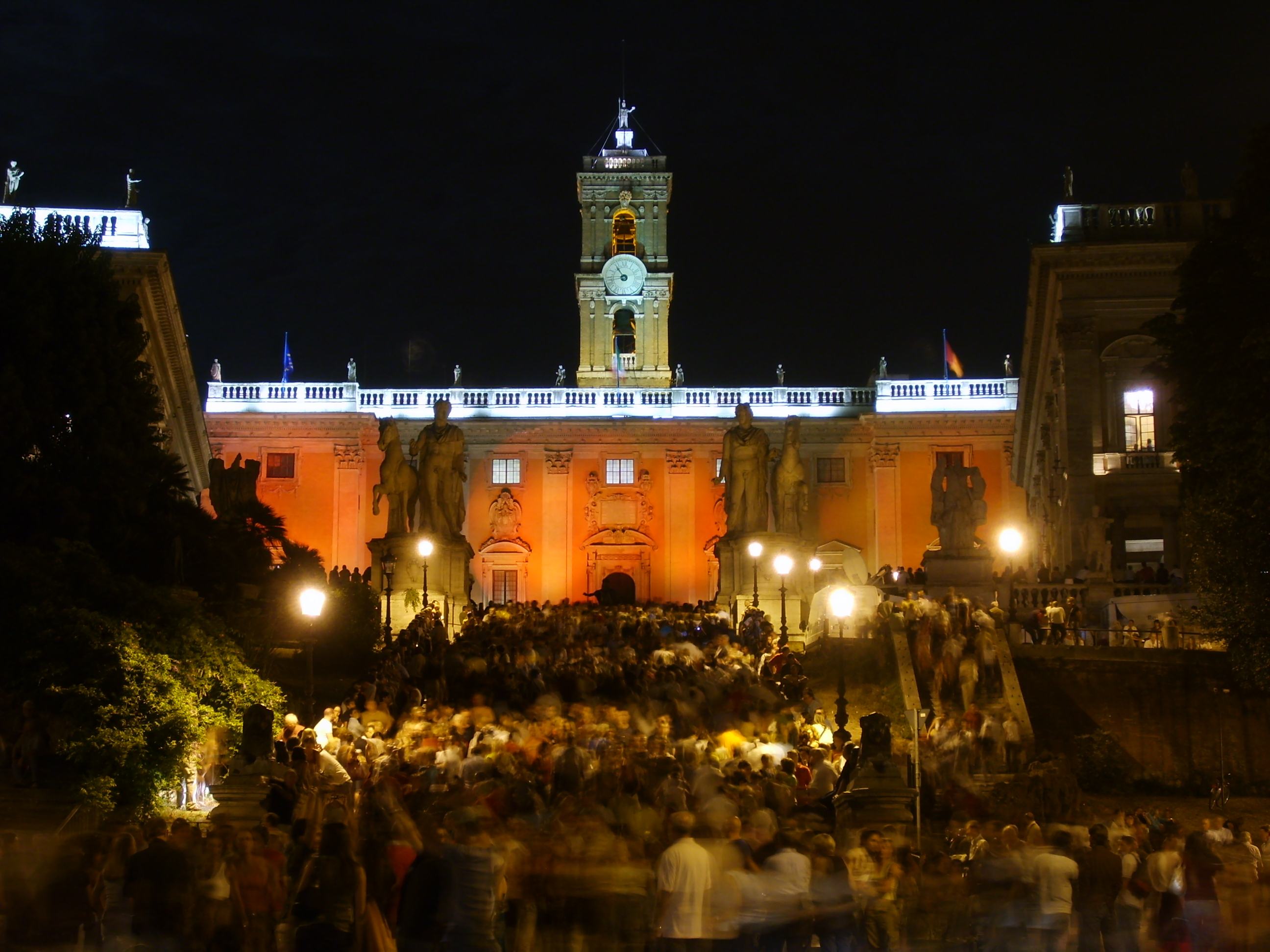
The crowded steps of the Campidoglio in Rome during the 2006 Nuit Blanche

In 2005, Rome's Notte Bianca (English: White Night) was held in mid-September, and the guest star was Roberto Benigni. There were similar initiatives in other cities as well. In Naples it first took place at the end of October 2005 with numerous concerts (Baglioni, Pino Daniele, 99 Posse, Almamegretta, Stadio) and theatrical and cultural events. The attendance was twice the population of Naples itself. Other Italian Notti Bianche took place in Genoa, Turin, Reggio Calabria, Catanzaro and Pescara.

==== Malta ====
2006 also saw the first Notte Bianca (White Night) in Malta, in the capital city of Valletta. Later on this was given a name in Maltese, Lejl Imdawwal (Lit Night) Throughout the fortified city, shops remained open. The Co-Cathedral of St. John was open for display.

==== Slovakia ====
Košice

The weekend at the break of September and October brings two big events to Košice, including international multi-genre festival White Night. The event focusing mainly on modern visual art – brought outside the traditional venues and into the streets of the eastern-Slovak metropolis.

=== Australia and Oceania ===
==== Ballarat ====
Following on from the success of the neighbouring White Night Melbourne, the regional Victorian city of Ballarat held its inaugural White Night festival on March 4, 2017. This marked the first time that a White Night event took place in Regional Australia, and is one of the first White Nights to take place in a regional city globe-wide. The festival attracted an estimated 40,000 people. Program highlights included Carla O'Brien's "Neon Angel Wings", "More than 1 Nation", a projection art project featuring indigenous art on the former Bank of NSW building and the giant-scale puppet The White Night Messenger (by Melbourne-based team A Blanck Canvas) who swaggered through the streets sharing his message of love and compassion and Luke Parker's "Ballarat from above" Drone photography showcase White Night Ballarat runs from 7pm to 7am.

==== Melbourne ====
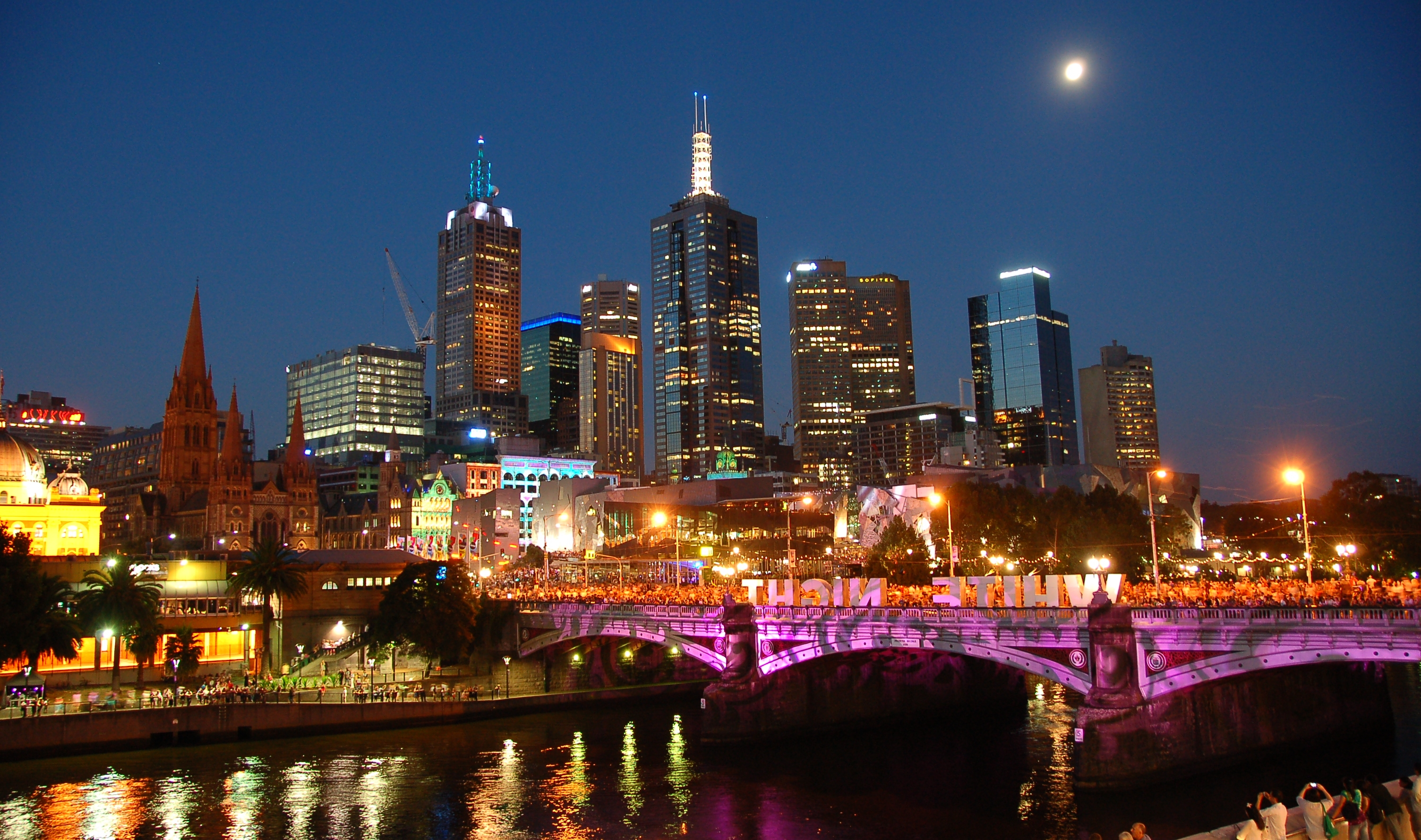
White Night Melbourne (2013)

Melbourne, Australia, held its inaugural White Night festival on 23 February 2013. An estimated crowd of more than 300,000 people attended. The second, on 22 February 2014 drew an estimated 500,000 people. The third White Night in 2015, expanded the festival to more venues and locations, including Scots' Church where digital artist Alinta Krauth debuted her Colonise 3-D projection artwork exploring Australia's relationship with bats, and again in 2016 with her Cartology Apology, called one of the "gems of the night". Open from 7pm to 7am the following morning, the event featured music, dance, visual display, light show, and a variety of buskers. Art institutions such as the National Gallery of Victoria and the Australian Centre for the Moving Image featured free exhibitions and films for the public to attend. The fourth White Night, held on 20 February 2016 attracted an estimated 580,000 people. The 2017 event took place on 18 February whilst the 2018 event took place on the 17 February and attracted more than 600,000 people.

=== Asia ===
==== Seoul ====
The capital of South Korea threw its first nocturnal cultural festival, Seoul Open Night, in August that year, estimating a draw of about 100,000 citizens at six downtown districts.

==== Tel Aviv ====
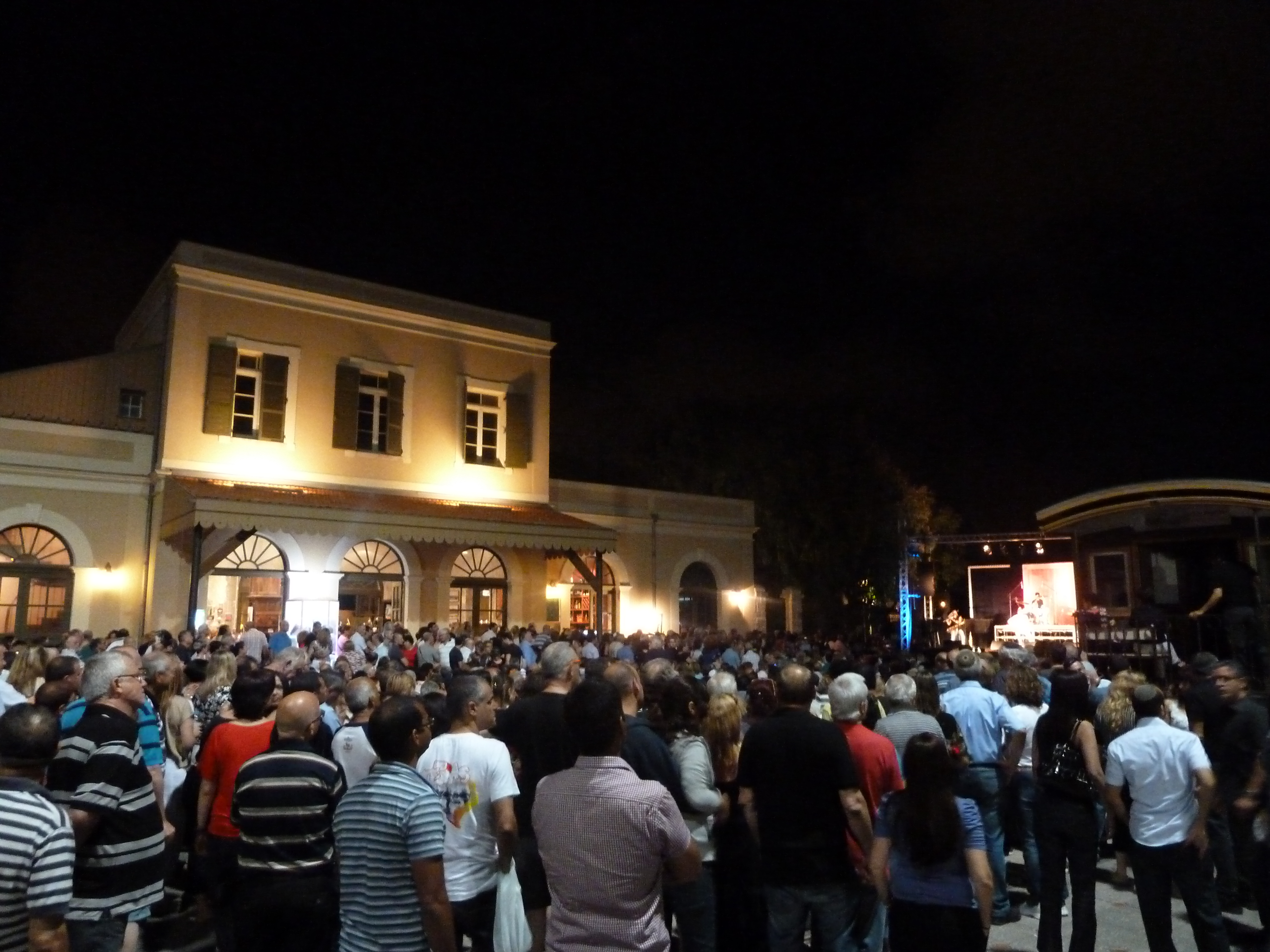
Jaffa Railway Station on Tel Aviv's White Night, 2011

Tel Aviv's first Layla Lavan (Hebrew for "White Night") festival was held in 2003, to mark UNESCO's awarding of World Heritage status to the White City, Tel Aviv's internationally renowned collection of over 4,000 Bauhaus or International-style buildings constructed in the 1930s by German Jewish architects who immigrated to the British Mandate of Palestine after the rise of the Nazis. A White Nights Festival seemed an appropriate way to celebrate the White City. Tel Aviv's reputation as a party city made the festival an annual event, and municipal ordinances now allow businesses to remain open all night on the last Thursday in June.

=== North America ===
==== Calgary ====
September 15, 2012 saw the inaugural Nuit Blanche take place in the western Canadian city of Calgary, Alberta. It was held in the downtown Olympic Plaza (Calgary). Based on the Toronto and Montreal models of the festival, and emphasizing the emergence of a prominent arts and cultural community in the city, the event drew over 10,000 visitors on limited resources. The 2012 edition featured 5 time-based performance art events. In 2014, the city's second Nuit Blanche Calgary took place on September 20, and featured 12 national and international artists showcasing various performance art events and creative installations.

==== Chicago ====
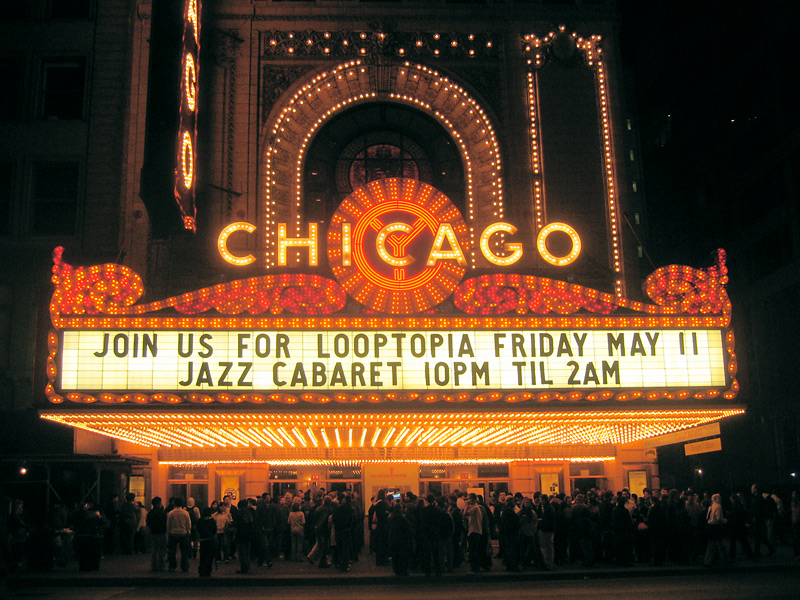
Chicago Theater on Looptopia in 2007

Held in 2007 and 2008, Looptopia was the first event of its type held in the United States. Looptopia was a dusk-to-dawn cultural event that was held in 2007 and 2008 in the city of Chicago. Billed as "Chicago's White Night", Looptopia was modeled after Nuit Blanche held annually in Paris. It premiered on the evening of May 11 through the morning May 12, 2007 in Chicago's central business district, the Loop. A wide range of entertainment was offered in public spaces, while many universities, museums, restaurants, parks and tourist attractions in the loop remained open throughout the night or offered extended hours. It was the first event of its type held in Chicago or the United States. The 2007 event drew an estimated 200,000 attendees, twice the number that organizers expected, which led to logistical problems like lack of sanitation facilities.

==== Halifax ====
The inaugural Nocturne Festival took place in Halifax, Nova Scotia in 2008. It has since been held every year on the first Saturday after Canadian Thanksgiving. The festival is centred on Downtown Halifax and Spring Garden but also extends to the nearby North End and Downtown Dartmouth. Numerous institutions and venues participate, including NSCAD University, The Khyber, Dalhousie University, the Art Gallery of Nova Scotia, the Halifax Central Library, as well as private galleries and businesses. More than 65,000 people attended Nocturne in 2024 compared with 25,000 attended in 2014.

==== Montreal ====
Started in 2003, Montreal was the first Canadian city to adopt the Nuit blanche concept. The event is the finale of the week-long Montreal High Lights Festival.

==== San Antonio ====
Luminaria is San Antonio's adaptation of “White Nights”, originally conceived in Paris, France in 2002, in an attempt to bring contemporary art to the masses in public spaces. “White Nights” is a 12-hour event with a goal of making contemporary art accessible to large audiences, while inspiring dialogue and engaging the public to examine its significance and impact on public space. It is a free event that encourages celebration and community engagement.

==== Santa Monica ====
Santa Monica, California, hosted its first biannual all-night festival under the name of Glow, inspired by Nuit Blanche, on July 19 on the famous Santa Monica Pier, on the beach north and south of the Pier and in the nearby Palisades Park.

==== Toronto ====
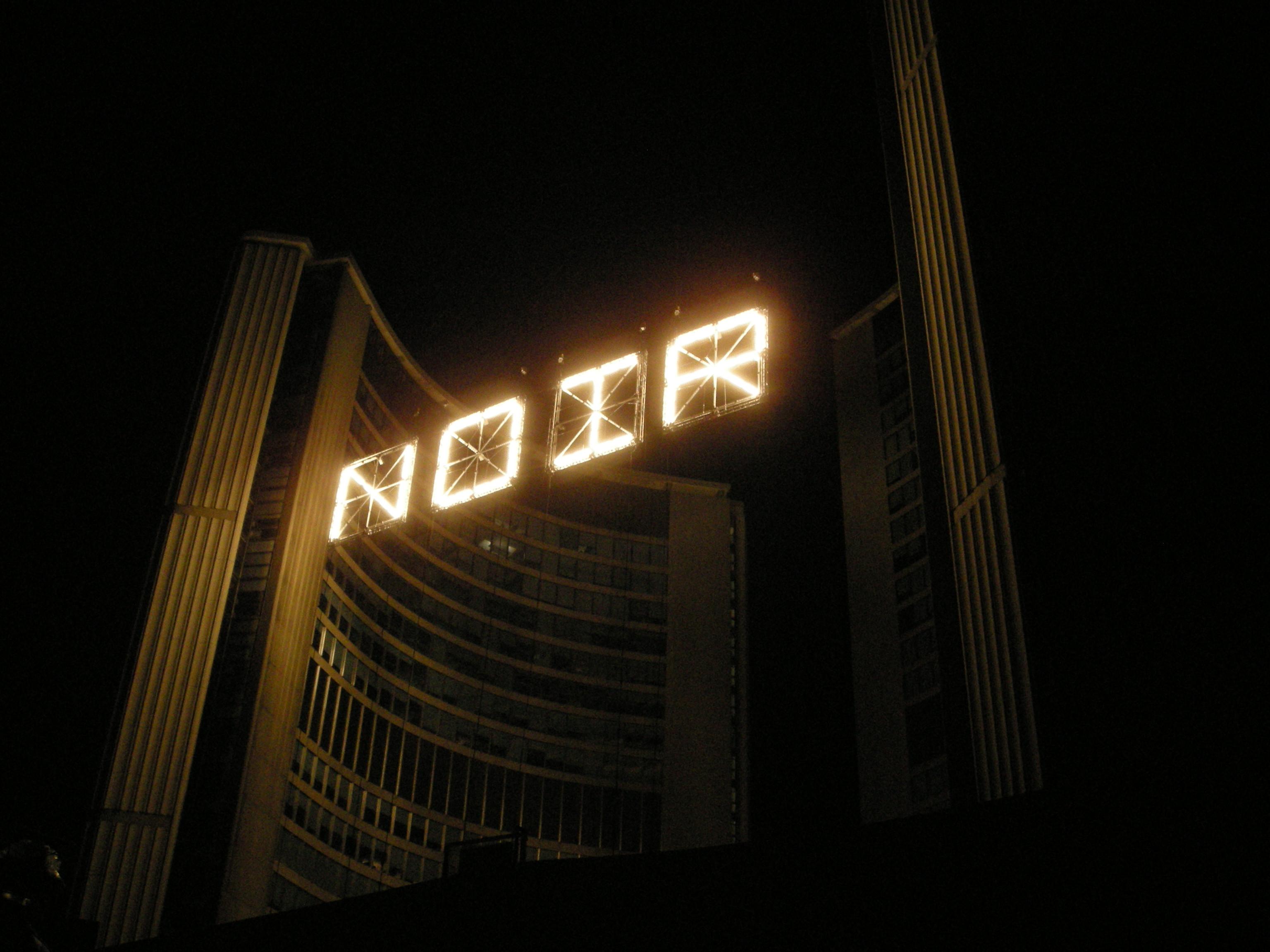
"4 Letter Word Machine" (D. A. Therrien) - Light installation

In 2006, Nuit Blanche was launched in Toronto, Ontario, Canada. Christophe Girard, Deputy Mayor of Paris, who instituted the Parisian Nuit Blanche in 2002, traveled there to help launch the event, praising its citizens for their love of "the magic and the mysteries of the night". Attendance at this inaugural event was estimated by Toronto City Hall to have been 425,000 people; the following year almost doubled that, attracting 800,000 revelers.

=== South America ===
==== Lima ====
In 2008, Lima hosted a Noche en Blanco in mid-May, within the framework of cultural activities of the fifth Latin America, the Caribbean and the European Union Summit.

== See also ==
- Midnight sun
- Night of the Arts
- Nuit Blanche
- Long Night of Museums
- Museums at Night (UK)
