= The Late Shows =

Cultural event in Tyne & Wear, England

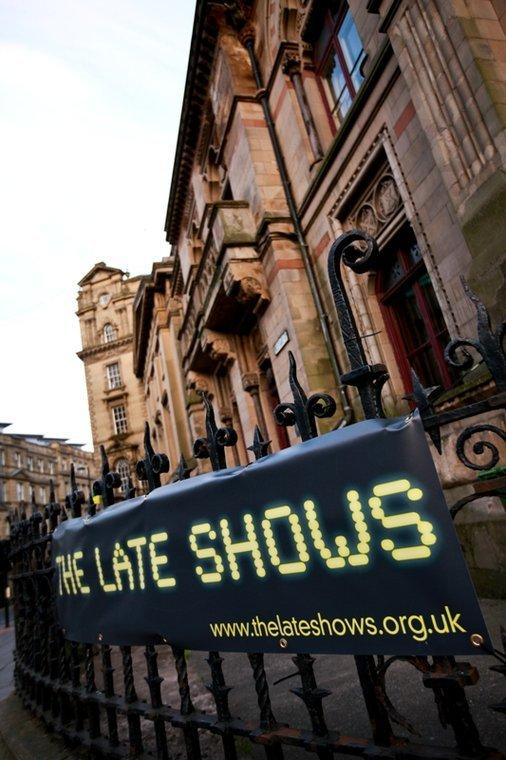
North of England Institute of Mining and Mechanical Engineers exterior with The Late Shows banner foreground, and the Literary and Philosophical Society of Newcastle upon Tyne beyond.

The Late Shows are a one weekend annual cultural initiative developed in Tyne & Wear since 2007. They are intended to attract new audiences to museums and galleries. They have become the largest programme organised in the United Kingdom for the 'Museums at Night Festival'.

== History ==
The programme started as a one-night event with 14 cultural venues taking part including Discovery Museum, Baltic Centre for Contemporary Art and the Laing Art Gallery. All the venues stayed open late and put on free events and exhibitions, which aimed to entice a new, younger audience through their doors. From the outset many different agencies came together to open their doors and this has continued. In mid-May 2013, more than 50 attractions feature in what an arts site for the region described as "the North East's legendary culture crawl". An Arts Council of England case study demonstrates its impact. That report gives headline information thus:

In 2009, 54 events held over two nights across the 29 venues taking part attracted 15,116 visitors. This involved nine commissions, 126 artists and four education sessions. The total audience, including print, broadcast and online was 701,800. The Late Shows 2010 has built on that success with over 19,500 people heading to Newcastle/Gateshead's museums and galleries after-hours.

We supported The Late Shows with £25,000 of National Lottery funding from our Grants for the arts scheme. Support from other partner organisations included £39.974 from Culture 10, £8,703 from North East Regional Museums Hub and £17,990 of support in kind from the participating venues.

In 2013 The Late Shows were a bronze award winner at the North East England Tourism awards.

== Selected notable venues ==
- Laing Art Gallery
- The Biscuit Factory
- Baltic Centre for Contemporary Art
- Victoria Tunnel (Newcastle)
- The Sage Gateshead
- Moorbank Botanic Gardens (now closed)
- Hatton Gallery
- Tyne and Wear Archives Service
- North of England Institute of Mining and Mechanical Engineers
- Literary and Philosophical Society of Newcastle upon Tyne
- Bessie Surtees House

== Selected notable artists ==
- Julia Vogl
- Jenny Holzer
