= Bessie Surtees House =

- Bessie Surtees House on Sandhill, near the River Tyne in Newcastle upon Tyne

- Location in Tyne and Wear

General information
- Location: Tyne and Wear, England, Bessie Surtees House, 41–44 Sandhill, Newcastle-upon-Tyne, NE1 3JF
- Coordinates: 54.9686°N 1.6084°W
- OS grid: NZ249637
- Owner: Historic England

Bessie Surtees House is the name of two merchants' houses on Newcastle's Sandhill, overlooking the River Tyne, that were built in the 16th and 17th centuries. Though commonly referred to solely as Bessie Surtees House, the property actually consists of three distinct properties; Bessie Surtees House, Milbank House, and Maddison House. These names were given to the buildings by their 20th-century owner Lord Gort. The buildings are a fine and rare example of Jacobean domestic architecture. An exhibition detailing the history of the buildings can be found on the first floor. The site is also home to the North East regional branch of Historic England. It is a Grade I listed building.

The earliest record for the house on this site dates from 1465, when the house is recorded as being sold by Robert Rhodes, a local lawyer, to John Belt.

== Bessie Surtees House ==
The house is best known as the scene of the elopement of Bessie Surtees (Elizabeth Scott, Countess of Eldon) and John Scott, who later became Lord Chancellor. The house was divided up and sublet in the 18th and 19th centuries, until it was purchased by John Clayton in 1880, who also purchased the next door Milbank House. It was restored in 1930 by SR Vereker, later Lord Gort, who employed an engineer named R.F. Wilkinson to install 17th-century fixtures taken from properties about to be demolished. Newcastle City Council purchased the house in 1978. They leased it to English Heritage in 1989.

In July 2009 it was targeted by graffiti vandals who extensively spray-painted the roof with the tags "LG", "GRIM" and "KAME".

When Historic England was formed in 2015 it assumed the lease of the property, which it maintains to the present day as its North East of England office. The house is a popular attraction during The Late Shows and Heritage Open Days which take place annually, and allow members of the public to see the areas of the house usually not open to public view.

== Milbank House ==
The brick-fronted Milbank House dates to the same period as Bessie Surtees House, and was also originally timber framed. In 1741 its owner Robert Carrick completed the process of altering its facade to what was at the time a modern Georgian brick frontage. From 1741 until 1757 the building operated as a coffee house.
