= Culture24 =

British charity

- Founded: 2001
- Location: Brighton, England
- Region served: United Kingdom
- Key people: Jane Finnis
- Employees: 10
- Website: culture24.org.uk; museumcrush.org; letsgetrealconference.com
- Formerly called: 24 Hour Museum

Culture24, originally the 24 Hour Museum, is a British charity which publishes websites, Culture24, Museum Crush and Show Me, about visual culture and heritage in the United Kingdom, as well as supplying data and support services to other cultural websites including Engaging Places.

It operates independently, and receives government funding.

== Organisation ==
Culture24 is based in Brighton, southern England, and has ten employees. The Culture24 Director is Jane Finnis, who contributed a chapter to Learning to Live: Museums, young people and education and in March 2010 was named as one of 50 "Women to Watch" in the United Kingdom cultural and creative sectors by the Cultural Leadership Programme. Past Culture24 chairman include John Newbigin, who was named as one of Wired Magazine's top 100 people shaping the digital world in May 2010.

The charity was founded in 2001 as the 24 Hour Museum, when the website of the same name became an independent company.

The organisation changed its name to Culture24 in November 2007, and the website followed suit on 11 February 2009. Culture24 is a registered charity and is funded by the UK government through Arts Council England (ACE).

== Purpose ==
The (now defunct) Museums, Libraries and Archives Council was working with Culture24 as one of its partners in furthering the council's digital agenda, specifically helping to deliver:

More and better quality information on cultural opportunities to the public

A coherent portal for cultural resources for teachers and learners
Greater interaction with individuals and communities through use of Web 2.0 and social networking tools
High quality standards in the management and preservation of digital resources.

Culture24 also administered Museums at Night (UK) between 2010 and 2019, the annual weekend of late openings at museums, galleries and heritage sites.

== Websites ==
The main Culture24 website is a guide to museums, public galleries, libraries, archives, heritage sites and science centres. It has a database of over 5,000 cultural institutions, who are able to update the information about their activities. It features daily arts, museum, history and heritage news, and exhibition reviews. News stories are available as RSS newsfeed.

Culture24 also runs a site for children, Show Me, which has online activities related to UK museums and galleries, including interactive games, quizzes and competitions. A section of the site contains guidance for parents and teachers about using online resources from museums and galleries.

In 2009, Culture24 was runner-up in the Nominet Trust Best Practice Challenge. The Culture24 suite of websites won the 2010 "best of the web" award (long lived category) at the Museums and the Web Conference. Culture24 is also listed as one of the Guardian's top 100 essential websites, and one of the Sunday Times' top 10 museum websites.
