= Julia Vogl =

American sculptor

- Born: Washington, D.C.
- Education: Oberlin College, Slade School of Fine Art
- Known for: Sculpture, Public Art
- Movement: Social sculpture, public art, installation art, urban art
- Awards: Listed by the American for the Arts Year in Review top projects 2011, Audrey Whykeham Prize, Nancy Balfour Trust Scholarship, Aesthetica Creative Works Competition 2012, Catlin Art Prize Winner 2012
- Website: www.juliavogl.com

Julia Vogl is an artist originally from Washington, D.C. who lives and works in London, England. She is a social sculptor, and primarily makes public art. Through a process of community engagement, her works build bright color into existing architectural landmarks, revealing local cultural values.

== Personal life ==
Julia Vogl is the daughter of Frank Vogl, co-founder of Transparency International. She graduated from the Washington International School; earned her BFA at Oberlin College in 2007, and an MFA at Slade School of Fine Art, part of University College London, in 2011. Currently she is a Lecturer and visiting Printmaker at Winchester School of Art, Southampton University, UK. She is a member of the Artists Bond and the Royal Society of Sculptors.

== Works ==
On January 11, 2009, she was funded by The Brooklyn Arts Council to create an installation in Fort Greene Park entitled Leaves of Fort Greene.

While attending the Slade School of Art in London she completed two other major public art works. The first was entitled "Colouring the Invisible," at the School of Slavonic and East European Studies (SEESS). The second was a work entitled "£1 000 000 | 1 000 opinions (where would you allocate £1 000 000 of public spending?)".

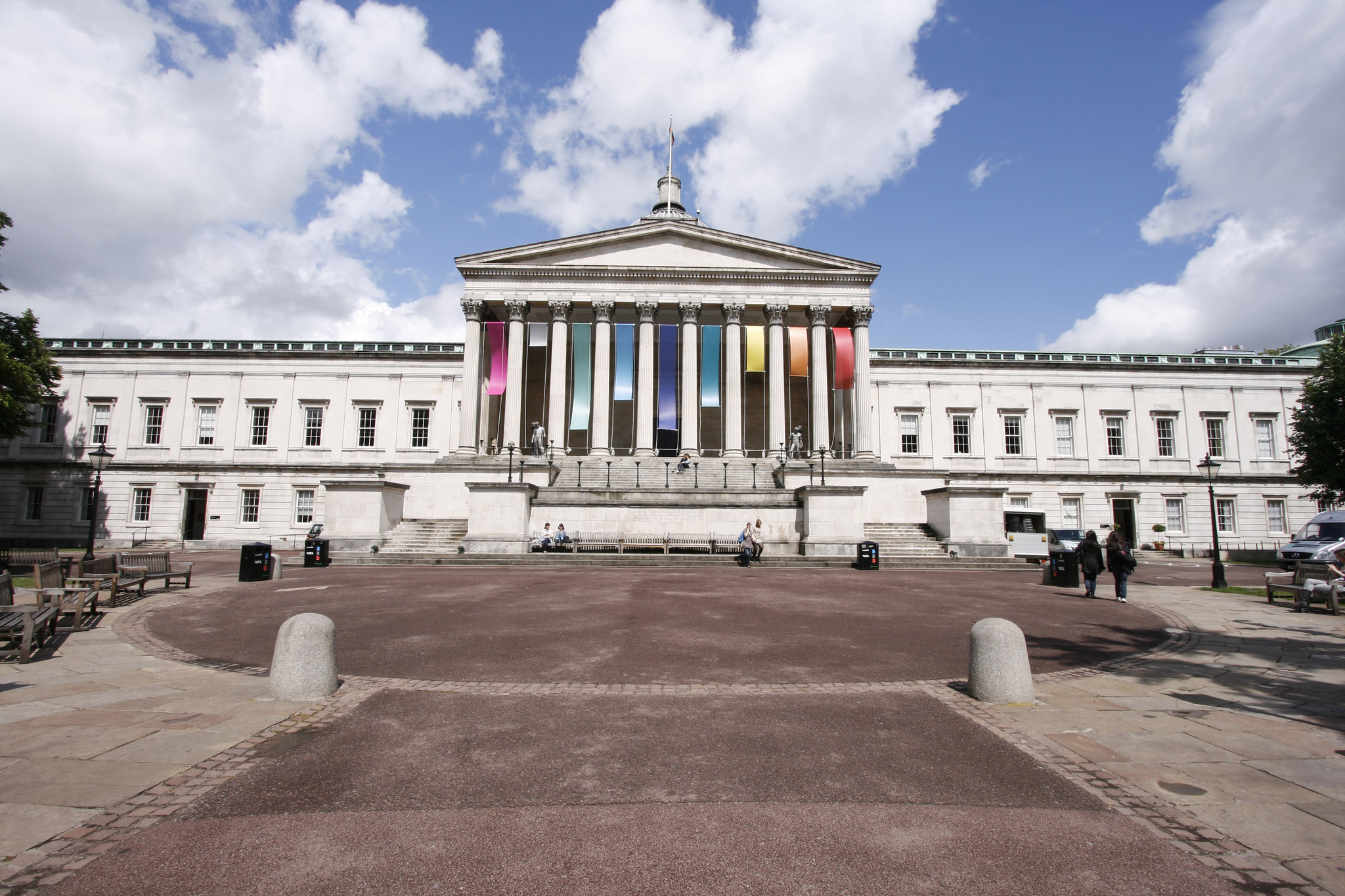
£1 000 000 | 1 000 opinions, by Julia Vogl. Created at University College London, 2011. Made from 1000 individuals' views on where public money should be spent. Included in the Public Art Year in Review 2012 by American for the Arts.

In 2012, Vogl received the Catlin Art Prize. She also received an Arts Council England Grant to make a public art project in Peckham, entitled HOME.

During 2013, Vogl was involved in a participatory artwork at the Discovery Museum Newcastle upon Tyne. The medium of the piece was recycled plastic bottles. Her work in Newcastle was the result of a Museums At Night competition that matched ten contemporary artists with ten museums for the weekend of May 16–18, 2013.

Vogl created an installation called "Tyson's Tiles" in Washington, D.C., 2015. The public artwork consisted of ground murals that incorporated information gathered through community engagement of over a thousand participants. The project aimed to raise awareness of public art.

From 2013 to 2016, Vogl created Social Protest, an interactive book reflecting 457 protests from 8 countries and 31 cities collected in 2013, published via kickstarter in 2016. The book was designed by Michael Lum.

Vogl co-founded the London Brain Project with neuroscientists Louise Weiss, George Pitts and Michelle Downes, in 2013-2018. They facilitated workshops and exhibitions between scientists, artists, and people living with neurological conditions, to break stereotypes of these conditions for the wider public. The conditions included: Epilepsy, Tourettes, Anxiety, Dementia and Brain injury in Childhood.

In 2018, the Jewish Arts Collaborative recruited Vogl to create "Pathways to Freedom," a project that included a process of interviewing people in Boston about the ways that they felt free, as well as a graphical representation of these opinions. Individual participants received custom buttons related to their answers, which also influenced an artwork installed at the Soldiers and Sailors Monument in Boston Common from April 25 to May 14, 2018.

== Public art commissions ==
- 2021-2025: Eve’s Eden

An artwork exploring Eve and Adam and the Garden of Eden. Made in collaboration with Gabriella Willenz funded by the Graduate Theological Union, Jewish Arts Collaborative, American Jewish University- Bruce Geller Memorial Word Prize 2021, and Asylum Arts.

- 2023: Home on the Hill

Royal Borough of Kingston and the Greater London Authority-New Malden Partnership.

- 2022: Smashing Play

Delaware Contemporary Art Center, Wilmington DL Working with community and Children's Art Museum, Wilmington DL

- 2019-2023: Colouring Adult Eczema

Collaboration with artist Peter Hudson and the London School of Hygiene and Tropical Medicine. Supported by Wellcome Trust. Touring sculpture across the UK, Glasgow to Nottingham.

- 2020: Our Neighborhood Rolls

Mural commissioned by the Reher Center for Immigrant Culture and History in Kingston, NY.

- 2019: ITV ident

Sculpture commissioned for ITV, now known as ITVX.

- 2018: LDN WMN Project

Commissioned by the Tate and Greater London Authority celebrating 100 years of suffrage.

- 2018: Scandalous Blue, Who are You?

Commissioned by Hull City of Culture and Humber Street Gallery to celebrate volunteers.

- 2018: Pathways to Freedom

6000 square foot floor mural reflecting views on immigration and freedom in Boston Common, commissioned by, Jewish Arts Collaborative and Boston Common.

- 2017: Leaves

Commissioned by Barts Health NHS Trust and Vital Arts for the Bereavement Suite at Whipps Cross University Hospital.

- 2016: Singing on Paddington Street

Permanent glass sculpture commissioned by, Galliard Homes, O’Shea LTD, Westminster City Council.

- 2015: Tysons Tiles

Temporary 5000 square foot floor mural commissioned by Fairfax Arts Council.

- 2015: Jungle of Concrete

Mural at the Chinese International School, Hong Kong.

- 2014: Plotting Values

Commission with 700 students at Bow School, commissioned by Bow Arts Trust and Clifford Chance.

- 2013: Collect. Select. String. Hoist

Commissioned sculpture by the Newcastle Discovery Museum, Museums at Night Connect 10 initiative.

- 2013: Future Memorial

Permanent sculpture in Bristol's Arnos Vale Cemetery.

- 2012: Home Project

1000 locals' views on home installation, supported by Peckham Square, Arts Council England, and Southwark Council, and Kickstarter
