= Night of the Arts =

Finnish annual event

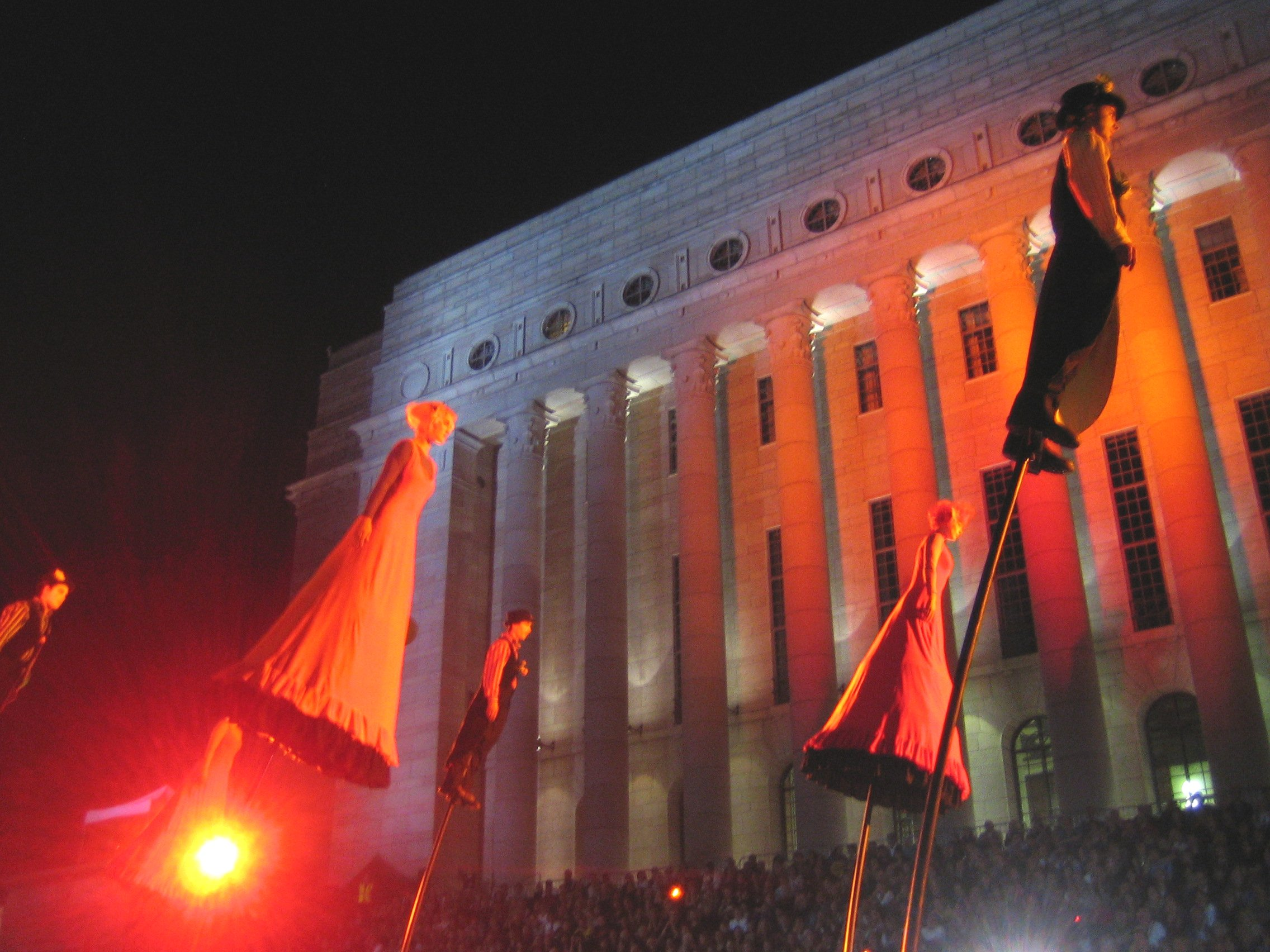
Strange Fruit performing at the Night of the Arts in Helsinki

The Night of the Arts (Finnish: Taiteiden yö, Swedish: Konstens natt) is an annual event held in several major cities in Finland, usually in August. In 2019, it was held inHelsinki, Turku and Oulu on August 15, and in Tampere and Vaasa on August 8. It is one of many White Night festivals held worldwide. In 2019, the festival celebrated its 30th anniversary.

The Night of the arts is an art festival, where art-related events happen in various places all around the city. The events typically begin at around 6 to 8 PM and last at least until midnight, sometimes even to early morning. Events are held in museums, bookstores, public parks and other places.

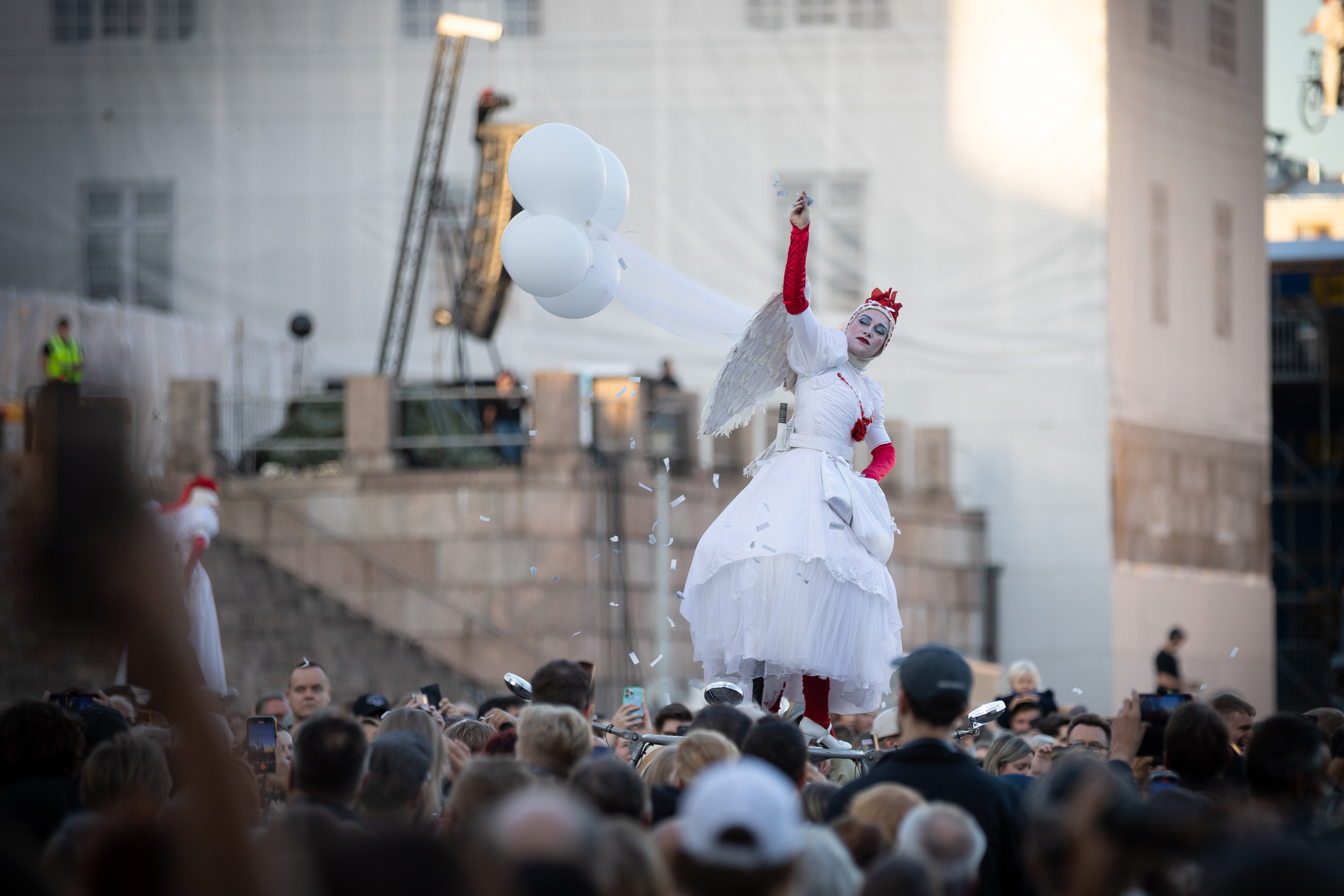
A performing artist spreads confetti in the audience during the main event of Night of the Arts in 2025.

The event has received criticism because of increased use of alcoholic beverages in public late at night. Because of this, a derogatory nickname for the event is the "Night of the bottles" (Pullojen yö).

== Katutaiteiden yö ==
In recent years there has been a sort of a counter-event called Katutaiteiden yö ("Street arts night") that concentrated around graffiti in its different forms. To date, the events have only taken place in Helsinki, whilst in other cities, graffiti happenings are a regular part of the official event.
