= Night of museums and galleries (Plovdiv) =

The Long Night of Museums was first held in Berlin in 1997. Since then a similar format has been adopted all over the continent under different names. Today more than 120 cities in Europe organize their local "Night", an event which has turned into popular cultural events. "The Night of Museums" in Bulgaria was held for the first time on 30 September 2005 in the city of Plovdiv. It is now called Share the Night and is three days of art performances in galleries, cafes, and public spaces all over the town.

== The 'Plovdiv Night’ ==
"The Night of Museums" in Bulgaria was held for the first time on a large scale on 30 September 2005 in the city of Plovdiv thanks to the initiative of Sariev Gallery and the civil committee "Night of Museums and Galleries – Plovdiv". From then on "The Night of Museums and Galleries – Plovdiv" became an emblematic event on a national level offering a program with various events, high attendance, attracting of young audience, positive energy and organization.

== Participants ==
Participants in the main program of the Night of Museums and Galleries include all the currently active state and private museums and galleries. Participants in the concomitant program are cultural institutions, theatres, clubs, book-stores, informal art-spaces, lively urban spots. Events in the projects in the open program are produced by cultural organizations or independent artists and curators. 45 is the total number of locations which participate each year.

== Art ==
Each participant organizes a special program for the event. Visitors are able to observe: art from the cultural heritage, modern and contemporary art from different media, works by local and foreign authors. A big part of the art-events are often highly evaluated by the art-critics. "The Night" around the world as well as in Bulgaria is specific mostly with: projections, concerts, performances, demonstrations, discussions with artists. There is also a program for children – their cultural enrichment and introduction to art.

== Audience ==
Number: For the five editions the number of attendants increased from the record-breaking number of 3000 at the first edition in 2005 to 25 000 at the third in 2007, 15 000 in 2008 and more than 25 000 in 2009. Ages: a wide range of ages – from 18 to 55. The event contributes with the attracting of students, university students and families, who become regular attendants at the event. Social status: young people, artists, business representatives. About 35% of the visitors are guests.
