= Museums at Night =

UK cultural programme

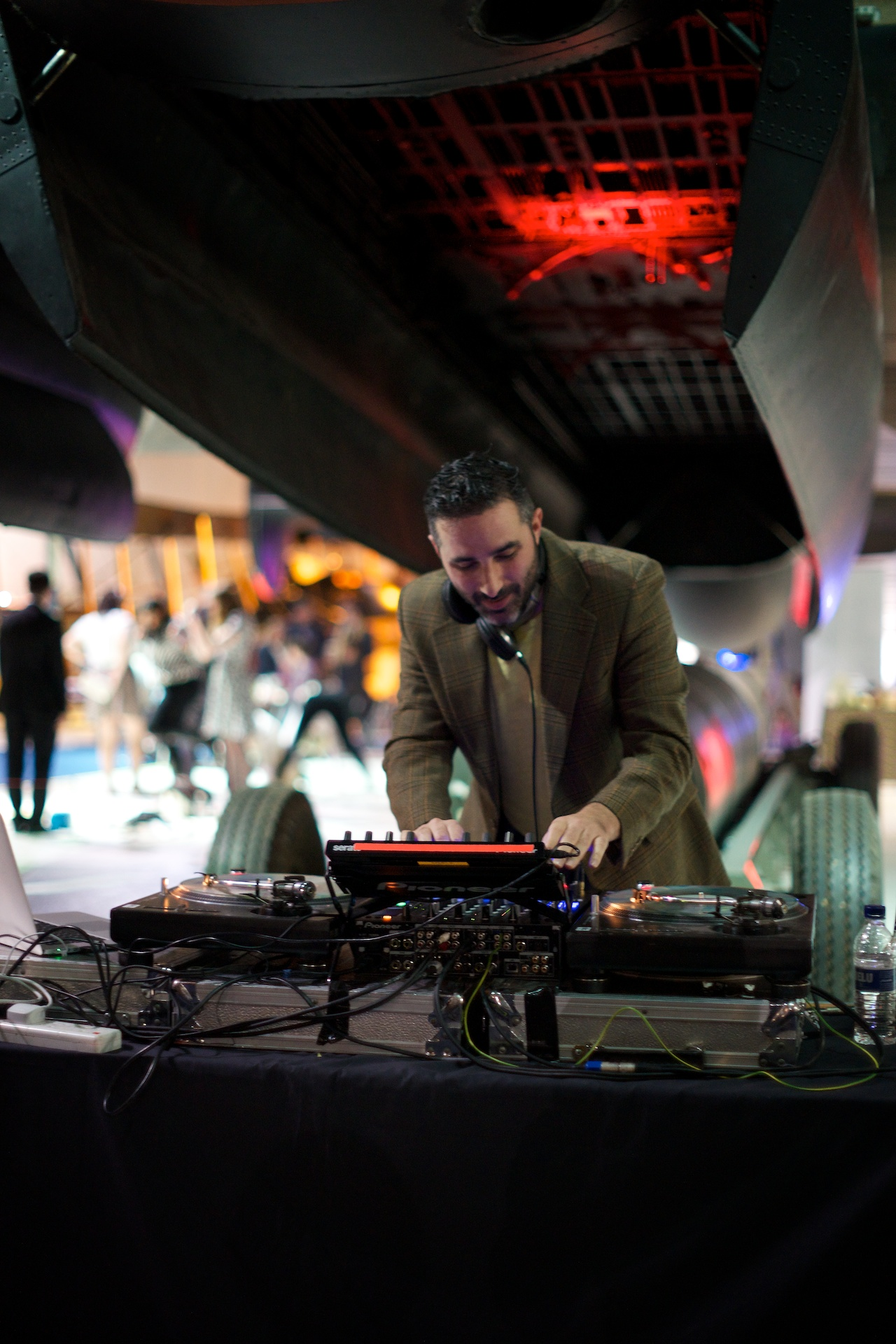
DJ Yoda performing at the Royal Air Force Museum in Hendon as part of a 2014 Museums at Night event

Museums at Night was a twice-yearly festival of late openings, sleepovers and special events taking place in museums, galleries, libraries, archive and heritage sites in the United Kingdom. It was affiliated with the European Night of Museums programme, and took place on weekends in late May (near to International Museum Day) and late October. It ceased operations in January 2020, through lack of funding.

Museums at Night was core funded by Arts Council England and administered by Culture24. For Museums at Night weekend 2009, cultural and heritage venues in the UK staged 157 events, attracting over 34,000 visitors. There were combined cultural and heritage programmes offered by multiple organisations in many United Kingdom towns and cities, including Stockport, Bath, Dorchester, Norwich, Liverpool and NewcastleGateshead. The largest single programme within the festival was that organised in Newcastle Gateshead, covering over 50 venues under the title The Late Shows.

== Participants ==
The "Connect!" competition between museums and other cultural hosting institutions engaged artists to produce art for the festival weekend.

One of the artists who participated in Museums at Night during May 2013 through The Late Shows was Julia Vogl, who created a chandelier with the help of members of the public, using 2500 recycled plastic bottles. Davy and Kristin McGuire participated in Museums at Night in November 2015 with Starkers, bringing the Williamson Art Gallery and Museum's statue Pauline to life, animating her to give her opinions on the visitors to the gallery over the years.

== See also ==
- Light Night
- Nuit Blanche
- Long Night of Museums
