= Reher Center for Immigrant Culture and History =

History museum in Kingston, New York

The Reher Center for Immigrant Culture and History is a history museum in Kingston, New York in a former Jewish bakery. It includes a collection from the Reher family. It is at 101 Broadway in the Rondout–West Strand Historic District. The center is a member of the Southeastern New York Library Resources Council. The Reher's collections include photographs, recipes, and archaeological finds. Its gallery opened in 2018.

The bakery opened in 1908 and closed in the 1980s. It was opened by Ade Reher an immigrant from Russia. It was willed to a Jewish organization in 2004, became part of a non-profit, and was converted into a historical museum beginning in 2014.

Students from a local Boards of Cooperative Educational Services (BOCES) trade school helped install the HVAC system.

It was a kosher bakery. Customers whose names were found on a paper bag in the building were interviewed as part of an oral history project. Artifacts from the building have been archived.

== Website ==
- Website
