= Museum Night (Croatia) =

Annual event in Croatia

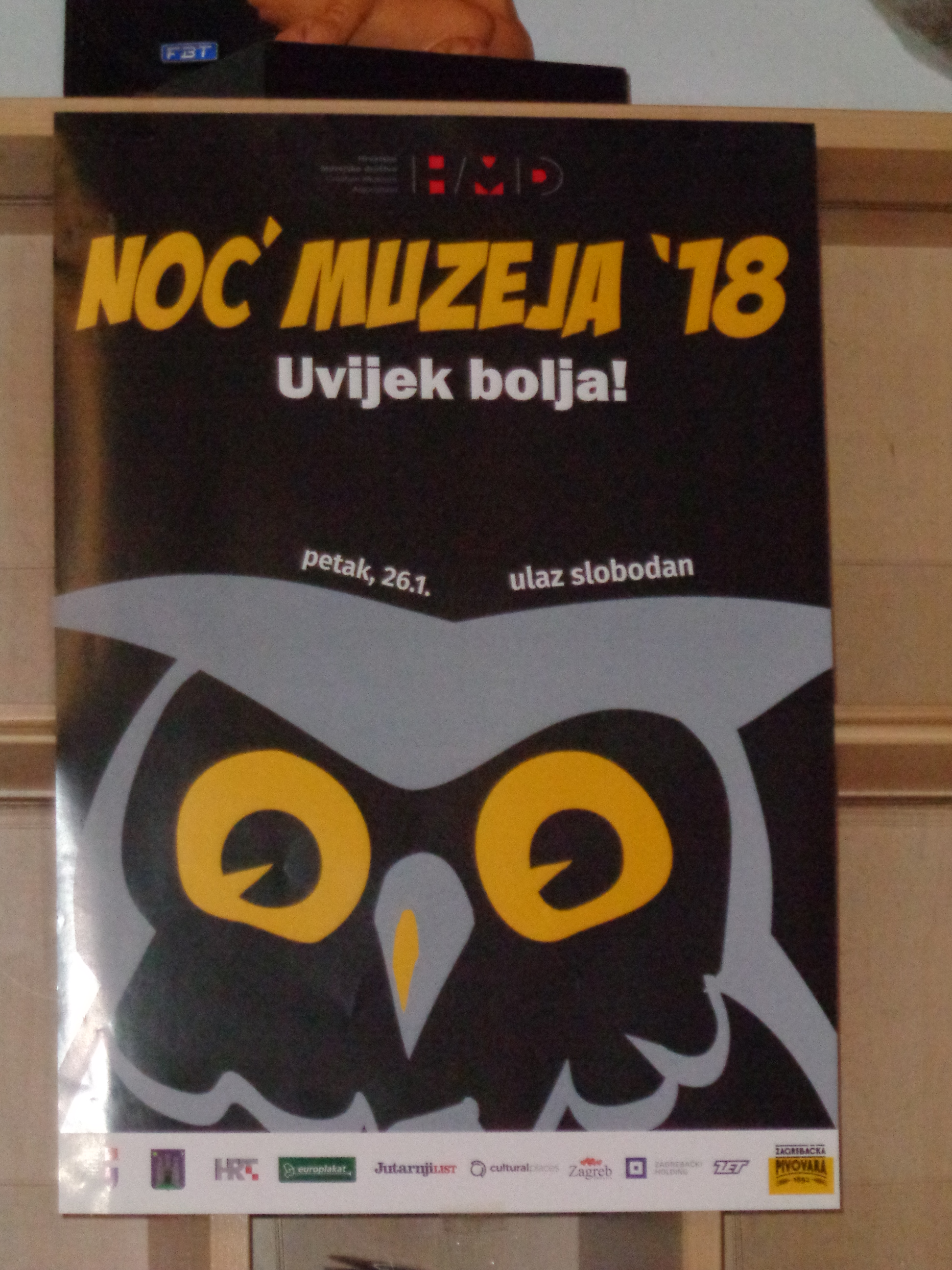
The 2018 Night of Museums poster

Museum Night (Croatian: Noć muzeja) is an annual event in Croatia. During one night in the year (usually on the last Friday in January), the entrance fee to most of the museums in Croatia is waived.

== History ==
Museum Night was first held in December 2005, with only six museums from Zagreb area participating, drawing 10,000 visitors. The event evolved to include museums in the rest of Croatia in the following years, with over 200 museums participating. In 2014, there were 360,000 museum-goers during the Museum Night, with 800 performances held.
