= Long Night of Museums =

Cultural event in which museums open late

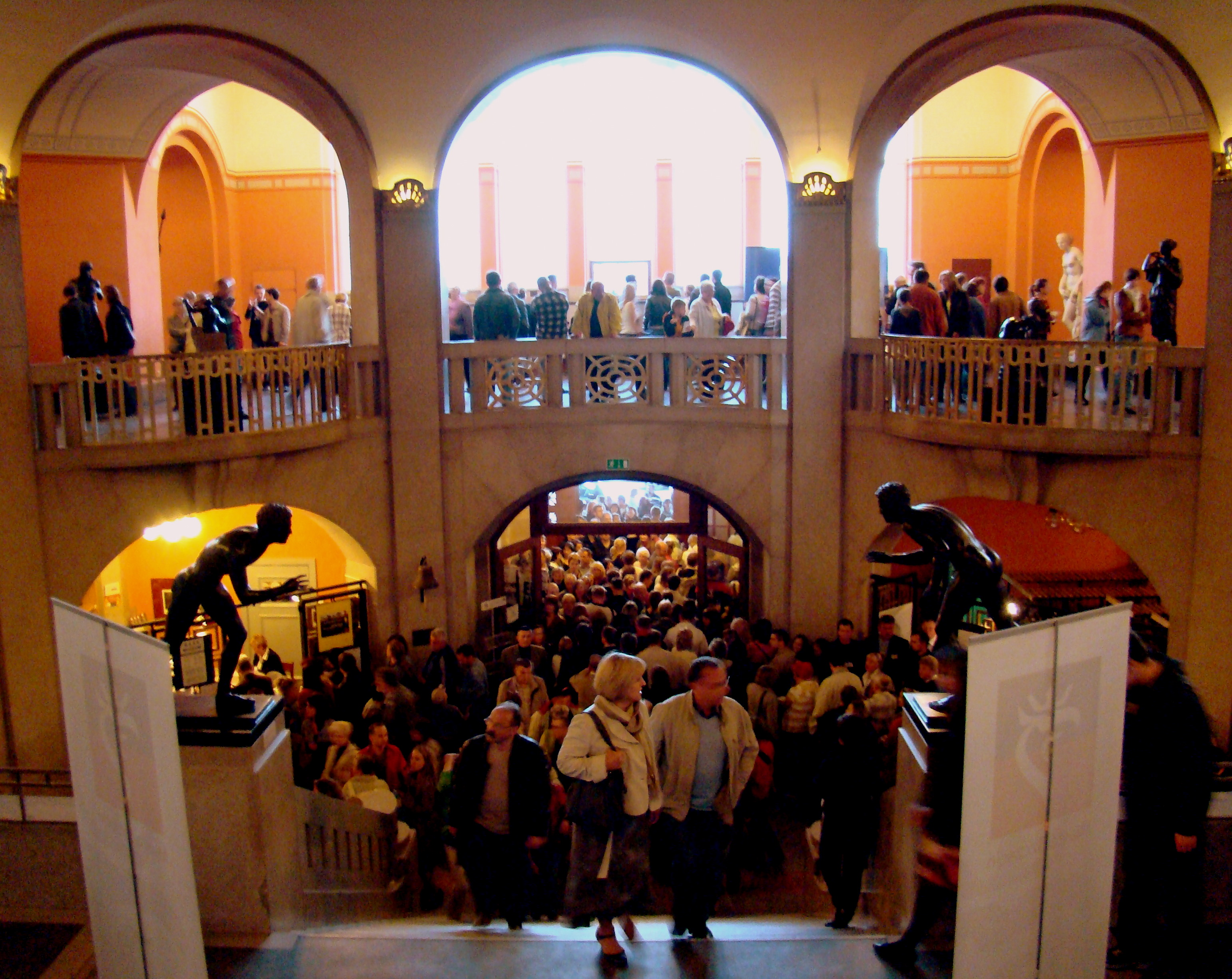
The Long Night of Museums in The National Museum in Szczecin (2009)

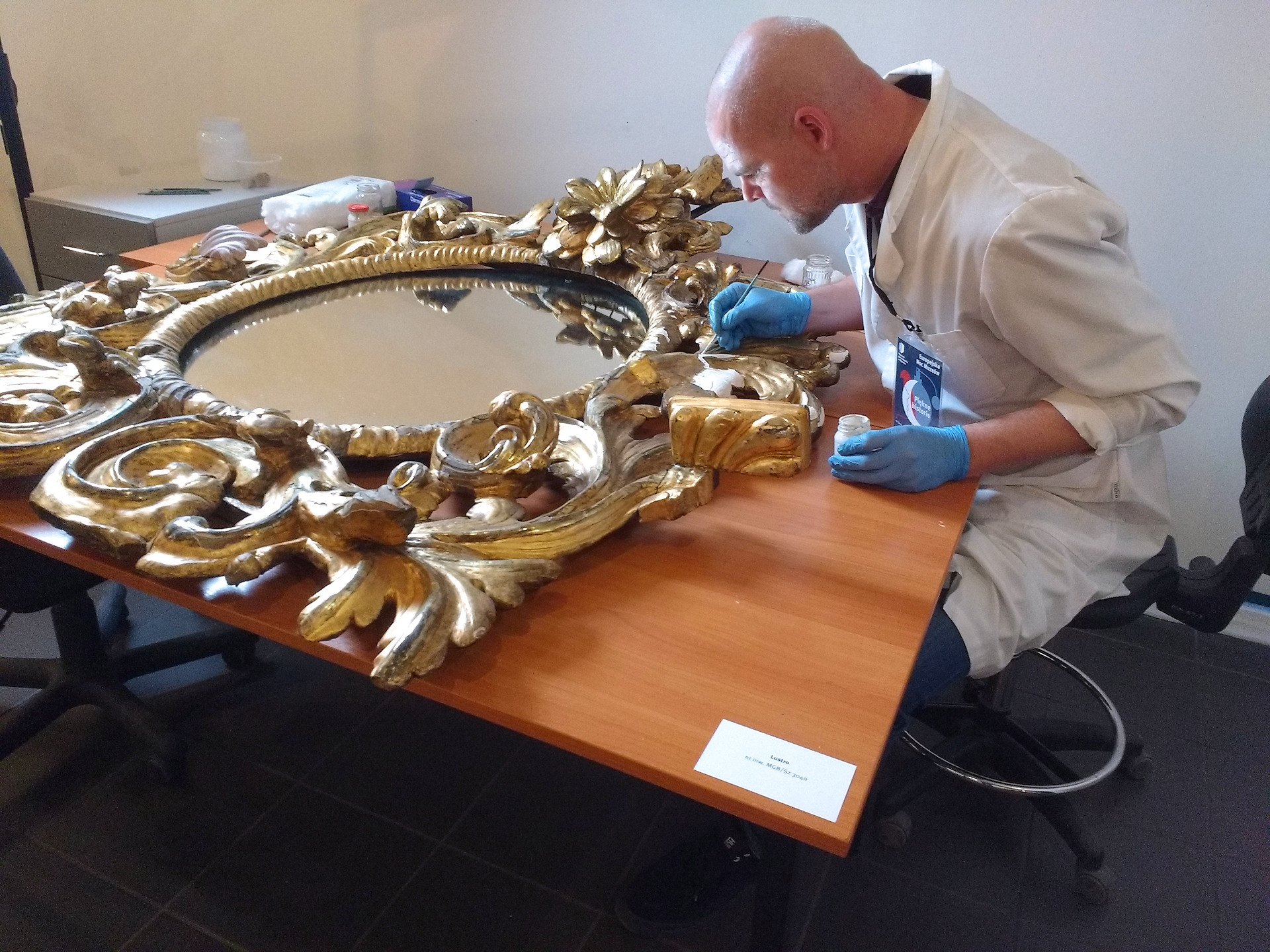
Presentation of antique restoration in Upper Silesian Museum in Bytom, Poland

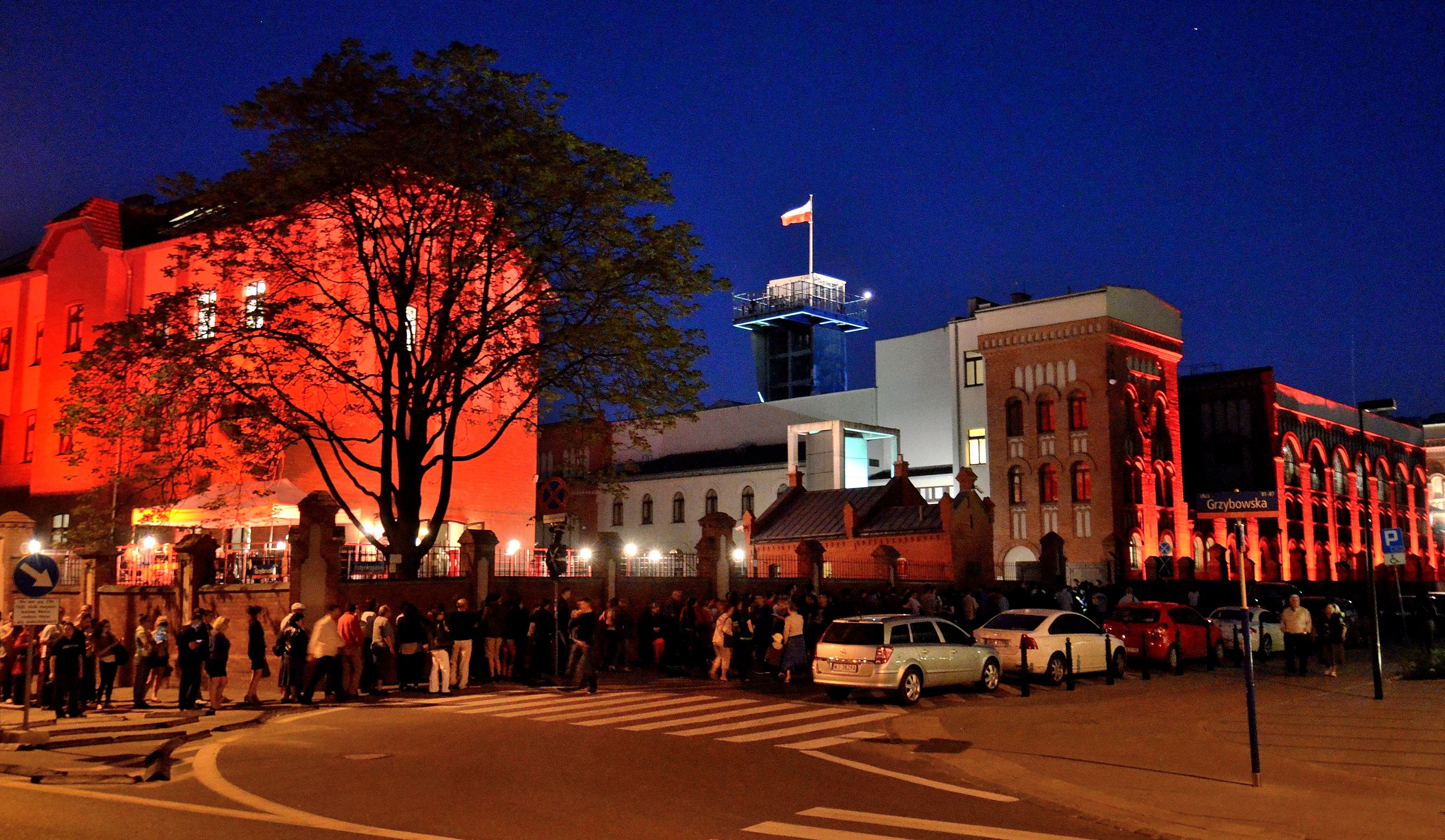
Night visitors queuing at the Warsaw Uprising Museum (2013)

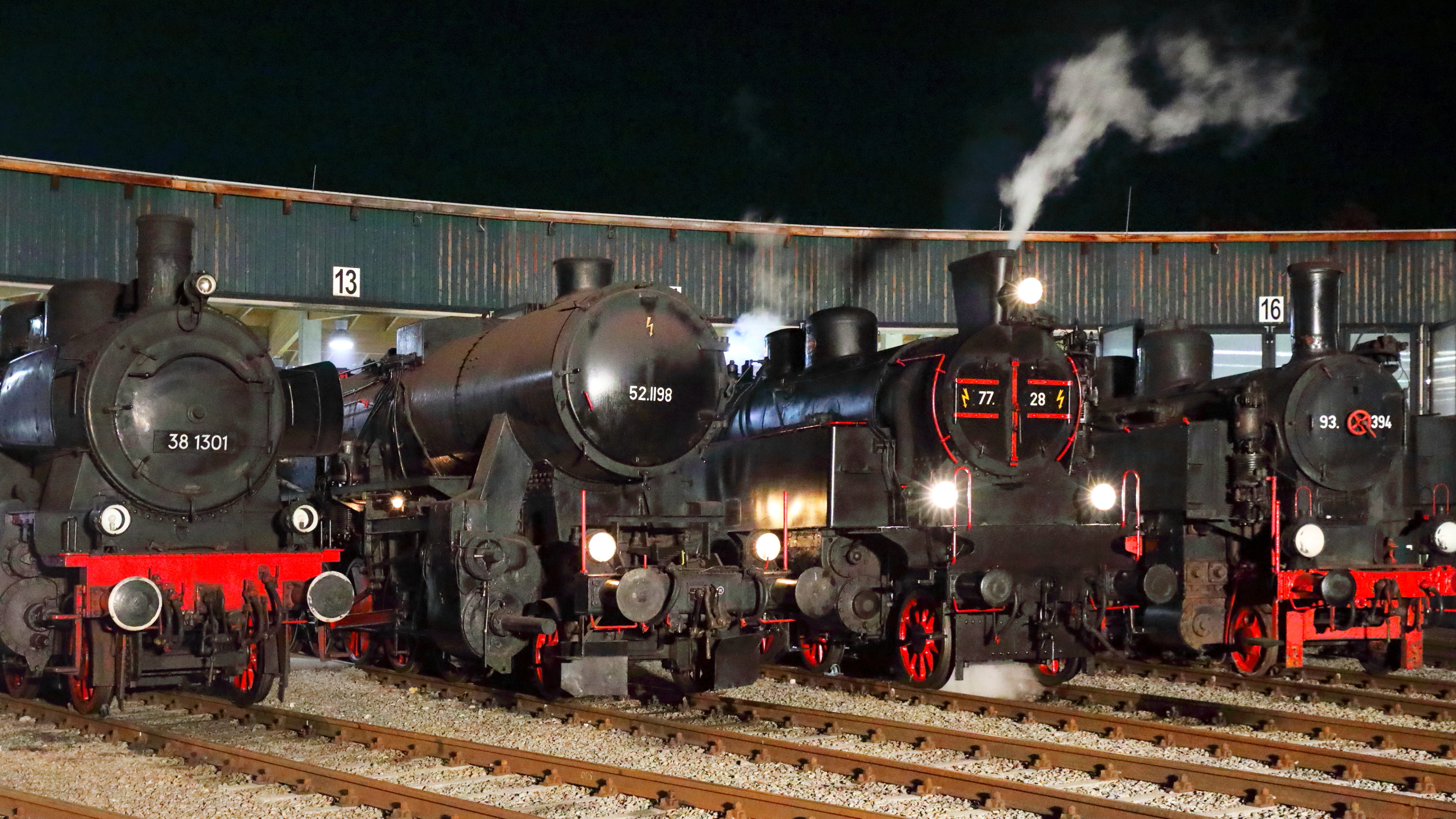
Steam locomotives parade as part of the Long Night of the Museums in Ampflwang, Upper Austria

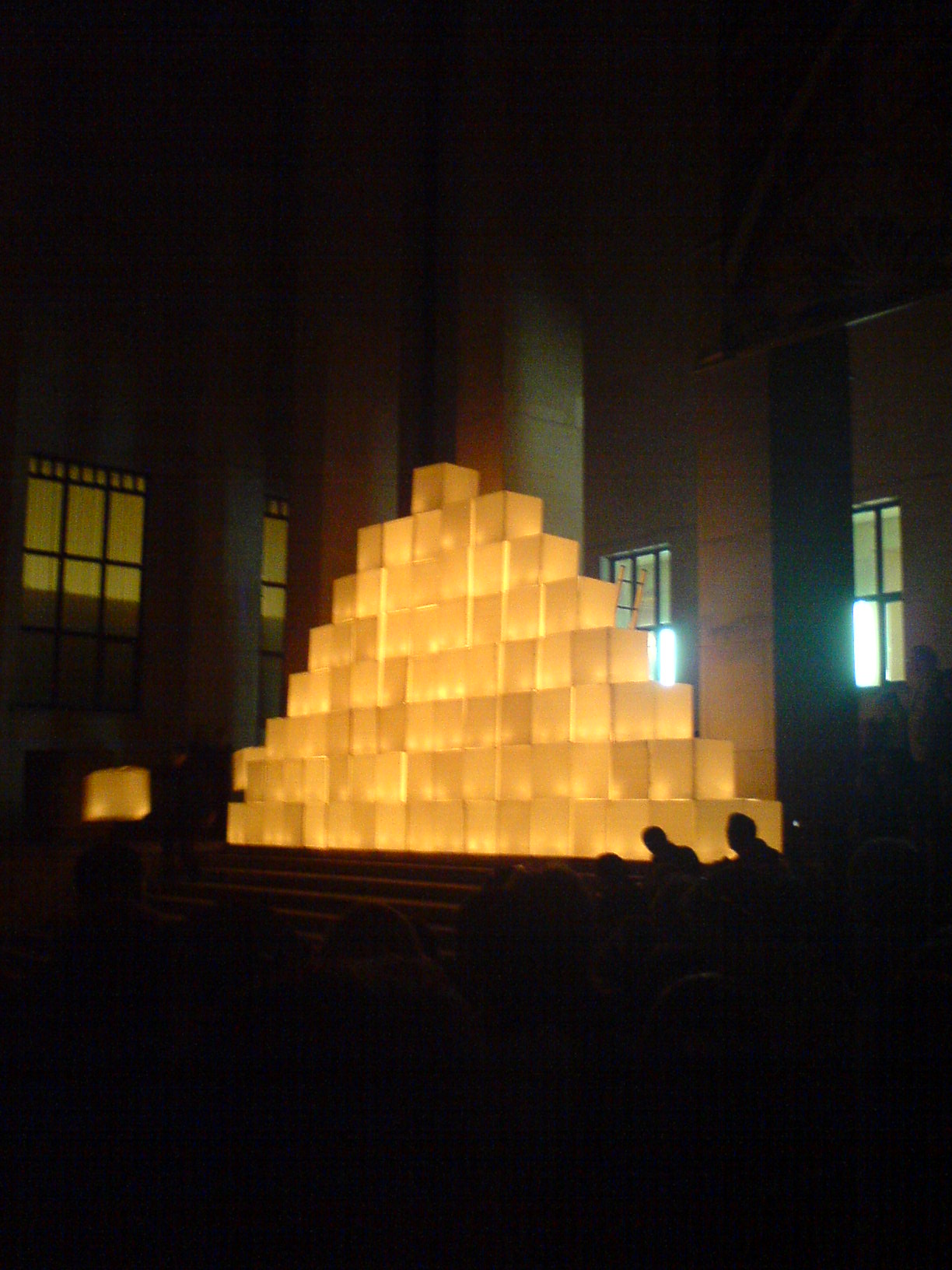
Artistic performance "Light and gravity" at National Museum in Warsaw (Night of Museums, 2007)

The Long Night of Museums (German: Lange Nacht der Museen), or the Night of Museums, and, since 2005, the European Night of Museums, is a cultural event in which museums and cultural institutions remain open late into the night to introduce themselves to new potential patrons. Visitors are given a common entrance pass which grants them access to all exhibits as well as complimentary public transportation within the area.

The first Lange Nacht der Museen took place in Berlin in 1997. The concept was very well received. In 2005 the Council of Europe, UNESCO and the International Council of Museums joined to promote this event with the goal of improving access to culture.

Museum Night takes place on the third Saturday of May. Most recently in 2021, some 1200 museums in 120 cities throughout Europe, as well as other nations including Argentina and the Philippines, welcomed nearly 2 million visitors to their collections.

== Participants ==
=== Europe ===
- Lange Nacht der Museen in Berlin and other cities of Germany including Cologne, Frankfurt, Stuttgart, Düsseldorf, Munich, Hamburg, Kassel and Heidelberg/Mannheim/Ludwigshafen
- Nuit Blanche in Paris, and La Nuit des Musées in France
- Museumnacht event in Amsterdam, Netherlands
- Coordinated long nights in Austria, Italy and Liechtenstein, organized by ORF
- In Switzerland long nights have taken place in Basel, Bern, Lucerne, St. Gallen and Zürich. Some Nuits des musées are also organized in Lausanne, Fribourg and Geneva.
- Noc Muzeów in Poland, where the first edition took place in 2003 in Poznań in the Poznań National Museum; now over 150 cities and towns take a part in this event.
- Múzeumok Éjszakája in Hungary
- "Night of museums and galleries" in Bulgaria, "The Night" has become a successful cultural product - emblematic for Sofia and Plovdiv - that attracts tens of thousands of visitors.
- Museums at Night in the UK, including museums in Great Yarmouth
- La nit dels museus in Barcelona, Spain
- Museum Night Fever in Brussels, Belgium
- Noć muzeja in Croatia, since 2005, where admission fees to all venues are waived for the night.
- Pražská muzejní noc in Prague, Czech Republic
- ღამე მუზეუმში in Georgia, since 2015
- Muziejų naktis in Lithuania, since 2005
- Ночь музеев in Russia,
- Noaptea muzeelor in Romania,
- Ноћ музеја / Noć muzeja in Serbia, since 2005
- Muzeju nakts in Latvia, since 2005
- Թանգարանային գիշեր in Armenia, since 2005
- Museoiden yö in Tampere, Finland, since 2008
- Muuseumiöö in Estonia, since 2009
- Noc múzeí a galérií in Slovakia
- Ніч музеїв in Ukraine, since 2009
- Ноћ музеја / Noć muzeja in Republic of Srpska, Bosnia and Herzegovina, since 2006

=== Latin America ===
- La Noche de los Museos in Buenos Aires, Argentina, where first edition took place in 2004. Since then, the number of museums and "barrios" (neighbourhoods) participating in the event has risen considerably. The 2013 edition featured 189 museums and cultural institutions that received more than 800,000 visitors.

=== Asia ===
- Gabii sa Kabilin or Night of Heritage in Cebu, Philippines, started in 2007, first in the Asia-Pacific Region
- Nuit Blanche (白晝之夜) in Zhongzhen Dist, Taipei, Taiwan, started in 2016. The first Nuit Blanche Taipei was held in 2016 which was invited by Bureau Français de Taipei. To highlight Taipei’s art capacity internationally, this event links Taipei and international cities, increasing international cultural capital exchange and raising the city’s international profile through varied cultural performances. The 7th Nuit Blanche is in Shihlin Dist, Taipei held on 2 October to 3 October 2022.

== History ==
The current all-night festivals trace their roots to several cities.

The first Long Night of Museums took place in the newly re-united Berlin in 1997 with a dozen participating institutions and exhibitions; since then the number has risen to 125 with over 150,000 people taking part in the January 2005 night.

It drew on a European heritage of all-night cultural events, such as the annual White Nights Festival, a long-standing cultural festival in St Petersburg.

The Mayor of Paris Bertrand Delanoë took this idea in 2002 and spread it to culture more broadly, including performing arts, and under the banner of Nuit Blanche (White Nights, and various related names) the concept has spread around the world.
