= Nuit Blanche =

Annual night-time art festival in various cities

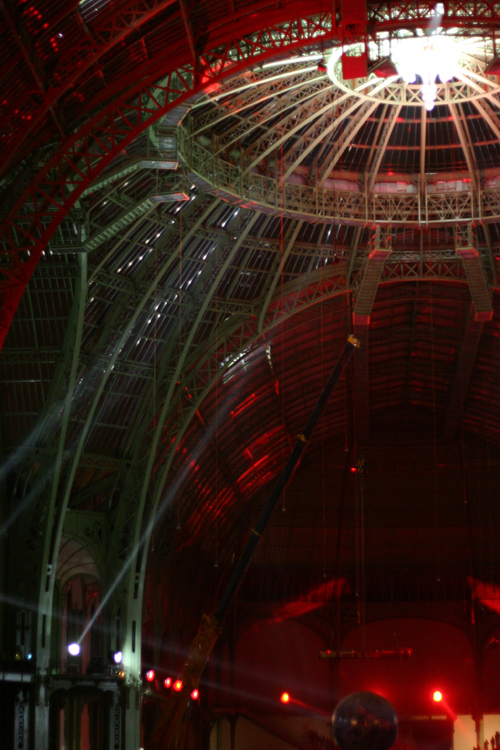
The artistically lit interior of the Grand Palais in Paris by French visual artist Thierry Dreyfus, 2005

Nuit Blanche (French pronunciation: [nɥi ˈblɑ̃ʃ]) (Sleepless Night) (Lit. White Night) is an annual all-night or night-time arts festival of a city. A Nuit Blanche typically has museums, private and public art galleries, and other cultural institutions open and free of charge, with the centre of the city itself being turned into a de facto art gallery, providing space for art installations, performances (music, film, dance, performance art), themed social gatherings, and other activities.

== History ==
In 1989, the Helsinki Festival established its Night of the Arts, "when every gallery, museum and bookshop is open until midnight or later and the whole city becomes one giant performance and carnival venue". A year later, the mayor of Nantes, Jean-Marc Ayrault's program included renovating the central city and establishing a "contemporary patrimony", which led arts programmer Jean Blaise to create a late-night cultural festival, "Les Allumées" ("Things Alight"). His concept was to have an arts festival in Nantes, from 6 pm to 6 am, over six years with artists from six cities.

They were as follows:

- Barcelona, 15–20 October 1990
- St. Petersburg, 14–19 October 1991
- Buenos Aires, 19–24 October 1992
- Naples, 18–23 October 1993
- Cairo, 17–22 October 1994
- Havana, 16–21 October 1995. (The Cuban government refused to issue travel documents to the 300 artists expected, so the event was formally cancelled, though events did take place.)

In 1993, a year and a half after the St. Petersburg edition of Les Allumées, the annual White Nights Festival in that city began adding a specifically cultural component to a longstanding annual event that included street carnivals and the Scarlet Sails celebration. The expanded White Nights Festival has included pop culture (e.g. the Rolling Stones in the open air at Palace Square) in 2007 and high culture events ("Stars of the White Nights Festival" at the Mariinsky Theatre under Valery Gergiev) every year since 1993.

In 1997, the Long Night of Museums, took place in the newly re-united Berlin with a dozen participating schools and exhibitions; the number has risen to 125, with over 150,000 people taking part in the January 2005 night.

In 2001, when Bertrand Delanoë became Mayor of Paris, his deputy, Christophe Girard, invited Blaise to create an event there, and the Nuit Blanche was born. The concept of Les Allumées was scaled down to a single night and focused on the offerings of Paris. "The first night-time trail through the streets of Paris and its contemporary-art scene took place on 5 October 2002, and the opportunity for anyone to explore artistic creation for a night has come back every year since."

The idea of a night-time festival of the arts has spread around the world, with events in over 120 cities, including Montreal, Ottawa, Toronto, Edmonton, Calgary, Halifax, Winnipeg and Saskatoon in Canada, and several European capitals (Paris, Brussels, Rome, Madrid, Riga, Bucharest and Valletta) which have chosen to pool their efforts as "Nuits Blanches Europe". The cities share their experiences and exchange projects and artists. Each year, new cities become candidates.

In 2013, Melbourne hosted Australia's first White Night event with the city's galleries, theatres, music venues, laneways, shops and major cultural institutions all showcasing the city's art and culture, food and wine, fashion and sport. This first Melbourne White Night saw an estimated 300,000 people attend, exceeding initial estimates and constituting the largest event of its kind in Australia.

Continuing with its international success, Nuit Blanche was announced to be held in Santiago, Chile during 2015, making this important South American capital part of the Nuit Blanche international community. In the capital of Colombia, Bogota, the "Noche en Blanco" was made between 2013 and 2015.

== See also ==
- Culture night, a similar event in which museums and galleries in a city or country remain open until late on a particular night of the year
