= Scarlet Sails =

Scarlet Sails may refer to:

- Scarlet Sails (film), a 1961 Soviet film starring Vasily Lanovoy and Anastasiya Vertinskaya
- Scarlet Sails (novel), a 1923 novel by Alexander Grin, basis for the film
- Scarlet Sails (tradition), a ceremony during the White Nights Festival in St. Petersburg, Russia
- Scarlet Sails (band), an American indie rock band
