= White Nights Festival =

Annual summer festival in St. Petersburg, Russia

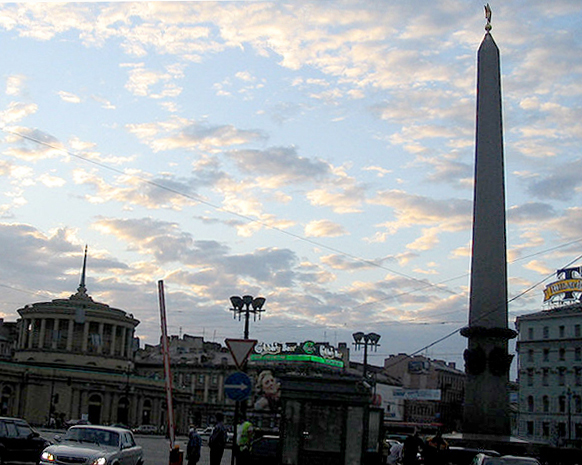
Ploshchad Vosstaniya in Saint Petersburg 28 June 2006 at 11 p.m., demonstrating the degree of sunlight still present during White Nights

The White Nights Festival is an annual summer festival in St. Petersburg dedicated to the phenomenon of midnight twilight due to its location near the Arctic Circle: Every year, from about April 22 to August 21, the night sky only reaches twilight and never reaches complete darkness. Highlights of the festival include, Classical ballet, opera, music at the White Nights Festival, the secret sails and fireworks tradition, carnivals and star performances by international artists. The festival includes concerts by musicians and performers of various genres. International artists perform as headliners at the festival.

In 2020, the festival was canceled due to the coronavirus pandemic. The festival was held online.

== Highlights of the White Nights Festival ==
=== Classical ballet, opera, music at the White Nights Festival ===
The "Stars of the White Nights" (Music festival "Stars of the White Nights") is a series of classical ballet, opera, and orchestral performances at the Mariinsky Theatre and the Mariinsky Concert Hall, as the essential part of the White Nights Festival in St. Petersburg. The artistic director of the festival is Valery Gergiev.

The "Stars of the White Nights" festival was originally started by the first mayor of St. Petersburg, Anatoly Sobchak, and has been held annually since 1993. Some of the stars who performed here include Plácido Domingo, Olga Borodina, Alfred Brendel, Anna Netrebko, Carlo Maria Giulini, Yuri Temirkanov, Gidon Kremer, Esa-Pekka Salonen, Alexander Toradze, Deborah Voigt, James Conlon and many other classical performers.

=== Pop music ===
The festival will feature concerts by popular music performers from Eastern Europe, Asia and other countries of the world, as well as an international competition for young vocalists. Over the years, the headliners of the pop music festival were Chris Norman, Bonnie Tyler, Deep Purple, Level 42, Scorpions, Patricia Kaas, Eros Ramazzotti, Anastacia, Seal, Jason Derulo, Svetlana Loboda, A-Studio, Vera Brezhneva, Sergei Lazarev, and in 2019 a tribute to the 50-year career of Alla Pugacheva.

=== Scarlet Sails celebration ===
The Scarlet Sails celebration in St. Petersburg is a public event during the White Nights, known in Russian as "Alye Parusa" festivity. The event is highly popular for spectacular fireworks and a massive show celebrating the end of the school year: "Scarlet Sails" celebration in St. Petersburg

The popularity of both the book and the tradition was boosted after the 1961 release of the movie titled "Alye parusa" ("Scarlet sails" in English), starring Anastasiya Vertinskaya and Vasily Lanovoy.

=== Carnivals of the White Nights ===
A series of carnivals take place during the White Nights Festival in St. Petersburg.

=== Star performances at the Palace Square ===
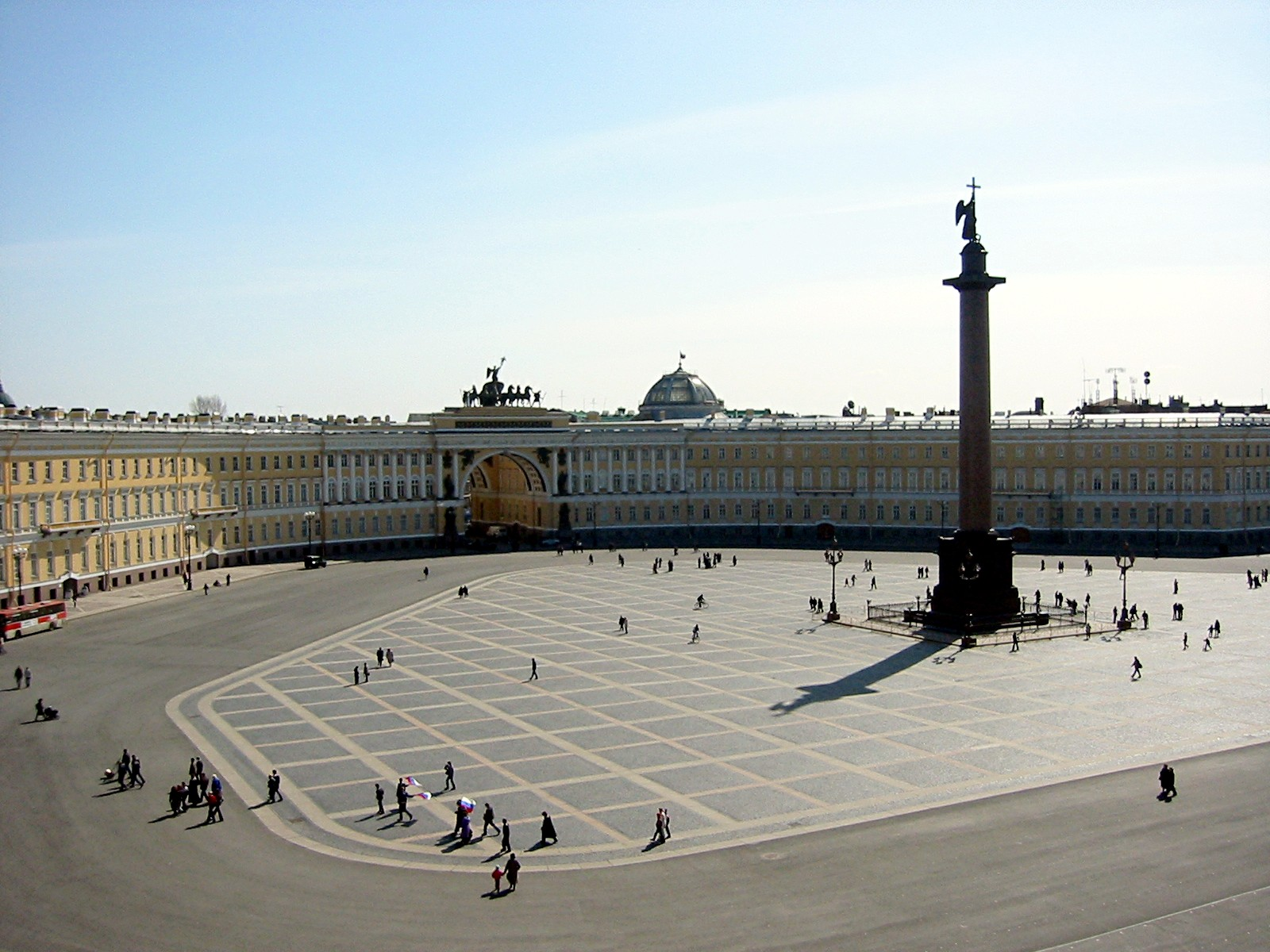
Palace Square with the Alexander Column view from the Winter Palace

Every summer in St. Petersburg the Palace Square becomes a stage for international stars of popular music.

=== Marathon ===
From 1990 to 2019 and resuming in 2024, the festival has included the White Nights International Marathon and 10K run through the streets of St. Petersburg. More than 5,000 runners take part each year.

== White Nights Festival in the media ==
Several film festivals take place around the time of the White Nights Festival.

== See also ==
- Russian pop music
- Midsummer
