= English Embankment =

Street in St. Petersburg, Russia

Coordinates: 59.9341°N 30.2932°E

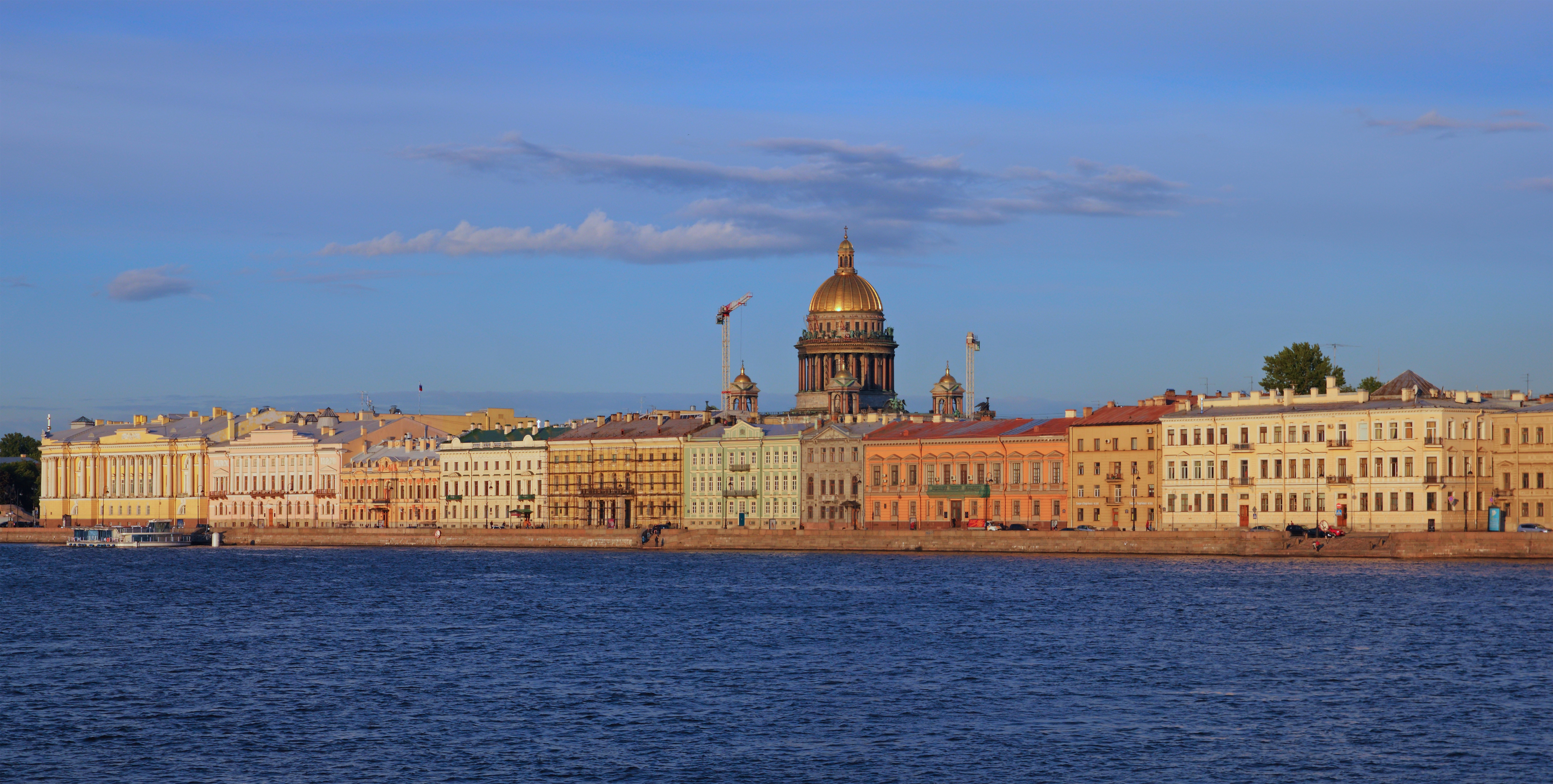
Angliyskaya Embankment, with the dome of St. Isaac's in the background

The English Embankment (Russian: Англи́йская на́бережная, romanized: Angliyskaya naberezhnaya) or English Quay is a street along the left bank of the Bolshaya Neva River in Central Saint Petersburg. It has been historically one of the most fashionable streets in Saint Petersburg, and in the 19th century was called by the French term, Promenade des Anglais. It was from the English Embankment that at 2 am on October 25, 1917, the gunshot from the Aurora sent the signal to storm the Winter Palace during the Russian Revolution.

The English Embankment runs perpendicular to the south end of the Annunciation Bridge and spans between the Novo-Admiralteysky Canal and the Decembrists Square, where it becomes the Admiralty Embankment.

== History ==
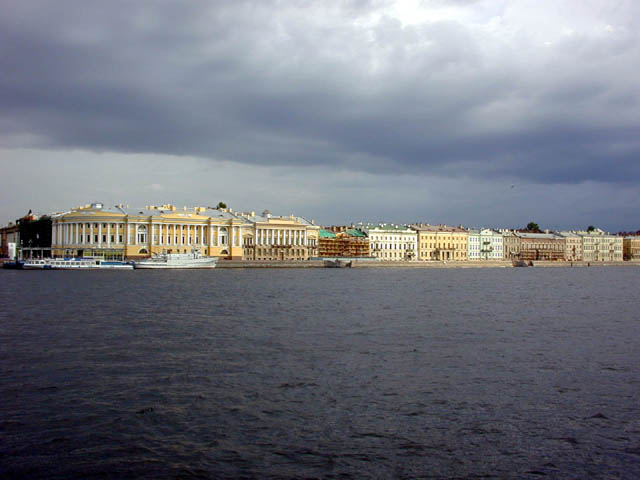
The English Embankment with the Senate and Synod buildings, view from Vasilievsky Island

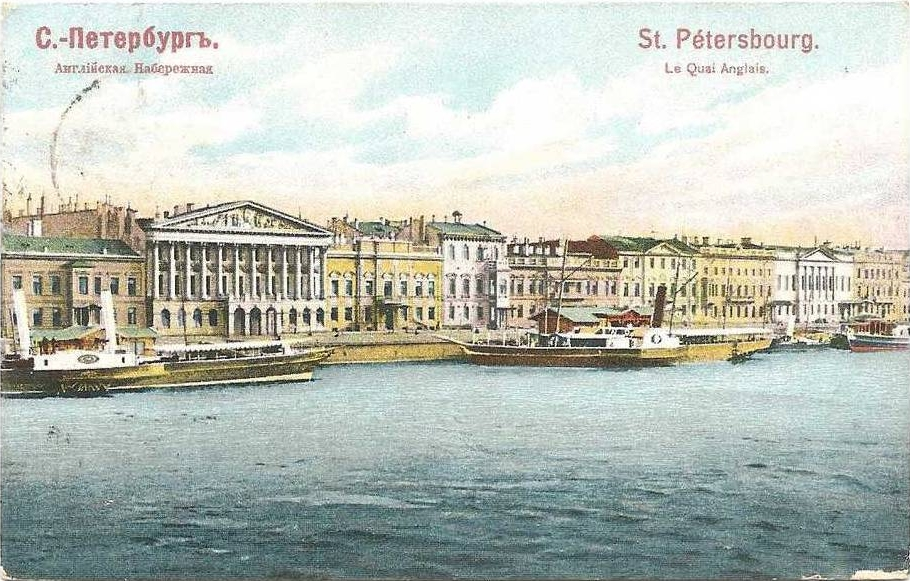
Angliyskaya Embankment at the end of the 19th century

=== The British Embassy and church ===
The English Embankment was built between 1763 and 1767. It is named after the former British Embassy and the English church that was located at No56, the building is now occupied by the Travel and Sightseeing Bureau. The English church was built in 1814 and 1815 to a design by Giacomo Quarenghi, it is preserved as architectural landmark. The interior of the English church is highlighted with marble, historic paintings, and boasts a large pipe organ - the only English organ existing in Russia. The last British Ambassador left in 1918, after the Russian Revolution.

=== Battleship Aurora during the revolution ===
Next to the Annunciation Bridge is a monument commemorating the 1917 Bolshevik Revolution. From this historic spot, at 2 am on October 25, 1917, the gunshot from the Aurora sent the signal to storm the Winter Palace. The symbolism of the name "Aurora" was its meaning as "the dawn of a new era" in history. This historic spot has been since a traditional location for a swear-in ceremony for new members of the Pioneers and the Komsomol organisations.

=== Annual appearance of the "Scarlet Sails" ===
Another historic tradition that started at the English Embankment in St. Petersburg has been the popular appearance of a boat with "Scarlet Sails" (Алые паруса). This tradition began here after the end of the Second World War, when schools united to celebrate the ending of a school year in connection with symbolism of the popular children's book Scarlet Sails by Alexander Grin. At that time a boat with scarlet sails was sailing along the English Embankment and the Admiralty Embankment towards the Winter Palace. Although it was designed to update the rusty revolutionary propaganda, the "Scarlet Sails" tradition has become a popular public event ever since, celebrating the annual ending of school year in June. The "Scarlet sails" appearance is now part of the White Nights celebration.

== Today ==
One of the most prestigious locations in St. Petersburg, the English Embankment today is mostly home to corporate offices located in former palatial houses of imperial Russian nobility and pre-revolutionary foreign embassies. It is a very popular sightseeing destination among tourists because of the view of the Neva and palaces across the river. The Menshikov Palace and the Academy of Arts building on the Vasilevsky Island across the river. Many boat tours start at the embankment, taking tourists on a journey about canals and bridges of St. Petersburg.

The Constitutional Court of Russia is scheduled to move to the former Senate and Synod buildings at the Decembrists Square and English Embankment in St. Petersburg by 2008. The move will partially restore Saint Petersburg's historic status, making the city the second judicial capital.
