= Robert Buchar =

American film director

Robert Buchar is an American cinematographer, filmmaker, film director and producer, born in 1951 in Hradec Králové, former Czechoslovakia.

In 1966, he came to Prague to study photography at the Secondary School of Graphic Arts, and cinematography at FAMU, the Film Academy of Fine Arts, where he graduated as M.F.A. in 1975. He worked as a cinematographer mainly for the documentary section of Krátký film, before defecting to the United States in 1980. There he worked as a cameraman for CBS until 1989, photographed over twenty films and documentaries in the U.S. and Europe. He also works as director of photography on independent films and commercials.

Since 1989, he teaches cinematography at the Columbia College in Chicago, where he became head of the Cinematography Concentration, the faculty's cinematography program, an advanced production course he developed.

== Documentary features ==
=== Velvet Hangover ===
His, and David Smith's, feature-length documentary film Velvet Hangover about the Czech New Wave and the Czech film industry before and after the Velvet Revolution was screened in film festivals around the world. Some of the critics' appraisals:

... an intriguing historical document which charts the state of Czech cinema in the sixties, under the years of Normalisation in the seventies and eighties, and its encounter with the new economic "liberalism" of the nineties ...

... a long-overdue doc on that dark period and the perceived post-1989 Velvet Revolution industry doldrums ... lengthy and composed primarily of talking heads, pic is riveting across the board: Human rights advocates and fans of true-life underdog tales will be as enraptured as students of Eastern European cinema ... a must for fests, tube and vid ... a veritable gold mine of behind-the-scenes info on the fates of various New Wave filmmakers in two distinct periods ...

... archly-titled anatomy of Czech film, past and present ... recollections ... frank commentary from the directors and cinematographers themselves ... a riveting document ... all remarkably articulate and offer their convictions eloquently, in an understated way ... Fourteen prominent figures, young and old ... Some are angry, some melancholy. They reminisce: they muse; they judge; they tell personal anecdotes ... Velvet Hangover compels ... the filmmakers raise issues that are universal. Should film entertain or bear some moral purpose? Can film communicate ideas? Should contemporary themes be a focus? ... generated passionate reactions among Czech officials and the media ... trouble getting [the film] aired or shown theatrically, although it has been making the rounds at festivals and film clubs ... national television asked Buchar to take out Milota's unflattering remarks about President Václav Havel. He refused. Outrage over a seeming return to censorship finally forced Czech TV to air the film ...

Featuring in Velvet Hangover (in alphabetic order):

- Jaroslav Bouček
- Jaroslav Brabec
- Věra Chytilová
- Saša Gedeon
- Zuzana Hojdová-Zemanová
- Jiří Krejčík
- Antonín Máša
- Jiří Menzel
- Stanislav Milota
- Jan Němec
- Ivan Passer
- Jan Svěrák
- Karel Vachek
- Otakar Vávra
- Drahomíra Vihanová

=== The Collapse of Communism – The Untold Story ===
Currently (November 2009) Buchar's another documentary The Collapse of Communism – The Untold Story is in postproduction. According to some critics, it showcases the KGB's orchestration and management of the breakup of the Soviet Union. According to some critics, it promotes a conspiracy theory that the fall of communism in Eastern Europe was a hoax. Buchar's own view (supporting his critics):

Our witnesses testify that what appeared to be a spontaneous freedom movement in 1989 was in fact a coup d'état orchestrated from Moscow—in offices of the Russian KGB ...
... People will simply believe what they wish to believe. More people indulge their own ideas of the world rather than deal with its realities ...
... I realized that the collapse of the communism in Europe is one of the most incredible stories of the century and the public should know what really happened ...
... I collected unprecedented body of interviews that, when edited together, paints the big picture of what really happened ...
... After all it may be useful for you to find out who framed Roger Rabbit ...

Featuring in The Collapse of Communism (in alphabetic order):

- Tennent H. Bagley
- Vladimir Bukovsky
- Angelo Codevilla
- Petr Cibulka
- František Doskočil
- Joseph D.Douglass, Jr.
- Edward Jay Epstein
- Robert M. Gates
- Bill Gertz
- Oleg Gordievsky
- Vladimír Hučín
- Jeff R. Nyquist
- Ion Mihai Pacepa
- Jaromír Štětina
- Pavel Žáček
- Ludvík Žifčák

== Filmography ==
documentaries, feature-length, also as director / producer

- Velvet Hangover, together with David Smith, 1999/2000, USA
  (in Czech: Sametová kocovina, 2002)
- The Collapse of Communism – The Untold Story, 2009/2010, USA

other, (mainly / also) as director of photography

- Four Seasons (in Czech: Čtvero ročních dob), 2008
- Bear Not to Be, 1968
- Certainly, 1969
- The Club, 1971
- In the Sign of Eagle, 1978
- The Comets, 1979
- City in the Center of the City, 1979
- Ethology of Animals, 1980
- Basic Meditation Exercise, directed by George Drasnar (Jiří Drašnar)^{(in Czech)}, 1981
- Go West-Sing West, 1991
- Where are you, 1992
- The Land of Youth, 1992
- Granny, 1998
- Poslední z rodu, directed by Drahomíra Vihanová, Czechoslovakia, 1977

== Books ==
- Czech New Wave Filmmakers in Interviews, foreword by Antonin J. Liehm, McFarland & Company, 2003 (based upon the Velvet Hangover documentary)
- And Reality be Damned ... December 2009, Eloquent Strategic Publishing (based upon The Collapse of Communism – The Untold Story documentary)
  in Czech: Revoluce 1989 – utajené informace ze zákulisí, Brána, 2009

professional

- Design of the photographic and the cinematographic image, with Jan Smok, Academy of Performing Arts in Prague, Prague 2001
- The Spotmeter and its application in cinematography and video (on proper metering techniques)
