= Anastasiya Vertinskaya =

Soviet and Russian actress

- Анастасия Вертинская
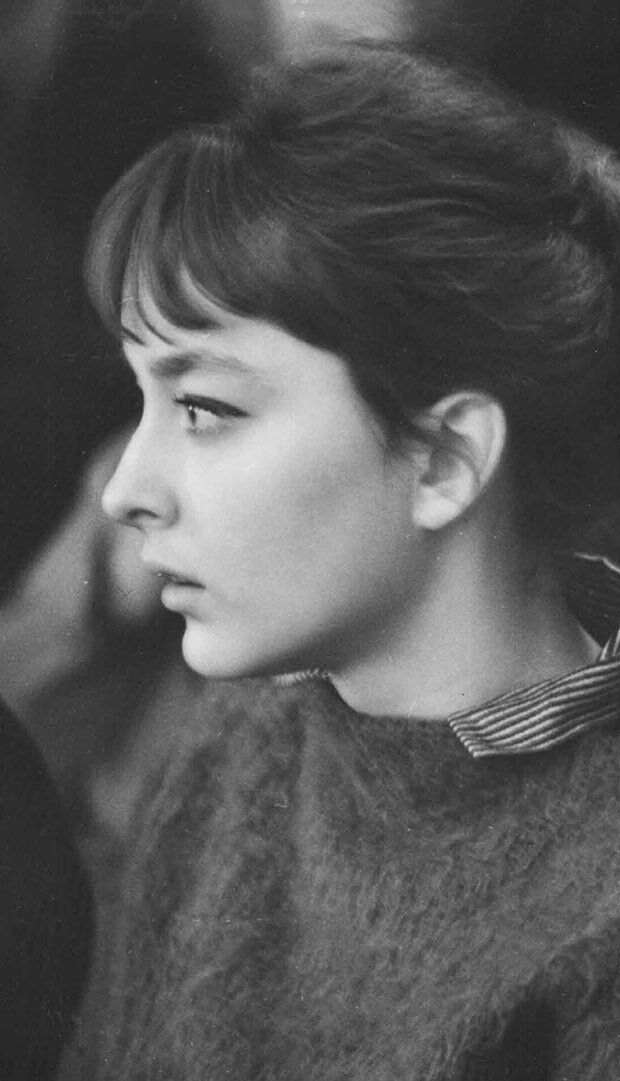
- Anastasiya Vertinskaya is watching a play staged by Yuri Lyubimov at Boris Shchukin Theatre Institute. 1964.
- Born: Anastasiya Alexandrovna Vertinskaya; 19 December 1944 (age 81); Moscow, Russian SFSR, Soviet Union
- Occupation: Actress
- Years active: 1961–2002
- Spouse: Nikita Mikhalkov (1967–1970)
- Awards: People's Artist of Russia (1988); Order of Honour (2005); Order of Friendship (2010)

Anastasiya Alexandrovna Vertinskaya (Russian: Анастасия Александровна Вертинская, born 19 December 1944) is a Soviet and Russian actress, who came to prominence in the early 1960s with her acclaimed performances in Scarlet Sails, Amphibian Man and Grigori Kozintsev's Hamlet.

In the 1990s, disillusioned with the state of cinema at home, she went abroad to teach and spent 12 years in France, England, the United States and Switzerland. In 1988 Vertinskaya was designated a People's Artist of Russia. She is also a recipient of the Order of Honour (2005) and the Order of Friendship (2010).

== Biography ==
Anastasiya Vertinskaya was born on 19 December 1944, in Moscow, soon after her father, the famous singer-songwriter Alexander Vertinsky returned from Harbin with his Georgian wife, painter and actress Lidiya Vertinskaya (née Tsirgvava). Anastasiya and her sister Marianna (one year her senior) spent their early years in the Moscow Metropol hotel; it was only in 1946 that the family was granted a proper flat at Gorky Street, 14. Their childhood was happy, growing up in a bi-lingual family, Anastasiya enjoyed intellectually stimulating environment and the rich cultural atmosphere of her parents' circle. Both sisters attended an ordinary school; studying music and foreign languages were regarded as educational priorities by their parents.

Vertinsky never scolded his daughters for failures, of which there were many because, as Anastasiya later remembered, she was more concerned at the time with exploring her dad's vast library than with her school studies. Alexander developed his own way of dealing with his daughters' problems. "He used to say: 'Now, the news of your misbehaviour make me suffer enormously' and I tried my best to somehow harness this nasty temper of mine – if only to relieve him from those sufferings," Vertinskaya remembered decades later.

=== Career ===
Young Anastasiya Vertinskaya was thinking of a career in linguistics, but things changed overnight in 1961 when the then sixteen-year-old was approached personally by the film director Aleksandr Ptushko for the role of Assol in Scarlet Sails. The romantic teenage drama based on Alexander Grin's novel became an instant success, making Anastasiya a national celebrity. Many of the future stars of Soviet cinema, including Vasily Lanovoy, Ivan Pereverzev, Sergey Martinson, and Oleg Anofriev, were in the cast, but, as critics noted, it was Vertinskaya's passionate performance that gave Scarlet Sails its flavour. 23 million people viewed the film during its first year.

In 1962 Vertinskaya starred in the Amphibian Man, Gennady Kazansky and Vladimir Chebotarev's adaptation of Alexander Belyayev's science fiction novel of the same title. Cast as Gutierrez, a young woman in love with an amphibian man, Vertinskaya had to go through difficult late autumn underwater shooting sessions which she performed all by herself, without any stuntwomen involved. The film became the Soviet 1962 box-office blockbuster. "Vertinskaya was now a brand. People were going to the cinema to watch her, specifically," her future husband Nikita Mikhalkov later recalled. All this changed the teenage actress's life dramatically. "In those days there weren't any bodyguards. I used to travel by tram to my studies. I had to queue for bread like everyone else. Not only was I recognized, they made a point of touching me too... It was in those days that I developed the fear of crowds... This immense psychic violence haunted me all through those years," she later remembered.

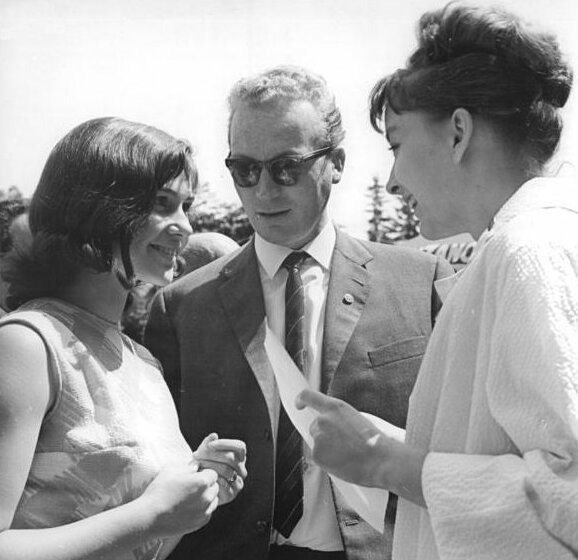
At the KVIFF with Renate Blume, 1964

In 1962 Vertinskaya joined the Moscow Pushkin Drama Theatre troupe. This meant that from then on she had to continuously tour the country with the then popular so-called "theater brigades". In 1963, assisted by Lyudmila Maksakova, her elder sister Marianna's friend, Vertinskaya enrolled into the Boris Shchukin Theatre Institute. The young actress' eagerness to act was, in her own words, "next to maniacal." Nikita Mikhalkov was one of her fellow students. They fell in love and married in 1966, only to be divorced three years later.

The role of Ophelia in the 1964 Grigori Kozintsev film Hamlet (starring Innokentiy Smoktunovsky) made Vertinskaya known internationally and proved to be a turning point in her career. As Kozintsev later wrote, Vertinskaya's strength was her "fragile purity and this Renaissance look she had." For the young actress working next to masters like Smoktunovsky proved to be invaluable in terms of learning, introducing the young actress to many of what she called "this magic kitchen's secrets." "Ophelia made me realize for the first time that acting was indeed my destiny," she later said.

While still at the Shchukin Theatre Institute, Vertinskaya received the role of Princess Bolkonsky in Sergey Bondarchuk's epic adaptation of Leo Tolstoy's War and Peace (1966–1967). It was her sensual, touchingly naive portrayal that gave this character a new, humane dimension. This was the director's idea. According to Vertinskaya,

Sergey Bondarchuk suggested a new, [more] tragic interpretation of this character. She's neither clever nor in any way interesting. Nice, pleasant, home-bound... Had she stayed alive, we wouldn't have loved her. What could she amount to, next to Prince Andrey, her husband? And yet it was her death that prompted him to tempt fate with the question: "Why did this human being have to die, and what for?" What I think Tolstoy tried to warn us against was the tragic mistake we make when we neglect the love of someone who is close to us.

Vertinskaya said it was War and Peace that taught her how to "create a deep tragic undercurrent in something that on the face of it bears no sign of tragedy whatsoever." Less famous but still highly respectable was her performance as Kittie Shcherbatskaya in Aleksandr Zarkhi's 1968 adaptation of Anna Karenina. Among other late 1960s Vertinskaya's films were Hold Your Head Up! (Ne goryui!, by Georgy Daneliya), The Polynin Case (Sluchay s Polyninym, adapted from Konstantin Simonov's book, and The Preliminary Man (Prezhdevremennyi chelovek), Abram Room's adaptation of Maxim Gorky's unfinished novel Yakov Bogomolov.

=== Vertinskaya in theatre ===
In 1967 Vertinskaya joined the Vakhtangov Theatre troupe and spent there one season, before moving to Sovremennik in 1968, where she stayed until 1980. Theatrical experience was, admittedly, of the utmost importance to an actress who never felt confident enough while acting in movies. "I was a slow developer," she admitted years later. In Sovremennik she starred as Olivia (Twelfth Night), Ranevskaya (The Cherry Orchard) and Valentina (Mikhail Roshchin's Valentin and Valentina).

In 1980 Vertinskaya left Sovremennik for the Moscow Art Theater. "It was only here that I acquired the level of professionalism I was craving for," she said in an interview years later. At MAT Vertinskaya mastered two roles from Anton Chekhov's repertoire, traditionally regarded as difficult: Nina Zarechnaya (The Seagull) and Yelena Andreyevna (Uncle Vanya). Critics praised Vertinskaya's performances, "emotionally charged, yet perfectly controlled." Among her other triumphs of the time were Elmire in Molière's Tartuffe directed by Anatoly Efros, Liza Protasova (Lev Tolstoy's Living Corpse), Natasha (Alone with Everybody by Alexander Gelman), and Pat (Mother-of-Pearl Zinaida by Mikhail Roshchin). In 1989 Vertinskaya portrayed her own father in The Mirage or the Russian Pierrot's Way, a show that she herself wrote a script for and directed to mark the centennial birthday anniversary of Alexander Vertinsky.

Vertinskaya excelled in her Shakespearean roles. First, in a theatrical experiment staged by director Anatoly Efros at Taganka Theatre, she played both Prospero and Ariel in Shakespeare's The Tempest, premiered at the Moscow Pushkin Museum. Highly original was her Olivia in Peter James's Sheffield Theatre production of Twelfth Night (1975), better known to Russian audiences for its televised version, which premiered in 1978. This role, in which Vertinskaya was allowed to demonstrate her comic talent for the first time, remains one of her personal favourites.

I totally adored this production. Sovremennik was the theatre I always experimented in. This role was no exception. I stripped my skin of all colour and made a Renaissance kind of browless face, with colourless lashes. The freedom the English director Peter Brook gave us was unbelievable. He liked to show us 'how' – running about on stage, arms out, belly forward, long hair flowing – very funny and charming. To play comedy is always a pleasure, but here everybody was totally involved with what was going on, and what a troupe it was: Marina Neyolova, Oleg Tabakov, Yuri Bogatyryov, Kostya Raikin, Pyotr Shcherbakov, Nina Doroshina... With such stunning partners what you get is a fabulous atmosphere.
A. Vertinskaya. Izvestia, 2009.

The actress (according to the magazine 7 Days) portrayed her heroine "not as a sultry beauty but as a Grace, infinitely charming and funny, full of boredom-related whims and flashes of sincerity, the product of her lively, inquisitive mind." Among the grand men of the Soviet theatre who praised Vertinskaya's unusual versatility was Anatoly Efros who once said the actress was "so physically natural and yet artistically graceful" that it was "almost unbelievable."

==== 1970s – 1980s: Vertinskaya in film ====
The success hasn't made life in the theatre any easier for Vertinskaya. She remembered how in Sovremennik (after Ophelia made her known internationally) she was shifted back to the mass scenes. Yevgeny Yevstigneev complained bitterly because the moment he (as the King in The Naked King) stepped on stage the audience responded in a hushed collective whisper: "Look over there, it's Vertinskaya in the crowd!" Occasionally, Vertinskaya remembered, she had to artificially "simplify" her facial features (even to stuff her nostrils) so as to fit the Soviet "common heroine" stereotype. "In those times, they demanded a different kind of heroine: ruddy-faced cheerful 'activistkas'", – the actress responded when asked about huge gaps in her working schedule in the early 1970s.

In 1978 the film Nameless Star (an adaptation of Mihail Sebastian's play) premiered on Soviet TV. The film's director (and also a well-known actor) Mikhail Kozakov gave Vertinskaya (with whom he was having a passionate love affair at the time) total freedom of improvisation, letting the two – Mona the character and Anastasiya the performer – almost merge. The film (where her partner was Igor Kostolevsky) remained one of Vertinskaya's all time favorites. The officials, however, disliked it.

The Soviet Central TV chief editor Khesin was freaked out. He summoned us all up and with me had a dialogue which I found most peculiar: "Anastasiichka, how could you? Look how nice you look in reality. So smiley, so good-looking. Why do you have to have those curls in the film? And wear such a dress?" Me: "Listen, what's wrong with those curls? My heroine is a 'kept woman'..." Him: "What do your say your heroine is?!.." And he shelved the film for years. – Anastasiya Vertinskaya.

Her next two films were The Gadfly (1980), based on Ethel Lilian Voynich's novel, where she played Jemma (her male counterpart, the then debutant, Andrey Kharitonov, later filmed her as a director) and The Theft, based on a play by Jack London, starring Innokenty Smoktunovsky.

As time went by, Vertinskaya was feeling more and more dissatisfied with what was going on around her – on stage and beyond. Twenty years later one critic called her a "symbol of the decades": "In the 60's she was a dream-girl, in the 70's – a style emblem, in the 80's – a movie idol." The feeling of frustration that was in the air, touched her as well. Vertinskaya's later work, including Margarita in The Master and Margarita (1994, directed by Yuri Kara and released only in 2011), another of her personal favourites, was made against the background of general decline in national cinema and culture in general.

=== Retirement ===
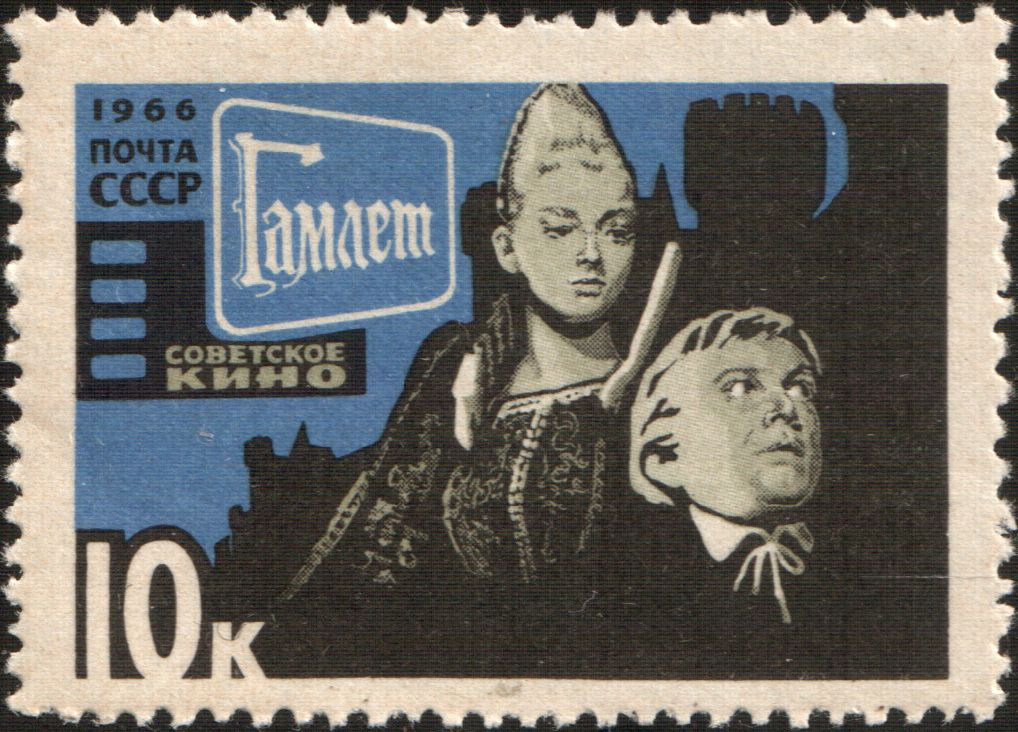
Vertinskaya and Smoktunovsky in Hamlet. 1966 Soviet postage stamp

In 1989 the invitation came from the Oxford University for Vertinskaya and Alexander Kalyagin to give master classes on theatrical craftsmanship. She spent the next 12 years teaching in England, France and Switzerland. "I realized that one had to reinvent oneself literally seven times during one's lifetime, otherwise one wouldn't be able to fully realize oneself. Why should I sit and moan about good roles eluding me? You need to learn to turn your back on the scene that doesn't suit you," she later explained in an interview, speaking also of how relieved she felt at having dropped this 'everlasting worry' about the need of being continuously in demand.

After Oxford Vertinskaya taught drama at the Comedie-Francaise (Théâtre de la République), at the Chekhov Theatre school, and at EFAS (European Film Actor School). Her play Chekhov, Act III, compiled of third acts from the Russian playwright's three classic plays ran successfully at the Théâtre Nanterre-Amandiers. Later she warmly remembered her European students' passionate love of the arts and their determination.

In 2000 Vertinskaya returned home. In 2002 she appeared in Imago, the stage production based upon M. Kurochkin's interpretation of George Bernard Shaw's Pygmalion directed by Nina Tchusova. In her 2009 Izvestiya interview Vertinskaya expressed regret about how little worthy roles were there to be found in the modern Russian theatre and said she'd rather stay away from the stage at all than start playing "hitmen's mums" (one such suggestion she had received). "I have no immediate plans concerning the stage and see no personal drama in it," she said.

Vertinskaya's two major concerns in the 21st century were the Russian Actors Foundation charity she founded in 1991, as well as restoring and producing her father's records; three of them came out in France. In 2010 Vertinskaya published a book of poetry she'd been working on for five years. She is also involved in her son Stepan Mikhalkov's restaurant business in Moscow.

== Critical reception ==
Vertinskaya's 1961 debut was successful with both cinema fans and critics, some of the latter hailing the fifteen-year-old a future star of the Soviet cinema. "No other Soviet actress could have played Assol. Her eyes, her profile, her thin arms... her flying gate – she was a real-life dream-girl," actress Natalya Seleznyova remembered. The young girl's slight clumsiness looked natural on screen, while her strengths – 'gracefulness', 'youthful charms' and an 'aura of other-worldliness' – went undisputed, according to critic L.Nekhoroshev. "It was as if a young flower blossomed before our eyes in the Soviet cinema," critic Andrei Plakhov recalled years later. Part of Vertinskaya's appeal was her unconventional good looks; the actress has been described variously as "the Soviet Vivien Leigh" and an "anti-Soviet-looking Soviet beauty."

Ophelia in Grigory Kozintsev's Hamlet marked a turning point in Vertinskaya's career. Some critics praised the way the director has managed to turn the young drama student's lack of self-confidence into an artistic statement, others were less impressed. According to Nekhoroshev, "cast into the set of directorial ideas, as if they were the iron corset of her Elizabethan dress, the young actress couldn't breathe freely in the atmosphere of high art she'd been submerged in." He had to agree, though, that "hidden within this rather mechanical Ophelia, certain inner logic and harmony have glimpsed through." E. Dobin regarded Vertinskaya's performance an artistic achievement. "This fresh ingénue's natural helplessness was used by the director as a distinctive feature of Ophelia's meek, vulnerable character... There wasn't a single vague or erratic note in young Vertinskaya's performance. Ophelia's image is crystal clear, as indeed is the actress's work, its deep transparency reminding one of a river, the bottom of which this heroine is destined for," he wrote. "Vertinskaya's Ophelia is probably one of the best in the history of theater and film. This role is extremely difficult for being seemingly unsubstantial next to those of Hamlet and other grandiose figures. Vertinskaya succeeded perfectly in making it fit in," Andrey Plakhov wrote.

Praised initially for her teenage charms, Vertinskaya soon evolved into a versatile and original actress. Her next, miniature but significant role, that of Princess Bolkonskaya in Sergey Bondarchuk's epic War and Peace garnered even more accolades. Critics noted a rare virtuosity with which "such a tragically fleeting, intrinsically unfulfilled character [had been made] strikingly vivid" and, even more extraordinary, continuously developing in the course of just four short scenes. "In Princess Liza there is a lot of inner dynamics and total integrity," according to the Actors of Soviet Cinema (1967) almanac.

Vertinskaya's work in Sovremennik (The Cherry Orchard, Valentin and Valentina) made critics speak of the "unique gracefulness" and the "technical virtuosity combined with deep psychological insight." Critically acclaimed were her performances in The Seagull (Nina) and Uncle Vanya (Elena). In Tartuffe, she elevated her Elmyra "onto on an enormous aesthetic pedestal, presenting her as a kind of noblewoman of old French canvasses, inapproachable in her beauty and grace," according to the Theatre magazine. The same critic marveled at her ability to create "beauty devoid of frustration; gracefulness without flaw, based on emotional fullness and self-enjoyment." In Shakespeare's The Tempest (produced by Anatoly Efros at Taganka) the actress demonstrated "the harmony of gesture, sound and movement," according to Krugosvet. The progress Vertinskaya made "from the charming but one-dimensional Assol-Ophelia" to the versatile multi-faceted master of many genres, was enormous, argued the critic Tatyana Moskvina. The fact that, unwilling to join the Soviet cinema's mainstream, she preferred to remain an enigmatic, out of the spotlight persona, added to her charisma. Later Vertinskaya solidified her reputation as "the nation's most secretive movie treasure," avoiding journalists and making her private life the subject of rumours and insinuations.

One of Vertinskaya's most notable roles in the 1970s was Countess Olyvia in The Twelfth Night, produced in Sovremennik by Peter Brook. Buoyed by the English director's democratic, improvisational approach and the energy of the star-studded cast, Vertinskaya fully realized her potential as a comedy actress. Konstantin Raikin thought Vertinskaya here was just playing herself. "She herself is very funny, ironic and naughty, so for once her own personality fitted into a role perfectly," he said. Vertinskaya as Mona in Mikhail Kozakov's Nameless Star was praised as quite natural and organic. The film had problems with the Soviet censorship but later was rated No.64 on Roskino's list of The Best Russian Films of All Time.

In The Master and Margarita (1994) the actress revealed hitherto unknown side of her artistic credo. According to V.Plotnikov, for years Vertinskaya has been "a victim of her background: everybody saw her as a 'little countess' or 'a little princess', while she herself often referred to herself as a natural-born witch." Tatyana Moskvina agreed that "infernal shadows of Bulgakov's novel" perfectly suited Vertinskaya, a "natural-born Margarita," neither "good nor evil, just totally otherworldly." This "hidden fire" of Bulgakov's heroine "has been burning in all of Vertinskaya's characters one way or another," the critic opined.

=== Recognition ===
In 1981, Anastasiya Vertinskaya was designated the People's Artist of the RSFSR. She received the Order of Honour in 2005 and the Order of Friendship in 2010. On 19 December 2009, her 65th birthday, both President Dmitry Medvedev and then Prime Minister Vladimir Putin sent her personal telegrams, speaking of her "bright individuality", never waning popularity and "unique roles, extraordinarily powerful and deep."

== Family and private life ==
In 1967 Vertinskaya married Nikita Mikhalkov, now a renowned Russian film director and actor, then a fellow student at the Boris Shchukin Theatre Institute. Half a year after their son Stepan was born. The marriage lasted three years. Later Vertinskaya was romantically involved with actor Mikhail Kozakov, then had a three-year-long relationship with Russian rock singer-songwriter Alexander Gradsky. She is a godmother to Anna, Artem, and Nadia, Nikita's children from his second wife.

== Filmography ==
- Scarlet Sails (Алые паруса, 1961) – Assol (leading role)
- Amphibian Man (Человек-амфибия, 1962) – Guttieres
- Hamlet (Гамлет, 1964) – Ophelia
- War and Peace (Война и мир, 1966–67) – Princess Bolkonskaya
- Anna Karenina, (Анна Каренина, 1968) – Kittie Scherbatskaya
- Don't Grieve (Не горюй!, 1969) – Mary Tzintsadze
- Enamoureds (Влюбленные, 1969) – Tanya
- The Polynin Case (Случай с Полыниным, 1970) – actress Galina Prokofyeva (leading role)
- A Shadow (Тень, 1972) – Princess Louise
- The Preliminary Man (Преждевременный человек, 1972) – Olga Borisovna (leading role)
- A Man at His Place (Человек на своем месте, 1972) – Clara, architect
- Domby and Son (Домби и сын, 1974 TV play) – Edyth Granger
- Nameless Star (Безымянная звезда, 1978) – Mona (leading role)
- The Twelfth Night (Двенадцатая ночь, 1979 TV play) – Olyvia
- The Gadfly (Овод, 1980) – Gemma
- Theft (Кража, 1982) – Margaret Chalmers
- Days and Years of Nikolai Batygin (Дни и годы Николая Батыгина, 1987) – Liza Paltseva
- The Lives of Don Quixotes and Sancho (Житие Дон Кихота и Санчо, 1988) – Duchess
- New Adventures of a Yankee in King Arthur's Court (Новые приключения янки при дворе короля Артура, 1988) – Queen Morgana
- The Tempest (Буря, 1988 TV play) – Prospero/Ariel
- How Dark the Nights Are on the Black Sea (В городе Сочи темные ночи, 1989) – Dunya
- Tartuffe (Тартюф, TV play, 1989) – Elmyra
- Thirst of Passion (Жажда страсти, 1991) – (anonymous, leading role)
- Master and Margarita (Мастер и Маргарита, 1994) – Margarita (leading role)
- Town Musicians of Bremen (Бременские музыканты, 2000) – Atamansha
- Casus Belli (Казус Белли, 2002)

== Recognition and awards ==
- 11 August 1980 - honorary title "Honored Artist of the RSFSR" - for merits in the field of Soviet cinema
- 17 March 1988 - honorary title "People's Artist of the RSFSR" - for merits in the field of Soviet theatrical art.
- 7 April 2005 - Order of Honor - for merits in the field of culture and art, many years of fruitful activity
- 5 November 2020 - Order of Alexander Nevsky - for a great contribution to the development of national culture and art, many years of fruitful activity.

"A bright personality, great work and dramatic talent have allowed you to achieve serious success in the acting profession. You revealed your creative potential on the stages of the country's leading theaters - in a variety of genres and roles. And such films as Scarlet Sails, Amphibian Man, Hamlet and others are popular among viewers of several generations," President D. A. Medvedev's congratulatory telegram dated 19 December 2009 said. "A talented actress endowed with a bright creative personality, both in the cinema and on the theater stage, you have created a whole gallery of unique images, each of which is filled with amazing strength and depth," V. V. Putin said in a telegram.
