= Scarlet Sails (band) =

American indie rock band

- Origin: New York City
- Genres: Rock; alternative rock; Indie Rock; Rock Noir
- Years active: 2015–present
- Members: Olya Fomina; Mark Christopher Kohut; Kevin Jones
- Website: scarletsailsband.com

Scarlet Sails is an indie rock band from New York City, formed in 2015 by founding members Olya Fomina (lead vocals, guitar, piano, ukulele) and Brian Viglione (drums, backing vocals, bass, guitar).

The band’s name comes from the 1923 romantic novel by Russian author Alexander Grin, a story about dreams coming true, no matter how silly, futile, or far-fetched they may seem. The young heroes in the story, Assol and Gray, are described as dreamers, misunderstood by those around them. Gray, a wealthy heir, wants to become a captain and runs away from home to fulfill his dream, eventually meeting Assol, who as a child, encounters an old man who claims to be a wizard and promises the girl that one day a prince will come on a ship with scarlet sails to carry her away. The villagers scoff, but Assol believes her dream will come true one day. As a child, this story was among Olya’s favorites.

== History ==
When singer Olya, a classical music school trained pianist, was 21, she left her home country of Russia to move to New York City. She met Brian Viglione at Bowery Electric in June 2013 at a Black Flag tribute show. At the time of their meeting, Brian had recently joined the American folk punk band Violent Femmes. In March 2014, the two were married in New York City. In the interim, he collaborated with Olya, recording their first EP as Scarlet Sails in late 2015. In December 2015, Brian left Violent Femmes to dedicate his time to Scarlet Sails. Their self-titled EP, produced by Martin Bisi, was released January 15, 2016.

In the summer of 2016, they embarked on their first US tour with Nina Diaz of Girl in a Coma, starting in Boston.

They recorded their debut album, Future From The Past, in December 2016, and after a successful Kickstarter campaign, it was released on April 10, 2017.

Throughout 2018, they plan to release a series of singles produced by Ben Rice.

== Musical style and influences ==
Their style is most often described as "lyrical and intense," and often "theatrical,” “noir-pop,” and “genre-bending.” They have been described by Impose Magazine as managing to “tie in a wealth of tracks divided by several genres to create a succinct and strangely beautiful whole.”

They have cited artists and bands such as David Bowie, Oasis, Radiohead, and Nina Simone among their musical influences.

== Members ==
- Olya Fomina - Vocals, Piano, Keyboards, Ukulele, Guitar
- Mark Christopher Kohut - Guitar
- Kevin Jones - Bass Guitar

== Discography ==
=== Studio albums ===
| Year | Album Information |
|---|---|
| 2017 | Future From The Past: Released: April 10, 2017; Format: CD, Digital download, LP |

=== Extended plays ===
| Year | Album Information |
|---|---|
| 2016 | Scarlet Sails: Released: January 15, 2016; Format: CD, Digital download |

=== Singles ===
| Year | Title | Album |
|---|---|---|
| 2016 | "I'll Be There" | Scarlet Sails EP |
| 2016 | "Wonder Why" | Non-album single |
| 2017 | "Boy You're Wrong" | Future From The Past |
| 2017 | "Spell My Name" | Future From The Past |
| 2017 | "Butterfly" | Future From The Past |
| 2018 | "Hideaway" | Non-album single |
| 2018 | "Upside Down" | Non-album single |
| 2020 | "It's Alright" | Non-album single |
