= The Fortress (1994 film) =

Pevnost
- Directed by: Drahomíra Vihanová
- Written by: Alexandr Kliment, Drahomíra Vihanová
- Release date: 1994
- Country: Czech Republic

Pevnost (The Fortress) is a 1994 Czech film directed by Drahomíra Vihanová. It was the director's second film 20 years after her first was banned just before release, and she was relegated to documentaries. The film starred Josef Kemr.

== Cast ==
- Antonín Brtoun
- György Cserhalmi as Ewald
- Miroslav Donutil as Dustojník
- Ivana Hloužková
- Karel Hofman as Fízl
- Irena Hrubá as Alena
- Vítězslav Jirsák as Vysetrovátel
- Josef Kemr as Petrasek
- Jiří Klepl
- Zuzana Kocúriková as Lydie
- Vladimír Marek as Hostinský
- Ilja Prachař as Funktionár
- Milan Rybák
- Jan Schmid as úredník
- Pavel Soukup
