= Grinlandia =

Fantasy world in the works of Alexander Grin

Grinlandia (Russian: Гринландия) is the fantasy world where most of the romantic novels and short stories of Alexander Grin take place. The name of the country is never mentioned by the author himself, and the name Grinlandia was suggested in 1934 by literary critic Korneliy Zelinsky and adopted by Grin's fans since then.

The Alexander Grin museum in Feodosia contains the reconstructed map of the land.

It is a land by the ocean, apparently far from Europe (as some characters speak about "sailing to Europe") but populated by people with vaguely Western European names and appearance. The language spoken in Grinlandia is also never identified (though the novels themselves are written in Russian).

There are several cities (Liss, Zurbagan, San Riole / San Riol (Сан-Риоль), etc.) repeatedly mentioned in the novels and stories, but none of them are identified as a capital.
