= Scarlet Sails (tradition) =

Celebration in St. Petersburg, Russia

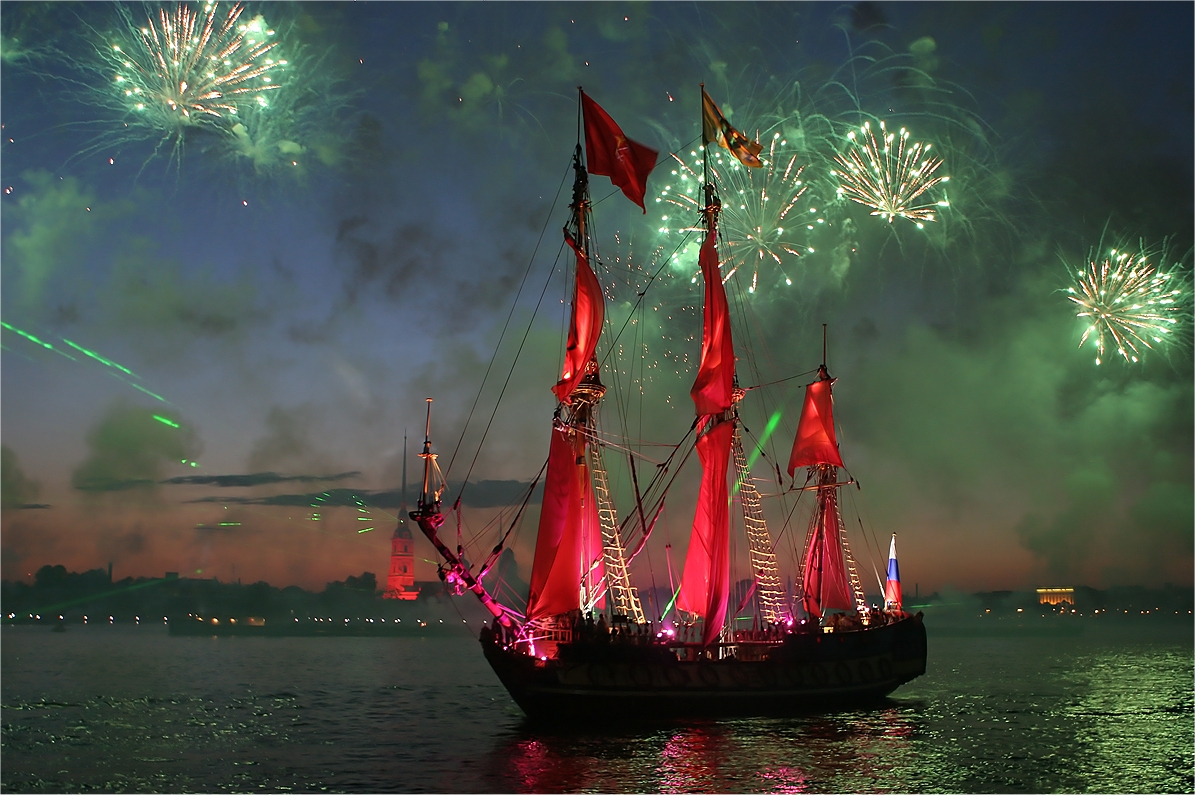
Fireworks displays during the show feature a ship (the frigate Shtandart) with red sails

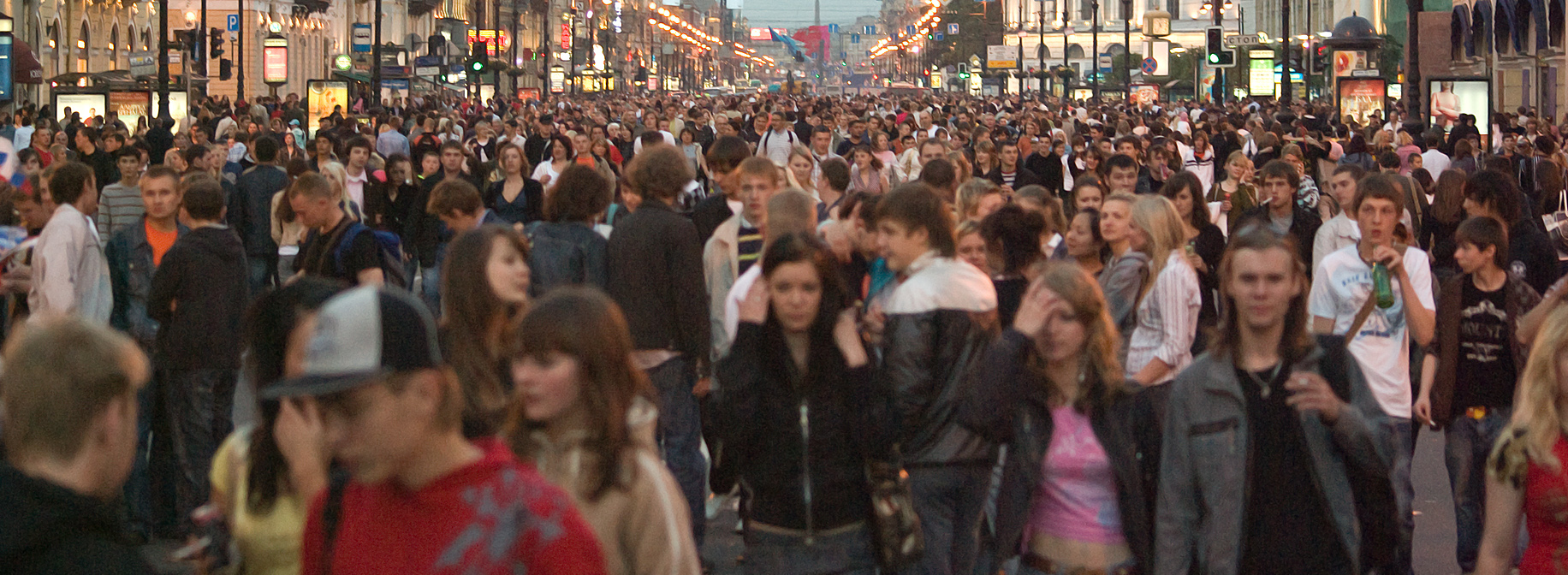
Crowd at Nevsky Prospect, gathering for the show (2008)

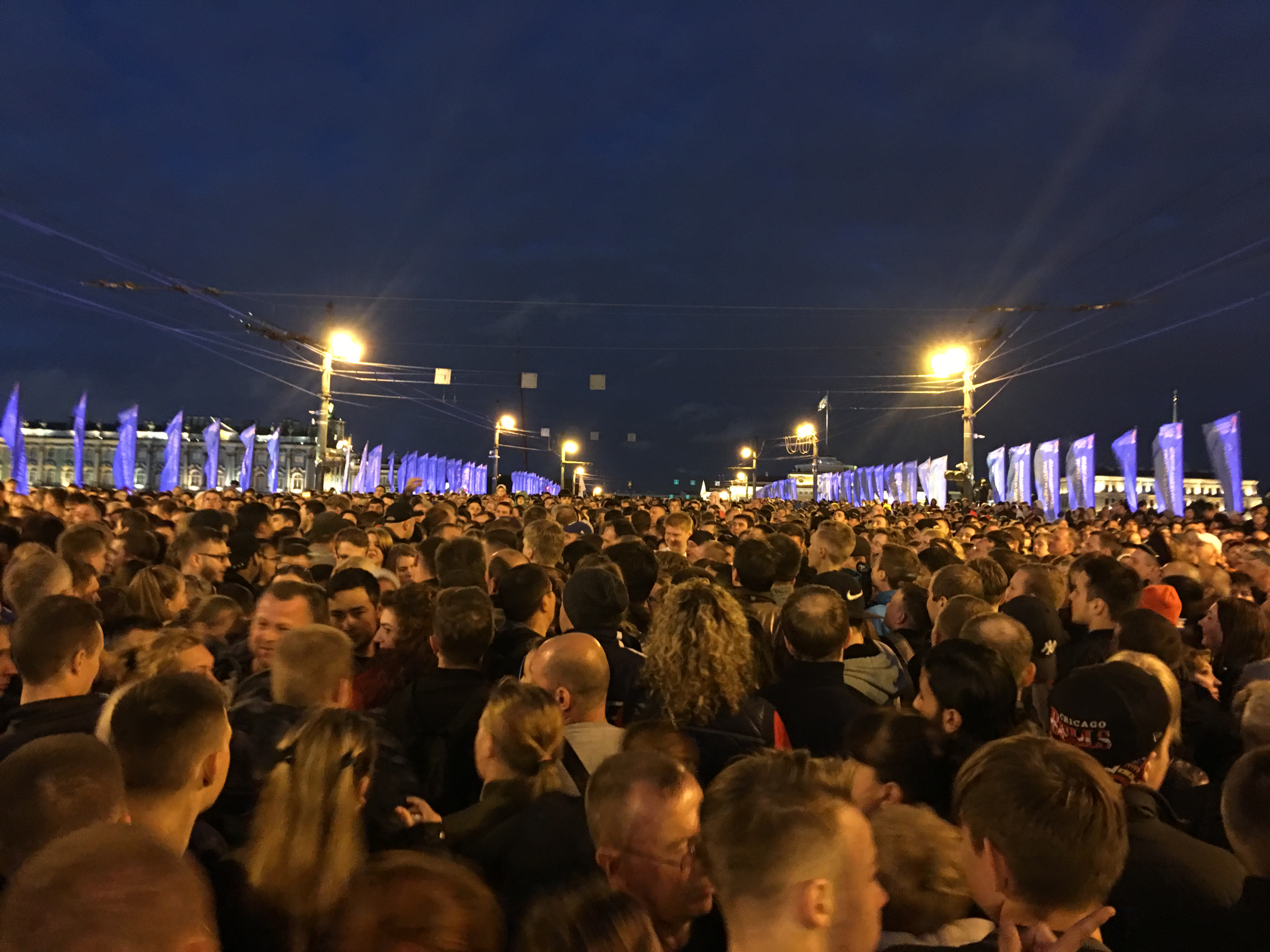
Bridge traffic after the celebration, which ends at 1:00 in the morning

The Scarlet Sails (Russian: Алые паруса) is a celebration in St. Petersburg, Russia, the most massive public event during the White Nights Festival every summer.

== Description ==
Entertainment includes appearances by popular rock-stars, as well as the St. Petersburg Symphony Orchestra, ballet and other classical acts, performing on several stages simultaneously during the event. The show also includes a series of large-scale events on the waters of the Neva River, such as rowing and motorboat races and a massive battle with pirates culminating in the appearance of a tall ship sporting spectacular scarlet sails.

== History ==
This tradition began in 1968, when several Leningrad schools united to celebrate at the end of the school year in connection with the symbolism of the popular 1923 romantic novel Scarlet Sails by Alexander Grin. During the first celebration, a brigantine with scarlet sails sailed along the English Embankment and the Admiralty Embankment towards the Winter Palace. The 1961 release of the film Scarlet Sails boosted the popularity both of the book and of the tradition.

The show has become the main part of the annual White Nights Festival celebration.

In 2010, public attendance grew to 3 million, with entertainers including such stars as the Cirque du Soleil, Mariinsky Ballet and Antonio Banderas.

2020-21 saw virtual celebrations in view of the COVID-19 pandemic. This celebration has returned since 2022.
