= Zuzana Kocúriková =

Slovak actress (born 1948)

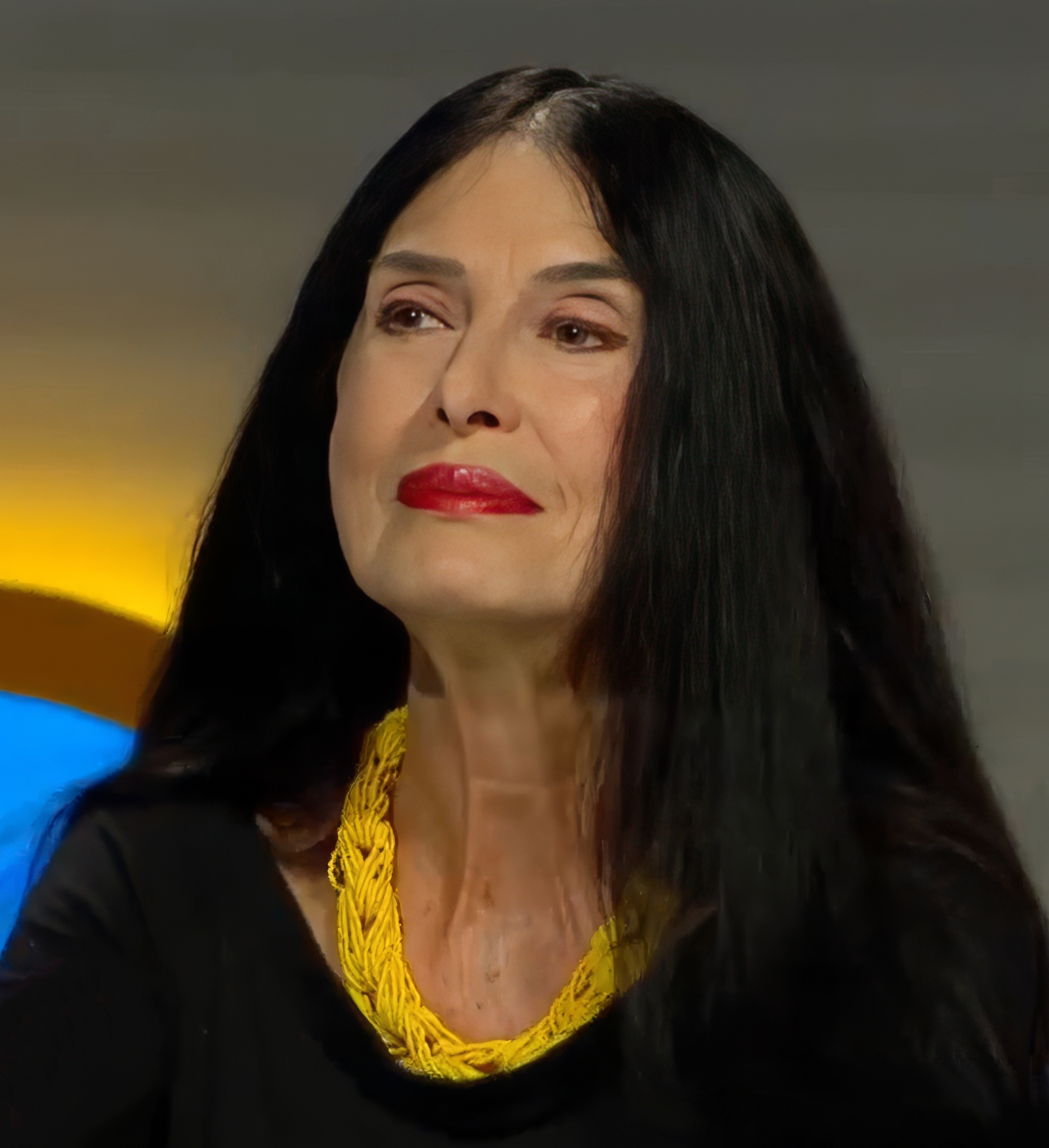
- Kocúriková in 2020
- Born: 19 December 1948 (age 77); Bratislava, Czechoslovakia
- Education: Academy of Performing Arts in Bratislava
- Occupation: Actress
- Years active: 1967–present
- Spouse: Peter Mikulík
- Children: 1

Zuzana Kocúriková (born 19 December 1948) is a Slovak actress. She is known for her youthful appearance and long raven hair.

== Career ==
Kocúriková made her film debut in the 1967 Jozef Zachar film A Pact with the Devil. She also featured in the 1968 film The Man Who Lies alongside Jean-Louis Trintignant. She played a leading role in the 1969 Czech film The Lanfier Colony. Kocúriková graduated from the Academy of Performing Arts in Bratislava in 1971 and then joined the drama company of the Slovak National Theatre. She has acted in plays including August: Osage County and The Memory of Water.

During the 1970s, Kocúriková appeared in films including A Star Is Falling Upwards (1974), Paleta lásky (1976) and Beauty and the Beast (1978). In the 1970s she was also a cast member of the Czechoslovak television series Miesto v dome.

In the 1980s and 1990s, she continued acting. As well as playing a part in the 1982 Slovak fairytale The Salt Prince, she also had a role in the 1994 film The Fortress. Her television series towards the end of the century included Povstalecká história (1984) and Štúrovci (1991).

After the turn of the century, Kocúriková continued to act; her later films including roles in The Velvet Murderers (2005), Heaven, Hell ... Earth (2009). She also continued to feature in television series such as Ordinácia v ružovej záhrade (2007), Panelák (2008), Organised Crime Unit (2009), Horúca krv (2012) and Semafor (2018). On stage, she starred alongside Marián Labuda in the Slovak National Theatre production of Václav Havel's play Leaving, which premiered in 2008.

== Awards ==
Kocúriková was won various awards in Slovakia including Cena Literárneho fondu in 2014, and the Osobnosť Bratislavy award in 2017. She was inducted into the Slovak Television and Radio Hall of Fame in 2025.

== Personal life ==
Kocúriková was married to theatre director Peter Mikulík until his death in 2025. Together they have one child, a daughter called Katarína. She is known for having a large collection of hats.
