= Future from the Past =

Future From The Past

Studio album by Scarlet Sails
- Released: April 10, 2017
- Recorded: 2016
- Studio: Atlantic Sound Studio
- Genre: Rock; alternative rock; indie rock; rock noir
- Length: 51:02

Scarlet Sails chronology
| Scarlet Sails (2016) | Future From The Past (2017) |

Singles from Future From The Past
- 1. "Boy You're Wrong" Released: 2017; 2. "Spell My Name" Released: 2017; 3. "Butterfly" Released: 2017

Future From The Past is the first studio album by indie rock band Scarlet Sails, released in April 2017. The album was recorded in late 2016.

The album was released after a successful Kickstarter campaign, funded by nearly 200% in March 2017. The songs were all written by singer Olya Fomina throughout the course of her living in New York City, having moved there from Moscow, Russia in 2011. When explaining the meaning behind the album title, Olya said that "all the songs symbolized different things and we wanted to put it all together. So future from the past is sort of like the best way to kind of sum it all up." As Brian explains it, "the future from the past is now. The present, the image that you project of yourself when you were a small kid or the dreams that you have. You arrive finally at that moment and you look back from what you can from those past experiences and you try to create what you can and manifest the things that you hope for and worked for in your present."

One of the incentives for the Kickstarter campaign was for their supporters to be in their music video for the song "Spell My Name", which was released on August 1, 2017.

Explaining the concept of the album, Brian stated that they wanted "the power and grandiosity of Queen, the dark and raw maniacal twist of Bob Ezrin-era Alice, and the spacious sonic pallet of Radiohead" all to come out in the recording.

== Track listing ==
All tracks are written by Olya Fomina.

| No. | Title | Length |
|---|---|---|
| 1. | "As I Am" | 5:04 |
| 2. | "Ready or Not" | 3:40 |
| 3. | "Boy You're Wrong" | 4:47 |
| 4. | "I Found a Boat" | 4:47 |
| 5. | "Precious Times" | 3:46 |
| 6. | "Spell My Name" | 4:14 |
| 7. | "One, Two (FEAR)" | 4:04 |
| 8. | "Everytime" | 3:13 |
| 9. | "Alive" | 4:07 |
| 10. | "Butterfly" | 4:09 |
| 11. | "Another Chance" | 3:17 |
| 12. | "Out of Tune" | 5:54 |

== Personnel ==
- Olya Fomina – vocals, piano, keyboards
- Brian Viglione – drums, percussion, vocals, bass guitar, acoustic guitar
- Mark Christopher Kohut – electric guitar
- Jesse Krakow – bass guitar
- Brian Viglione – producer
- Nic Hard – mixer
- Diko Shoturma, Daniel Pasquel, and Matthias Anton – engineering
- Greg Calbi – mastering
