= The Lanfier Colony =

1969 film

- Film poster
- Directed by: Jan Schmidt
- Written by: Alexander Grin; Jan Schmidt
- Starring: Juozas Budraitis; Zuzana Kocúriková; Václav Neckář; Michal Dočolomanský
- Cinematography: Jiří Macháně
- Release date: 11 August 1969
- Running time: 84 minutes
- Countries: Czechoslovakia; Soviet Union
- Languages: Czech; Russian

The Lanfier Colony (Czech: Kolonie Lanfieri, Russian: Колония Ланфиер) is a 1969 Czech-Soviet action, romantic, drama film directed by Jan Schmidt. It was entered into the 6th Moscow International Film Festival.

== Plot ==
Tired of life on the continent, Horn convinces the captain of a Dutch sailing ship to land it on the shore of distant island.

Residents of the small village greet the newly arrived colonist with a barely concealed distaste, but he is in no hurry to make new friends and makes his home far away from people.

Horn is dreaming about solitude, because in his previous life behind him he left only disappointment; unrequited love, and failed attempts to make money on the tea trade.

Of all the inhabitants of the islands Horn befriends only two, poor lonely wretches just like him; feeble-minded Bekeko and beautiful Esther who is forced to prepare for a wedding with a man she does not love.

Horn finds a gold deposit located near a river. Now he wants only one thing – to collect as much precious metal as possible, return to the mainland and try to start over. Horn separates itself from Bekeko and refuses Esther's offer to live together.

Horn's discourse with the younger Dribb, Esther's fiancé is followed by a quarrel and exchanged gunshots. Wounded Dribb rides out for help, and soon Horn is forced to face the well-armed squad of people who hate him.

== Cast ==
- Juozas Budraitis as Horn
- Zuzana Kocúriková as Ester
- Václav Neckář as Fool Bekeko
- Michal Dočolomanský as Young Dribb
- Josef Elsner as Old Dribb
- Bolot Beyshenaliyev as Goupi - swineherd
- Beta Ponicanova as Saba
- Bohumil Vávra as Astis - Ester's father
- Andrei Fajt as Lanfieri
