= Drahomíra Vihanová =

Czech film director, documentarian, and screenwriter

- Born: 31 July 1930; Moravský Krumlov, Czechoslovakia
- Died: 10 December 2017 (aged 87); Prague, Czech Republic
- Occupations: Film director Screenwriter

Drahomíra Vihanová (31 July 1930 – 10 December 2017) was a Czech film director, documentarian, and screenwriter.

== Life ==
Vihanová was born in Moravský Krumlov. Her debut work was a 1965 short film named Fugue on the Black Keys. Her 1969 debut feature film Squandered Sunday was banned before release, and Vihanová was restricted to work on documentaries and television until the transition to democracy in 1989.

Vihanová died after a short illness at the age of 87.

== Filmography ==
- Singing that Did Not Die Out (1962)
- The Black Keys Fugue (1964)
- A Squandered Sunday (1969)
- Questions for Two Women (1985)
- Pevnost (1994)
- The Pilgrimage of Students Peter and Jacob (2000)
