= Scarlet Sails (film) =

Scarlet Sails Алые паруса
- Poster for original USSR release
- Directed by: Alexandr Ptushko
- Written by: Alexandr Yurovsky; Semyon Nagorny
- Starring: Anastasiya Vertinskaya; Vasily Lanovoy; Lena Cheremshanova; Sasha Lupenko; Ivan Pereverzev
- Cinematography: Gennady Tsekavy; Viktor Yakushev
- Edited by: I. Moronov
- Music by: Igor Morozov
- Distributed by: RUSCICO
- Release date: 1961
- Running time: 88 minutes
- Country: Soviet Union
- Language: Russian

Scarlet Sails (Russian: Алые паруса, romanized: Alye parusa) is a 1961 Soviet romantic fantasy film produced by Mosfilm and directed by Alexandr Ptushko. It is based on Alexander Grin's 1923 romance novel of the same name and stars Vasily Lanovoy and Anastasiya Vertinskaya. The story is a romantic fantasy and is described as a "fairy tale", though it contains no supernatural elements but two prophecies that came true.

== Plot ==
The setting is a small fishing village. The former seaman Longren raises his daughter Assol alone after losing his beloved wife, making a meager living by selling the toy boats he carves from wood. As a child, Assol encounters an old man who claims to be a wizard and promises the girl that one day a prince will come on a ship with scarlet sails to carry her away. The villagers scoff but Assol believes her dream will come true one day.

Arthur Grey is a nobleman's son who breaks away from his cruel father to pursue a life at sea, and eventually becomes the captain of a merchant vessel. Having set to port at Assol's village, he spies the young maiden sleeping in the forest and falls in love. After inquiring in the village he learns of Assol's dream and sets about to make it come true.

== Principal cast ==
Actor	Role
Anastasiya Vertinskaya	Assol
Vasily Lanovoy	Arthur Grey
Yelena Cheremshanova	Young Assol
Aleksandr Lupenko	Young Arthur
Ivan Pereverzev	Longren
Nikolay Volkov	Egl (the wizard)
Sergei Romodanov	Captain Gop
Oleg Anofriyev	Letika (a seaman)
Zoya Fyodorova	Governess
Pavel Massalsky	Arthur's father
Grigory Shpigel	Menners Jr. (the innkeeper)

== Miscellaneous ==
This was the film debut of Anastasiya Vertinskaya, who celebrated her 16th birthday during the filming. She went on to star in such Soviet classics as The Amphibian Man and Hamlet.

Locations used in the filming include Koktebel and Yalta in Crimea, Baku in Azerbaijan, and Pitsunda in Abkhazia.

Two real ships were used for Grey's ship Secret. One of them was the training ship Alfa («Альфа») from the Rostov-on-Don Naval School. It was outfitted with 2,500 meters of scarlet parachute silk procured to satisfy Ptushko's demand for authenticity. Another one was Tovarishch («Товарищ») from the port city of Kherson.

Vasiliy Lanovoy, who wanted to surprise his wife and other guests at the resort in Yalta where the movie was shot, asked the captain of the ship used for the movie to sail to Yalta with the scarlet sails. "The reaction [at the resort] was the same as in the movie, one of disbelief and amazement".

== See also ==
- Scarlet Sails (tradition) is an annual celebration in St. Petersburg rooted in Grin's novel
