= Alexander Grin =

Russian writer (1880–1932)

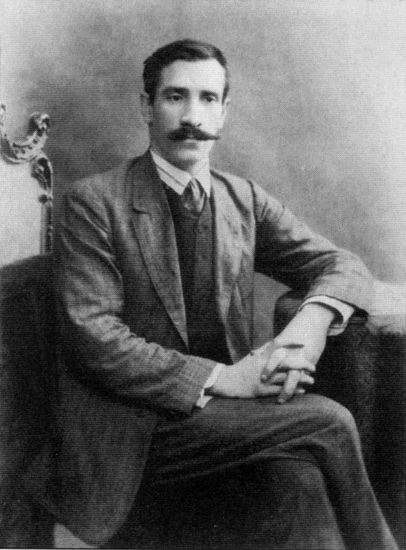
- Grin in 1910
- Born: Alexander Grinevsky; 23 August 1880; Vyatka, Russia
- Died: 8 July 1932 (aged 51); Stary Krym, Russian SFSR, Soviet Union
- Occupation: Writer
- Spouse(s): Vera Abramova; Nina Grin
- Writing career
- Language: Russian
- Period: 1906–1932
- Movement: Neo-romanticism

Aleksandr Stepanovich Grinevsky (Russian: Александр Степанович Грине́вский; 23 August [O.S. 11 August] 1880 – 8 July 1932), better known by his pen name Alexander Green or Grin (Note: spelling varies in non-Russian literature) (Russian: Александр Грин, romanized: Aleksandr Grin, IPA: [ɐlʲɪˈksandr ɡrʲin]), was a Russian writer, notable for his romantic novels and short stories, mostly set in an unnamed fantasy land with a European or Latin American flavor (Grin's fans often refer to this land as Grinlandia). Most of his writings deal with the sea, adventures, and love.

== Biography ==
Alexander Grin was born Aleksandr Stepanovich Grinevsky (Russian: Алекса́ндр Степа́нович Грине́вский) in Slobodskoy, Vyatka Governorate (now in Kirov Oblast) in 1880, the son of the Pole Stefan Hryniewski (pronounced in Russian as Stefan Grinevsky). Stefan was sent away to Tula as punishment after participating in the January Uprising of 1863, and of a Russian nurse, Anna Lyapkova. Aleksandr, after graduating from a school in Vyatka (in 1896), went to Odessa and lived the life of a vagabond. He worked as a sailor, gold miner, and construction worker, but often found himself without a job and sustained himself by begging and with money sent to him by his father.

After joining the Russian army, he became a member of the Socialist-Revolutionary Party, was arrested, and spent time in jail for "revolutionary propaganda". He published his first short story in a newspaper in 1906. In the same year he was arrested in Saint Petersburg and sentenced to four years of exile in a remote area of Tobolsk Governorate. However, very soon after arriving in Tobolsk, Grin escaped and returned to Petersburg to live illegally. He was again arrested in 1910 and sent to live in Arkhangelsk Governorate. In a small village called Kegostrov, Grin and his first wife Vera Pavlovna Abramova (whom he married in 1910) lived from 1910 to 1912.

In 1912 he returned to Saint Petersburg and divorced his wife. At that time, Grin published mostly short stories; most of his larger works were written after the 1917 October Revolution and enjoyed significant popularity in the first half of the 1920s. In 1921 he married Nina Nikolaevna Grin. In 1924 they moved to Feodosiya to live near the sea. In his late days, Grin's romantic visions contrasted starkly with mainstream Soviet literature; publishers in Moscow and Leningrad refused to consider his romantic writings, and Grin and his wife lived in extreme poverty. Grin suffered from alcoholism and tuberculosis, which eventually ruined his health. He died of stomach cancer in 1932 in Stary Krym and was interred in the Stary Krym cemetery.

In his book Sculpting in Time, filmmaker Andrei Tarkovsky describes how Grin, when dying of hunger, "went off into the mountains with a home-made bow-and-arrow to shoot some sort of game". He offers Grin as an example of a poet in the deepest sense: one with "an awareness of the world, a particular way of relating to reality... a philosophy to guide a man throughout his life".

== Works ==
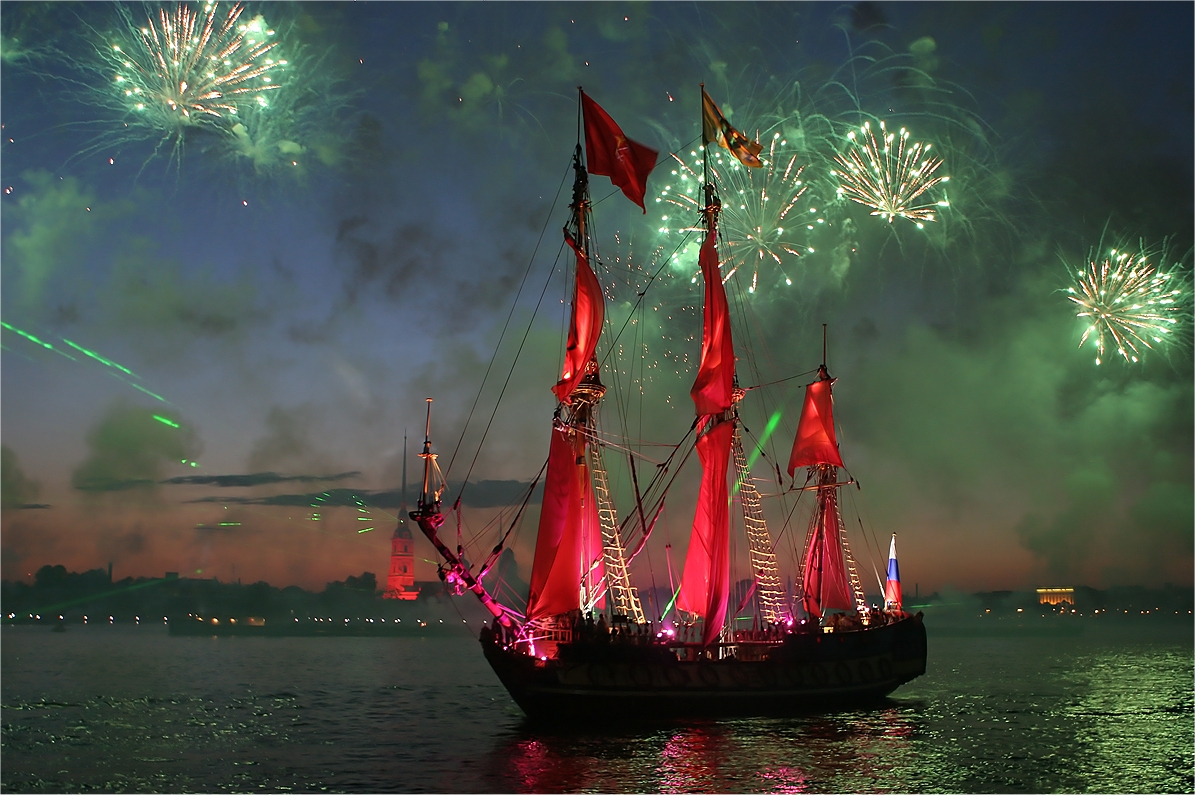
A ship with scarlet sails is a mascot for the "Scarlet Sails" celebrations in Saint Petersburg named after Alexander Grin's novel

Most of Alexander Grin's writings bear no direct relation to the reality of Imperial and Soviet Russia that he lived in. The setting of most of his novels and short stories is an unnamed land by the sea, apparently far from Europe but with all characters being Western European in name and appearance. Even his literary pseudonym (Grin) is a de-Russified form of his real last name (Grinevsky).

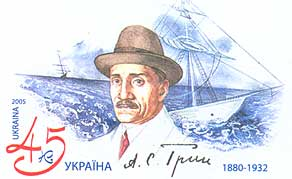
Stamp of Ukraine, 2005

Described by some critics as "adolescent fiction", Grin's works have many things in common with the reality of the early 20th century (such as automobiles and banks). Populated by sea captains, sailors, scientists, travelers, criminals, extravagant aristocrats, childlike girls, elegant villains, and strong-spirited heroes who always stay true to their dreams, Grin's world is often referred to as Grinlandia by fans. Some of his novels contain an element of magic – not as an established part of his world, but always as a miracle that changes the lives of those who encounter it.

== Bibliography ==
The most notable of his novels include:

- Scarlet Sails (Алые паруса, 1923), a simple but powerful love story, perhaps the most famous of Grin's works. It was made into a 1961 film, when during the Khrushchev Thaw, Grin's works enjoyed a revival of popularity.
- The Shining World (Блистающий мир, 1923)
- The Golden Chain (Золотая цепь, 1925)
- She Who Runs on the Waves (Бегущая по волнам, 1928)
- Jessie and Morgiana (1929, Wikisource: Джесси и Моргиана). It was made into a Czechoslovak film Morgiana in 1972.
- The Road to Nowhere (Дорога никуда, 1930)

== Books ==
- Selected Short Stories. Translated by Nicholas Luker. Ann Arbor, Mich.: Ardis Publishers, 1987.
- Fandango and Other Stories. Translated by Bryan Karetnyk. New York: Columbia University Press, 2020 (The Russian Library).

== Film adaptations ==
- Watercolor (1958), directed by Otar Iosseliani
- Scarlet Sails (1961), directed by Alexandr Ptushko
- The Lanfier Colony (1969), directed by Jan Schmidt
- Morgiana (1972), directed by Juraj Herz
- The Rat Savior (1976), directed by Krsto Papić
- The Shining World (1984), directed by Bulat Mansurov
- Mister Designer (1988), directed by Oleg Teptsov
- She Who Runs on the Waves (2007), directed by Valery Pendrakovskiy
- Scarlet (2022), directed by Pietro Marcello
