= Scarlet Sails (novel) =

Novel by Alexander Grin

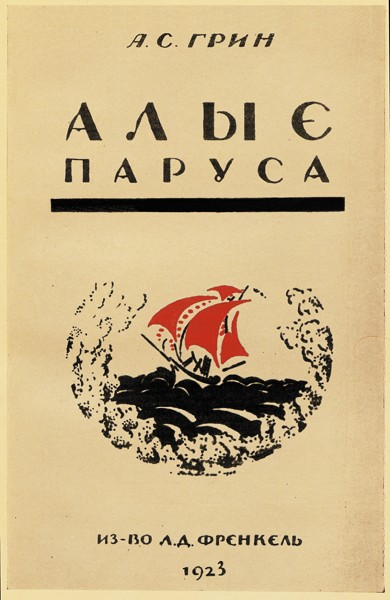
Алые паруса, the first (1923) edition

Scarlet Sails (Russian: Алые паруса, Alye parusa) is a 1923 romantic novel with elements of fantasy by Russian writer Alexander Grin. The author described the genre of the novel as féerie. It is a story about a dream coming true no matter how futile it seems. It was written from 1916–1922.

== Synopsis ==
The novel explores two plot lines: Assol's line and Gray's line. They that join in the finale.

Assol's plot line: The sailor Longren returns home to his village of Kaperna, and finds that his wife has died from illness and left him a 3-month-old daughter, Assol. Longren gives up his life as a sailor and spends his days raising Assol and making toys. After an incident where Longren leaves the man he considers responsible for his wife's death to drown, Longren and Assol are shunned by society. One day Assol is sent to a city with a batch of toys, including a yacht with scarlet sails. Assol lets it sail along a stream, and as she followed it she meets an elderly stranger, Egl, who prophesies that many years in the future a prince will carry her away on a ship with scarlet sails. Since then Assol has dreamt of this prophecy while the locals consider her insane.

Gray's plot line: Arthur Gray is a rich heir given to flights of fancy. When he is young, he is told that an ancestor of his left barrels of wine to his descendants claiming "Gray shall only drink this wine in paradise!" Inspired by a seascape painting, he runs away from home at age 15 and joins the crew of the schooner Anselm. Later, he becomes captain of his own ship, the Secret. When it sails to Kaperna, Gray sees a sleeping girl, falls in love with her and puts his ring on her finger. In the local tavern he is told (by the son of the man Longren left to die) that the girl is a local crazy named Assol and her dream of meeting her prince with a ship with scarlet sails, but a friend of Assol claims that she is not in fact insane. He makes sails of scarlet silk and sails to Assol's village.

Finale: Assol sees a white ship with scarlet sails, Gray takes Assol in a boat to the ship, and they drink the wine. Both prophecies are fulfilled.

== Commentary ==
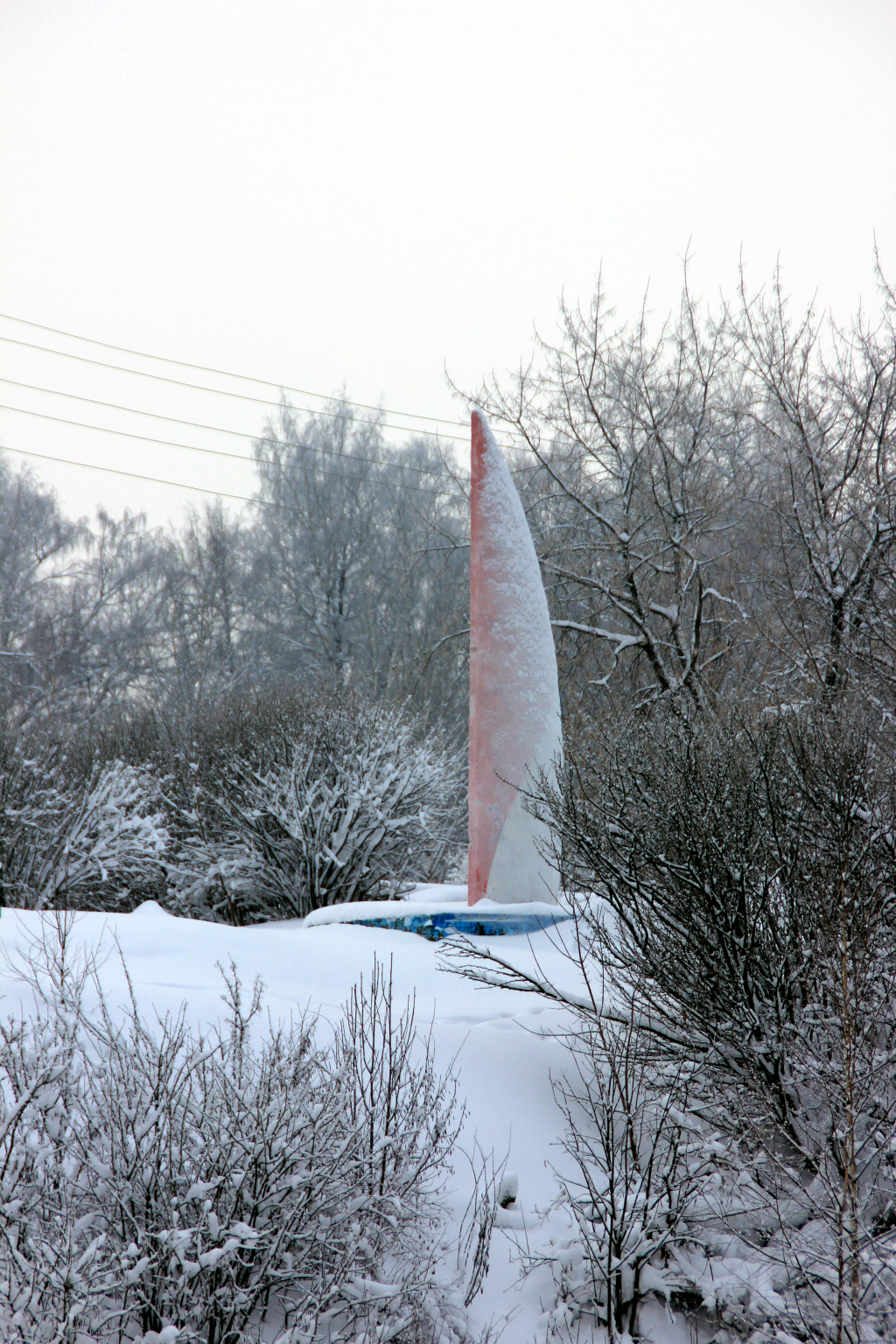
"Scarlet Sail", a monument at Slobodskoy, Grin's birthplace

The prophecy is the only fantastic element of the novel. The first version had a bit more: the "Scarlet Sails" was supposed to be a story within a story, with the frame story involving the narrator and the flying man Mas-Tuel.

Scarlet Sails had a tremendous impact on Russian culture.

== English translations ==
- Olga Godim's 2019 version

== Adaptations ==
=== Film ===
- Scarlet Sails (1961), directed by Alexandr Ptushko
- Scarlet (2022), directed by Pietro Marcello
- Assol, a 1982 feature-length film by Boris Stepantsev with elements of animation

=== Scene ===
- 2013: Scarlet Sails (musical)

=== Music ===
- Assol, a 1965 children's operetta by Eugen Kapp

== See also ==
- Scarlet Sails (tradition) - annual celebration in St. Petersburg rooted in Grin's novel
